= Tornado outbreak sequence of March 24–28, 2021 =

Outbreak of tornadoes and severe weather in the United States

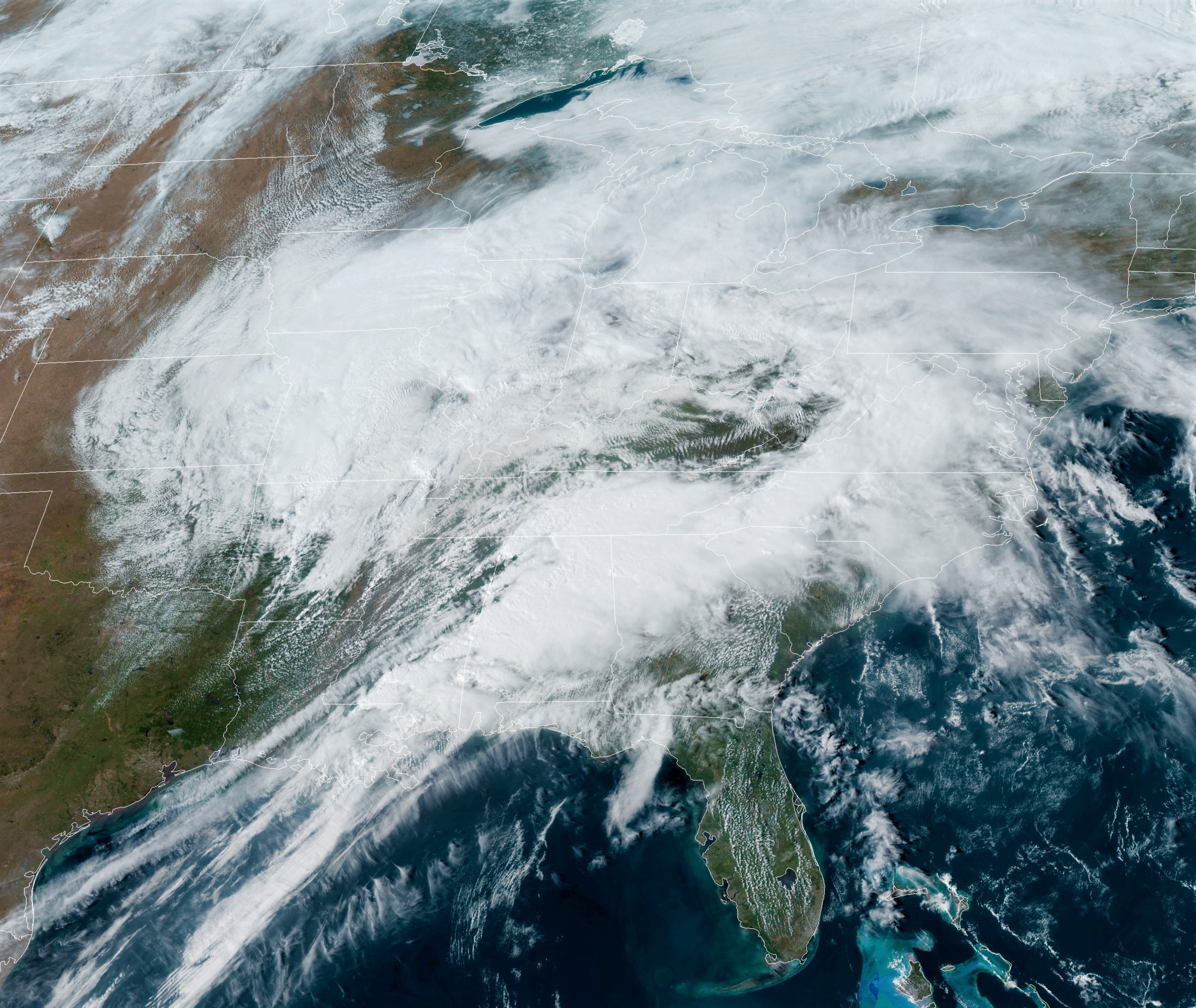
- Satellite imagery from GOES-16 at 20:36 UTC (4:36 pm EDT) March 25, 2021 of the extratropical cyclone responsible for the sequence's first and most significant tornado outbreak.

Meteorological history
- Duration: March 24–28, 2021

Tornado outbreak
- Tornadoes: 43
- Max. rating: EF4 tornado
- Highest winds: Tornadic – 170 mph (270 km/h) (Newnan, Georgia EF4 on March 26); Straight-line – 105 mph (169 km/h) (Cedartown, Georgia on March 25)
- Largest hail: 3.00 in (7.6 cm) (Lonoke, Arkansas on March 27)

Overall effects
- Fatalities: 7 (+8 non-tornadic, +1 indirect)
- Injuries: 37+
- Damage: $3.2 billion
- Areas affected: Southeastern and Northeastern United States
- Part of the tornado outbreaks of 2021

A significant tornado outbreak sequence took place from March 24–28, 2021 in the Southern United States, just one week after another outbreak affected similar regions. There were 43 tornadoes confirmed across 11 states, with the bulk of activity primarily on March 25, which resulted in the Storm Prediction Center (SPC) issuing its second high-risk outlook for the month of March, as well as the second high-risk outlook for 2021. Several intense tornadoes touched down on that day, including ones that prompted the issuance of rare tornado emergencies near Hoover, Alabama, Brent and Centreville, Alabama, and in the Newnan, Georgia area. March 27 also saw widespread tornado activity mainly across East Texas, Southern Arkansas, Louisiana, and Western Tennessee with several strong tornadoes touching down. Scattered to widespread wind and hail damage occurred throughout the outbreak sequence, and repeated rounds of heavy rain caused widespread severe flash and river flooding across much of Tennessee.

Six people were killed near Ohatchee, Alabama by a low-end EF3 tornado, an EF2 tornado killed one person near Carthage, Texas and a low-end EF4 tornado resulted in one indirect death in Newnan, Georgia. An elderly woman in Mississippi was also killed when a tree uprooted by soft soil and heavy rains fell onto her mobile home on March 24 while a man was killed in Carmel, Indiana when a tree was blown over onto him by damaging winds during a severe thunderstorm late on March 27. Severe flooding also killed seven people in Nashville. At least 37 other people were injured during the outbreak as well.

== Meteorological synopsis ==
=== March 24 ===
The first day of the severe weather outbreak, March 24, was not well forecast. A marginal risk outlook for severe weather was originally issued Eastern Texas into the Lower Mississippi Valley on March 22, highlighting the isolated possibility for all severe hazards. By the day of the event, a slight risk outlook had been issued across the Southern Plains and the ArkLaTex regions, mainly for the threat of large hail. By 2000 UTC, however, an enhanced risk outlook for large hail had been issued and extended from Central to Northeast Texas. Numerous supercells formed that afternoon, producing mainly large hail, although two EFU tornadoes were confirmed. To the east in Mississippi in the town of Centreville, an elderly woman was killed when a severe storm blew a tree onto her mobile home.

=== March 25–26 ===
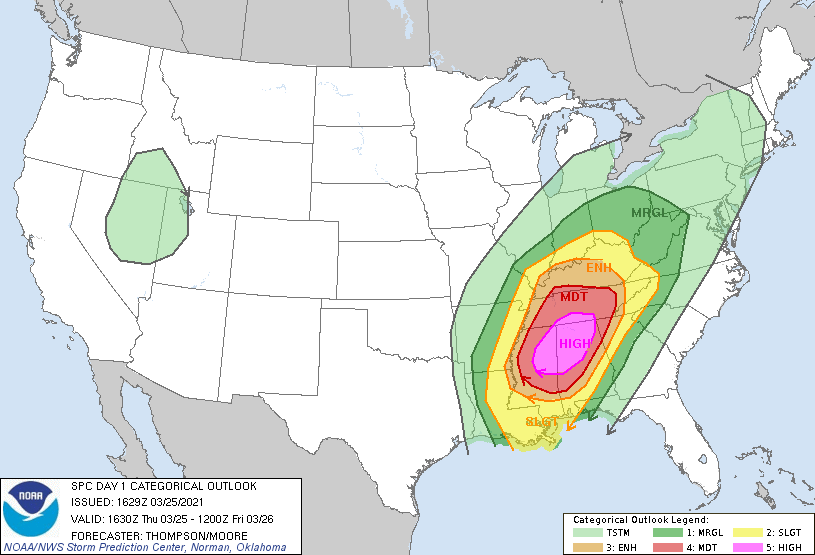
High risk convective outlook issued by the Storm Prediction center at 16:30 UTC on March 25

On March 22, the Storm Prediction Center issued a broad 15% risk contour from Eastern Texas to the Central Gulf Coast States, highlighting the potential for multiple rounds of severe storms to move through the region. The next day, a large enhanced risk area was issued over parts of the Lower Mississippi Valley and the Southeast, including most of Mississippi. On March 24, the risk was upgraded to moderate over Central and Northern Mississippi as well as Northwestern Alabama and large portion of Tennessee. On the morning of March 25, the moderate risk was upgraded to a high following the issuance of a 30% hatched risk area for tornadoes from central, eastern and northern Mississippi into northwestern Alabama and southern Tennessee. The high risk was later expanded to include all of northern Alabama southward to the central part of the state. At 16:25 UTC, a Particularly Dangerous Situation tornado watch was issued for western and northern Alabama, northwest Georgia, central and eastern Mississippi, and southern Middle Tennessee. Six more tornado watches would be issued through the rest of the day as well.

Tornado outbreak sequence of March 24–28, 2021

As the outbreak began, one supercell produced three destructive low-end EF3 tornadoes that were confirmed via radar as it moved across Central Alabama, with the second one prompting a tornado emergency in Shelby County, Alabama. The tornado also damaged the home of James Spann, who was covering the event live on ABC 33/40 at the time and saw the tornado on a traffic camera as it crossed over Oak Mountain. The third tornado produced by this supercell was the deadliest of the outbreak sequence, killing six people in Ohatchee. As the afternoon progressed, more tornadic supercells moved through Alabama, as well as Mississippi, Tennessee, Kentucky, Georgia, and South Carolina, producing numerous tornadoes. Another tornado emergency was issued later that afternoon for Brent and Centreville for a large EF3 tornado. Severe and tornadic activity continued into the overnight hours, with a third tornado emergency being issued shortly after midnight for Newnan and Peachtree City, Georgia due to a large, violent low-end EF4 tornado. Strong winds were felt throughout parts of the Northeastern and Midwestern United States, causing major power outages.

More isolated severe weather was expected over several regions of the country of March 26, including a slight risk area that was issued in portions of Upstate New York and Vermont, where a severe thunderstorm watch was issued. A narrow, but severe squall line pushed through this area in the early afternoon hours, producing consistent wind damage. An embedded circulation within the line also produced an isolated high-end EF1 tornado northeast of Middlebury, Vermont, injuring two people. Severe weather reports were also recorded in the Deep South and the Central Plains.

=== March 27–28 ===
A slight risk of severe thunderstorms was issued for March 27 from the Lower Mississippi through Tennessee Valleys on March 25 as another weather system was expected to enter the region. The next morning, a small enhanced risk was issued from the Memphis to the Western Nashville metropolitan areas due to a 10% risk contour for tornadoes. That afternoon, the area was hatched, indicating an increased likelihood for strong tornadoes. The enhanced area was expanded to cover a region from Southern Arkansas to Middle Tennessee on the morning of March 27 with the addition of 30% hatched contours for both wind damage and large hail. The southwestern portion of the enhanced risk was eventually pushed into the ArkLaTex region later that day. Slight and marginal risk areas also covered areas from Eastern Texas and Illinois to North Carolina. Numerous strong to severe thunderstorms formed that afternoon, producing widespread reports of hail and wind damage. There were 19 confirmed tornadoes, including six that were rated EF2, with a fatality occurring from one of them east of Carthage, Texas. Another fatality occurred in Carmel, Indiana when severe thunderstorm winds blew a tree down onto a man while he was in his backyard.

March 28 was expected to feature more severe weather with a 15% risk contour issued from Central South Carolina to the Hampton Roads area in Virginia on March 25. An enhanced risk of severe thunderstorms was then issued for the Hampton Roads area on March 27 due to a 30% hatched area for wind damage. A large portion of Southeast and Eastern United States extending from Southeastern Mississippi to Southern New England were put under slight and marginal risks as well. Wind damage was the main threat, although isolated tornadoes and large hail were also possible. One EF1 tornado did touch down in Alabama during the early morning hours, but despite multiple tornado warnings were issued that afternoon, no other tornadoes were confirmed and no severe reports came from the enhanced risk area. However, a line of showers and isolated storms did intensify over Western Maryland, causing widespread wind damage from the Blue Ridge Mountains in Maryland to Central Jersey, including across the entire Philadelphia metropolitan area. A minor injury occurred in Gap, Pennsylvania due to a barn being blown over while a 76 mph (122 km/h) wind gust was observed in Odessa, Delaware. Some scattered severe weather also occurred in Southeastern United States with an injury occurring when severe thunderstorm winds blew a tree onto a home in Lilburn, Georgia. The severe weather threat ended that night when all the storms pushed offshore into the Atlantic Ocean.

== Confirmed tornadoes ==
Confirmed tornadoes by Enhanced Fujita rating
EFU	EF0	EF1	EF2	EF3	EF4	EF5	Total
2	10	16	10	4	1	0	43

=== March 24 event ===
List of confirmed tornadoes – Wednesday, March 24, 2021 (Note: All dates are based on the local time zone where the tornado touched down; however, all times are in Coordinated Universal Time for consistency.)
EF#	Location	County / Parish	State	Start Coord.	Time (UTC)	Path length	Max width
EFU	NNE of Aleman	Hamilton	TX	31.69°N 98.01°W	00:03–00:05	0.95 mi (1.53 km)	50 yd (46 m)
EFU	The tornado was reported by multiple chasers. No damage was reported.						
EFU	NW of Norse	Bosque	TX	31.81°N 97.75°W	00:32–00:35	0.53 mi (0.85 km)	50 yd (46 m)
EFU	An intermittent tornado produced no damage.						

=== March 25 event ===
List of confirmed tornadoes – Thursday, March 25, 2021
EF#	Location	County / Parish	State	Start Coord.	Time (UTC)	Path length	Max width
EF3	SE of Moundville Airport to WNW of Low Gap	Hale, Tuscaloosa	AL	32.9386°N 87.5753°W	17:16–17:30	11.11 mi (17.88 km)	1,400 yd (1,300 m)
EF3	Hundreds of trees were snapped or uprooted in the Talladega National Forest by this large, strong tornado. Some debarking occurred in northeastern Hale County, and all trees in the direct path were snapped in the worst affected areas, earning a low-end EF3 rating. A large high-end EF1 tornado would move over this same path on November 29, 2022, and a high-end EF2 tornado would move over both previous tornado paths on January 12, 2023.						
EF3	SW of West Blocton to Eagle Point to NE of Vandiver	Bibb, Shelby, St. Clair	AL	33.1157°N 87.1707°W	17:53–19:02	50.13 mi (80.68 km)	1,140 yd (1,040 m)
EF3	See section on this tornado – Five people were injured.						
EF1	S of Memphis, AL	Noxubee (MS), Pickens (AL)	MS, AL	33.0135°N 88.3517°W	18:35–18:42	6.6 mi (10.6 km)	515 yd (471 m)
EF1	This multiple-vortex tornado began in Noxubee County, causing no damage as it quickly crossed the state line. Damage in Pickens County consisted of an irrigation pivot being knocked over and a house sustaining roof damage. Several trees were snapped or uprooted along the path.						
EF3	SE of Ragland to Southeastern Ohatchee to W of Pleasant Gap	Calhoun, Cherokee	AL	33.7026°N 86.1053°W	19:31–20:27	38.17 mi (61.43 km)	1,700 yd (1,600 m)
EF3	6 deaths – See section on this tornado – Ten people were injured.						
EF1	NW of Eutaw to SW of Knoxville	Greene	AL	32.8781°N 87.9756°W	20:57–21:16	12.05 mi (19.39 km)	600 yd (550 m)
EF1	A barn lost a portion of its roof and numerous trees were snapped or uprooted.						
EF0	W of Whitmire	Laurens	SC	34.506°N 81.720°W	20:59–21:02	2.14 mi (3.44 km)	25 yd (23 m)
EF0	A weak tornado downed about a dozen trees in the Sumter National Forest.						
EF3	W of Greensboro to Eastern Centreville to WSW of Wilsonville	Hale, Perry, Bibb, Chilton, Shelby	AL	32.6892°N 87.7387°W	21:26–23:04	79.66 mi (128.20 km)	2,300 yd (2,100 m)
EF3	See section on this tornado – 13 people were injured.						
EF1	S of Center Point	Jefferson	AL	33.5686°N 86.707°W	21:48–21:53	4.78 mi (7.69 km)	700 yd (640 m)
EF1	This tornado tracked just south of I-59, damaging approximately 42 homes in the Roebuck area just east of Birmingham–Shuttlesworth International Airport. Most of damage to these homes was caused by falling trees.						
EF2	E of Butler to NNE of Sweet Water	Choctaw, Marengo	AL	32.13°N 88.04°W	00:10–00:26	12.08 mi (19.44 km)	430 yd (390 m)
EF2	In Choctaw County, the tornado heavily damaged a house, shifting it 6 feet (1.8 m) off its foundation, tore the part of the roof from a shed, uprooted several large trees, and snapped a power pole. In Marengo County, a mobile home was destroyed and thrown 50 yards (46 m). A storage building and a barn were destroyed, and another a barn was heavily damaged. Numerous trees were uprooted and snapped. The end point of the path is uncertain, as the tornado moved into an area with no road access. In November 2023, this tornado was reanalyzed and underwent multiple changes. In Choctaw County, the tornado's track was upgraded from EF1 damage to high-end EF2 damage based on widespread tree damage viewable from Worldview satellite imagery. The path length was adjusted from 0.1 mi (0.16 km) to 2.54 mi (4.09 km). The path width was adjusted from 100 yd (91 m) to 430 yd (390 m).						
EF2	ENE of Waynesboro to NW of Summertown	Wayne, Lewis, Lawrence	TN	35.34°N 87.71°W	00:30–00:59	22.12 mi (35.60 km)	350 yd (320 m)
EF2	This strong tornado destroyed a few outbuildings, ripped the roofs off several homes, and uprooted hundreds of trees. Five TVA high-power electric steel poles were bent, causing widespread power outages in Wayne County. The tornado crossed the Natchez Trace Parkway in the Napier area, causing minor damage. One person sustained minor injuries.						
EF1	N of Taylorsville	Bartow	GA	34.092°N 84.9943°W	01:08–01:10	1.68 mi (2.70 km)	125 yd (114 m)
EF1	A brief tornado snapped and uprooted numerous trees, with one large tree falling on a cabin. An irrigation pivot was also flipped.						
EF1	E of Nolensville to Western Smyrna	Rutherford	TN	35.95°N 86.61°W	01:11–01:14	2.23 mi (3.59 km)	100 yd (91 m)
EF1	Dozens of homes sustained minor to moderate roof damage in a residential area on the west side of Smyrna.						
EF0	SE of Gladeville	Wilson	TN	36.05°N 86.42°W	01:25–01:28	3.2 mi (5.1 km)	75 yd (69 m)
EF0	This tornado touched down just north of the Nashville Superspeedway and moved northeast. Several trees were downed, and several buildings sustained roof damage, including a few warehouses.						
EF0	Rosine	Ohio	KY	37.4476°N 86.749°W	01:32–01:33	0.7 mi (1.1 km)	50 yd (46 m)
EF0	An intermittent tornado caused minor roof damage to a Dollar General store in town, pushed a mobile home off its foundation, damaged the roof of another, and tore the carport from an RV. Trees were uprooted and snapped and a telephone pole was sheared off.						
EF2	NNW of Cooper to ENE of Lyle	Chilton, Coosa	AL	32.8086°N 86.5578°W	02:01–02:21	14.67 mi (23.61 km)	850 yd (780 m)
EF2	This tornado downed trees and caused shingle damage in Chilton County. After crossing Lake Mitchell, the tornado reached low-end EF2 intensity, ripping the roofs off of a couple of houses near the lake. More trees were downed northeast of the location before the tornado moved away from the lake and dissipated.						
EF0	SE of Clarkson	Grayson	KY	37.4833°N 86.1563°W	02:16–02:17	1 mi (1.6 km)	40 yd (37 m)
EF0	Two houses sustained roof, window, and siding damage, a garage was destroyed, and a few trees were snapped and uprooted. Swirl marks were left in a field as well.						
EF1	N of Hodgenville	Larue	KY	37.6255°N 85.7671°W	02:44–02:49	4.7 mi (7.6 km)	75 yd (69 m)
EF1	Barns were damaged, some significantly. Trees were snapped or uprooted, chain link fence was bent at a 90-degree angle, a lawn mower was blown 50 yards (46 m), and a garbage can was thrown 150 yards (140 m). Swirl marks were left in fields as well.						
EF2	W of Wadley to NE of Roanoke	Tallapoosa, Clay, Randolph	AL	33.0942°N 85.771°W	02:55–03:31	31.29 mi (50.36 km)	1,000 yd (910 m)
EF2	A large high-end EF2 tornado began in southeast Clay County, striking Sikesville. It then moved northeastward through Randolph County before lifting just shy of the Georgia state line near Wehadkee. Total roof loss occurred and most of the exterior walls were collapsed at two residences, one of which was a 100-year-old cabin. An agricultural building suffered significant structural damage, and numerous homes and a mobile home sustained varying degrees of roof damage. A fire department building was also damaged, and many trees were downed along the path. Minutes later, the same supercell produced the EF4 tornado that impacted Franklin and Newnan, Georgia.						
EF4	WSW of Franklin to Newnan to Northern Peachtree City	Heard, Coweta, Fayette	GA	33.2533°N 85.1895°W	03:37–04:30	38.56 mi (62.06 km)	1,850 yd (1,690 m)
EF4	See section on this tornado – One indirect fatality was attributed to this tornado as a result of a medical issue.						
EF1	Northern Cartersville	Bartow	GA	34.213°N 84.833°W	03:55–04:00	2.76 mi (4.44 km)	200 yd (180 m)
EF1	The windows, doors, and portions of a wall were blown out at a gas station in the northern part of Cartersville. Large portions of the roof of a warehouse were peeled back, with metal panels thrown hundreds of yards. Several homes in the area had shingles and sections of their roofs peeled back. Many trees were snapped and uprooted, with some falling on homes. No warning was issued for this tornado, and five people were injured.						

=== March 26 event ===
List of confirmed tornadoes – Friday, March 26, 2021
EF#	Location	County / Parish	State	Start Coord.	Time (UTC)	Path length	Max width
EF1	NE of Middlebury	Addison	VT	44.0267°N 73.1449°W	17:40–17:41	0.65 mi (1.05 km)	75 yd (69 m)
EF1	A barrel was thrown into the window of a home, shattering it. Softwood trees were snapped or uprooted. A garage attached to a home was blown off its foundation and collapsed, and the roof of the home was also damaged. A car was also flipped, and multiple farm buildings lost roofing. More trees were snapped before the tornado dissipated. Two people were injured. This became the second confirmed March tornado to occur in Vermont in recorded history.						

=== March 27 event ===
List of confirmed tornadoes – Saturday, March 27, 2021
EF#	Location	County / Parish	State	Start Coord.	Time (UTC)	Path length	Max width
EF1	SE of Huron	Chester, Henderson	TN	35.53°N 88.528°W	21:38–21:44	2.97 mi (4.78 km)	300 yd (270 m)
EF1	A home lost part of its roof and several storage buildings were damaged or destroyed. Many trees were snapped or uprooted along the path, one of which landed on a home and caused roof damage.						
EF0	NW of Reagan	Henderson	TN	35.5452°N 88.3671°W	21:54–21:55	0.57 mi (0.92 km)	50 yd (46 m)
EF0	A brief tornado uprooted trees.						
EF0	S of Perryville	Decatur	TN	35.554°N 88.064°W	22:12–22:13	0.48 mi (0.77 km)	75 yd (69 m)
EF0	Video was taken of a tornado over open country. No damage occurred.						
EF0	NE of Whitton	Mississippi	AR	35.5192°N 90.2531°W	23:01–23:02	0.68 mi (1.09 km)	50 yd (46 m)
EF0	Trees were uprooted and a power pole was damaged.						
EF2	SW of Rusk to NW of Sacul	Cherokee, Nacogdoches	TX	31.6884°N 95.2293°W	23:04–23:38	20.53 mi (33.04 km)	500 yd (460 m)
EF2	Mainly tree damage occurred along the path of this tornado, with large tree trunks snapped in some areas. A metal outbuilding was severely damaged, and a house had its metal roof peeled back as well.						
EF0	W of Bassett	Mississippi	AR	35.5376°N 90.1708°W	23:11–23:13	1.09 mi (1.75 km)	80 yd (73 m)
EF0	A brief tornado crossed I-55, uprooting trees, blowing down a sign, and blowing over a semi.						
EF0	NNW of Parkin	Cross	AR	35.34°N 90.61°W	23:16–23:17	0.45 mi (0.72 km)	50 yd (46 m)
EF0	A brief tornado that was spotted by a storm chaser caused no damage.						
EF1	S of Marie to N of Driver	Mississippi	AR	35.5998°N 90.0819°W	23:21–23:27	3.9 mi (6.3 km)	100 yd (91 m)
EF1	Power poles were broken along AR 14 south of Marie. Further northeast, a mobile home was heavily damaged, a storage building was destroyed, and tree limbs were damaged.						
EF1	SE of Osceola, AR	Mississippi (AR), Lauderdale (TN)	AR, TN	35.6639°N 89.9481°W	23:37–23:45	4.93 mi (7.93 km)	150 yd (140 m)
EF1	Just west of the Mississippi River, the tornado broke power poles at an industrial facility. After crossing across the river into Tennessee, the tornado destroyed a barn before dissipating.						
EF2	Mount Enterprise to N of Gary City	Rusk, Panola	TX	31.9009°N 94.7138°W	23:59–00:31	22.29 mi (35.87 km)	300 yd (270 m)
EF2	A strong tornado first touched down just outside of Mount Enterprise and moved directly through town. Multiple homes sustained roof damage in town, and a few had large portions of their roofs blown off entirely. It then moved into Panola County, causing EF2 damage to trees near Lake Murvaul, damaging outbuildings, and tearing a large section of roof from a church before dissipating. This tornado came from the same storm that produced the EF2 Rusk tornado.						
EF1	N of St. Jacob to Highland	Madison	IL	38.7323°N 89.7697°W	00:08–00:15	5.29 mi (8.51 km)	700 yd (640 m)
EF1	North of St. Jacob, the tornado toppled several trees and tore part of the roof off a metal shed. Farther east of town, homes sustained minor shingle damage and a power pole was snapped. The tornado then struck Highland, where a large metal shed and a barn were completely destroyed, and other outbuildings were damaged. The roof of the shed was lofted into nearby trees, and a wooden 2x4 from the shed penetrated the roof of a nearby building. Trees and power lines were downed in town, homes sustained shingle and soffit damage, a semi-trailer was tipped over, and a trampoline was thrown.						
EF2	E of Carthage	Panola	TX	32.0982°N 94.3089°W	00:38–01:05	15.84 mi (25.49 km)	1,600 yd (1,500 m)
EF2	1 death – This large, strong wedge tornado touched shortly after the previous EF2 tornado dissipated, damaging numerous trees and homes along its path. Some homes sustained major structural damage, including several that had their roofs torn off, and one that had its entire second floor blown away and destroyed, with partial collapse of exterior walls on the first floor. Another house was pushed off of its block foundation, and a mobile home was swept away and completely destroyed. Outbuildings were also destroyed, with sheet metal wrapped around trees, and a truck was thrown 50 yd (46 m). A metal fire department building had an exterior wall ripped off as well. Many trees were snapped or uprooted, and one tree fell on a manufactured home, killing a person and injuring another.						
EF1	W of Keatchie	De Soto, Caddo	LA	32.1792°N 93.9851°W	01:08–01:13	3.5 mi (5.6 km)	480 yd (440 m)
EF1	This tornado came from the same storm that produced the three EF2 tornadoes in Texas. Numerous trees were snapped or uprooted.						
EF2	S of Reydell to ESE of De Witt	Jefferson, Arkansas	AR	34.1548°N 91.5722°W	01:23–01:54	18.56 mi (29.87 km)	600 yd (550 m)
EF2	Power poles were snapped near Reydell at the beginning of the path of this strong stovepipe tornado. In Arkansas County to the south of De Witt, several structures were damaged or destroyed, with the most significant damage occurring at the intersection of US 165 and AR 276. A rice mill sustained severe damage at this location, and a large metal grain silo was lofted from this structure and carried several hundred yards into a field. A nearby mobile home was destroyed, and additional power poles were snapped in this area. Minor tree and outbuilding damage occurred farther along the path before the tornado dissipated.						
EF1	Southern Stonewall to NNE of Frierson	De Soto, Caddo	LA	32.2378°N 93.8364°W	01:22–01:41	11.97 mi (19.26 km)	675 yd (617 m)
EF1	This tornado was the last of a long-lived tornado family that started near Rusk, Texas. It first struck the south edge of Stonewall, where a detached garage was destroyed, homes sustained roof damage, and trees were downed. Additional damage to trees and an outbuilding occurred farther along the path, and a house sustained shingle damage and also had its chimney blown over before the tornado dissipated.						
EF2	Northern Monticello	Drew	AR	33.6655°N 91.883°W	03:22–03:25	1.6 mi (2.6 km)	400 yd (370 m)
EF2	This strong tornado struck the north edge of Monticello, and tossed multiple construction company trucks up to 100 yd (91 m) into a field, leaving them severely damaged. A trailer was thrown through the front wall of the construction company, which had roof decking torn off and windows blown out. Trees were uprooted and tree limbs were snapped, and several homes in a neighborhood at the beginning of the path also suffered some roof damage.						
EF1	Independence	Tate	MS	34.6992°N 89.8239°W	03:45–03:50	2.04 mi (3.28 km)	100 yd (91 m)
EF1	This tornado moved directly through the rural community of Independence. A total of three mobile homes were destroyed, and 17 structures were damaged. An old school building sustained roof and window damage.						
EF0	Southern Rosedale	Bolivar	MS	33.8493°N 91.028°W	04:26–04:27	0.44 mi (0.71 km)	35 yd (32 m)
EF0	This high-end EF0 tornado moved through the south side of Rosedale, ripping a large portion of a metal roof off of a church and damaging its siding and façade. Homes and trees sustained minor damage as well.						
EF2	SE of Shelby	Bolivar	MS	33.9369°N 90.7536°W	04:46–04:51	2.91 mi (4.68 km)	50 yd (46 m)
EF2	The tornado touched down southeast of Shelby and immediately became strong as it struck a house, ripping off its roof and collapsing some exterior walls. A nearby propane tank was shifted, and an outbuilding was destroyed. The tornado then moved northeast and weakened, destroying five empty grain bins and damaging trees before dissipating in an open field.						

=== March 28 event ===
List of confirmed tornadoes – Sunday, March 28, 2021
EF#	Location	County / Parish	State	Start Coord.	Time (UTC)	Path length	Max width
EF1	SSW of Fairview	Cullman	AL	34.1904°N 86.74°W	10:38–10:42	2.11 mi (3.40 km)	100 yd (91 m)
EF1	A couple of farm outbuildings were destroyed and numerous hardwood and softwood trees were uprooted and snapped.						

=== West Blocton–Helena–Eagle Point–Vandiver, Alabama ===
West Blocton–Helena–Eagle Point–Vandiver, Alabama
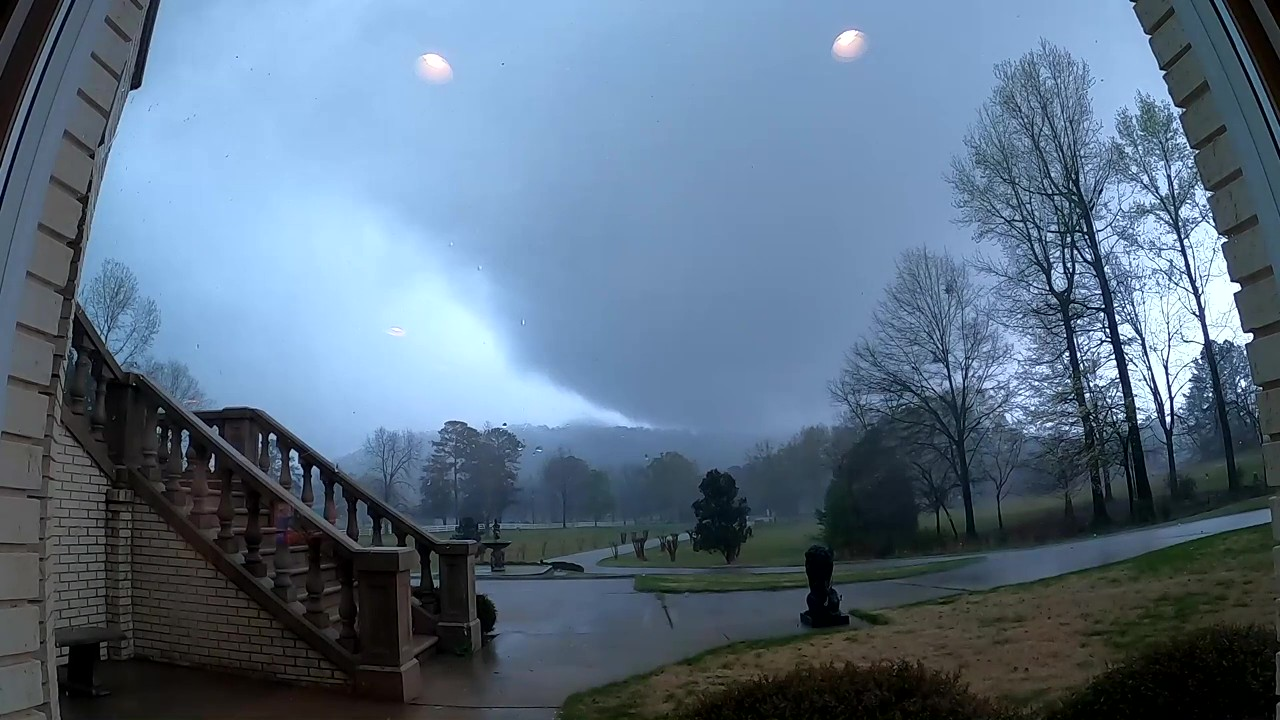
- A doorbell camera still of the tornado as it was passing through southern Birmingham, Alabama.

Meteorological history
- Formed: March 25, 2021, 12:53 p.m. CDT (UTC−05:00)
- Dissipated: March 25, 2021, 02:02 p.m. CDT (UTC−05:00)
- Duration: 1 hour, 9 minutes

EF3 tornado
- on the Enhanced Fujita scale
- Highest winds: 140 mph (230 km/h)

Overall effects
- Fatalities: 0
- Injuries: 5

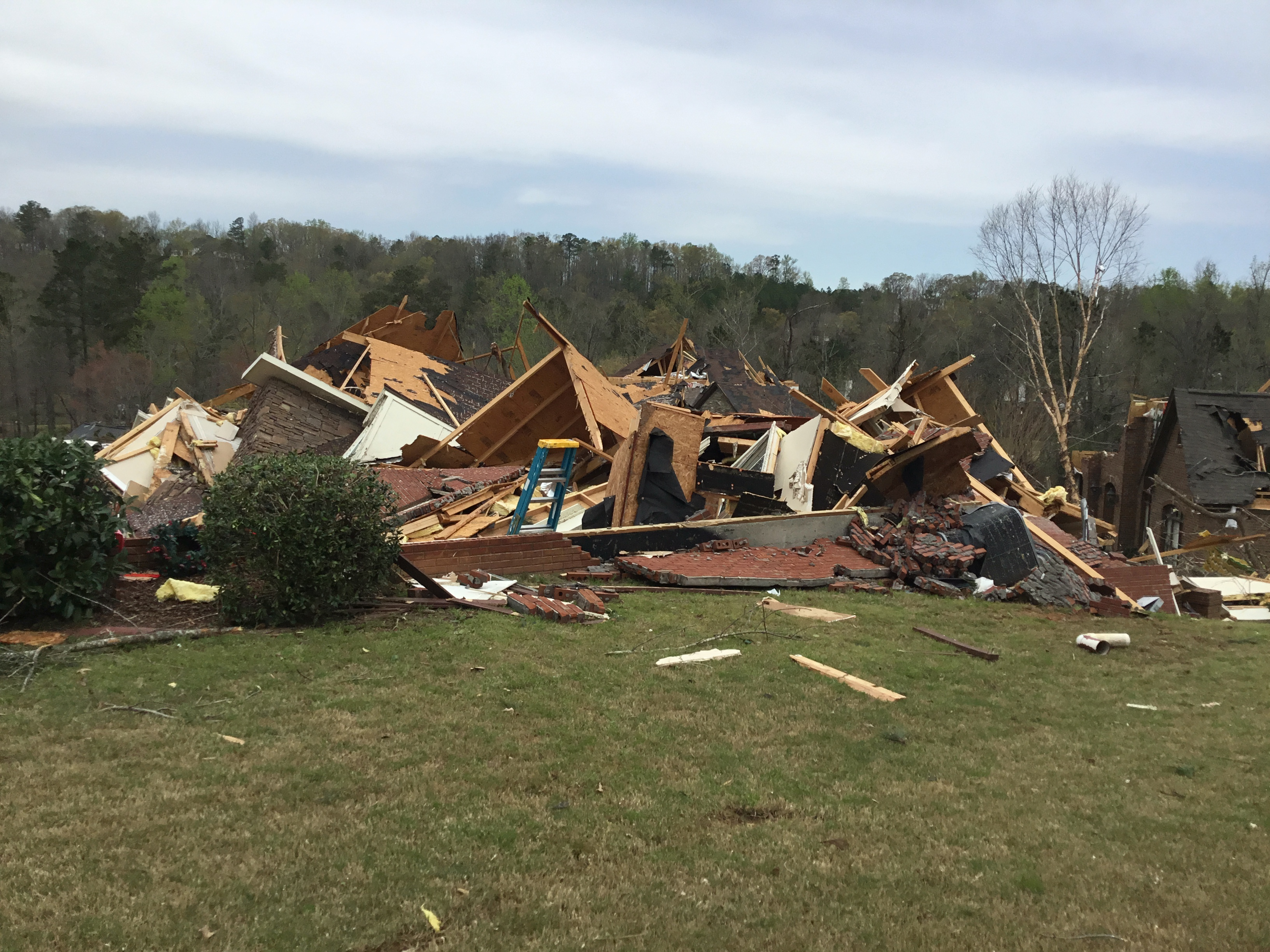
A home that was completely leveled in the Eagle Point neighborhood.

Twenty-three minutes after the Talladega National Forest low-end EF3 tornado lifted, the same parent supercell thunderstorm produced this intense, long-tracked tornado that caused significant damage in the southern suburbs of Birmingham. It first touched down along Vance Road west of West Blocton in Bibb County at 12:53 p.m. CDT (17:53 UTC) and moved northeastward, damaging trees at EF0 to EF1 strength. It quickly strengthened as it passed north of town and briefly reached low-end EF2 intensity, snapping large tree trunks in a wooded area. It then weakened back to EF1 strength, uprooting trees near Hebron before weakening further, causing high-end EF0 damage northeast of the rural community. The tornado then moved into Shelby County, briefly reaching low-end EF1 strength as it uprooted trees. EF1 damage continued south of Turner, as it uprooted more trees before weakening back to EF0 strength as it entered the west side of Helena, causing minor roof damage to homes and downing trees. Mainly shingle, siding, and fence damage was noted in this area, though a house that was under construction collapsed. The tornado then intensified to EF1 strength once again as it moved through the north side of Helena. A few homes along Cunningham Lane sustained partial roof loss, and one home in town sustained destruction of its front porch overhang. The tornado briefly weakened back to EF0 strength before strengthening more significantly at the north edge of Pelham, reaching EF2 intensity as it moved directly through a residential neighborhood. Several homes were significantly damaged along Crosscreek Trail and Wilderness Road, including a few that had their roofs ripped off, and at least two that had an exterior wall knocked down. Trees were uprooted or severely damaged as well. The tornado then continued northeast at EF1 strength, damaging or snapping numerous trees as it moved farther into the southern suburbs of Birmingham, and proceeded to cross US 31 and I-65. A few mobile homes and some businesses sustained roof damage along this corridor. East of the interstate, a manufactured home was completely destroyed at high-end EF1 intensity and more trees were damaged. More trees were snapped along Indian Trail as the tornado traversed mountainous terrain into Indian Springs Village, where additional trees were downed and homes sustained minor to moderate damage. As the tornado passed New Hope, it briefly regained low-end EF2 intensity as it paralleled SR 119, snapping several tree trunks and uprooting more trees, some of which fell on homes in a neighborhood. The tornado then caused high-end EF0 to EF1 damage to homes and trees in another neighborhood before briefly reaching low-end EF2 strength again as it moved directly over SR 119, where more large tree trunks were snapped.

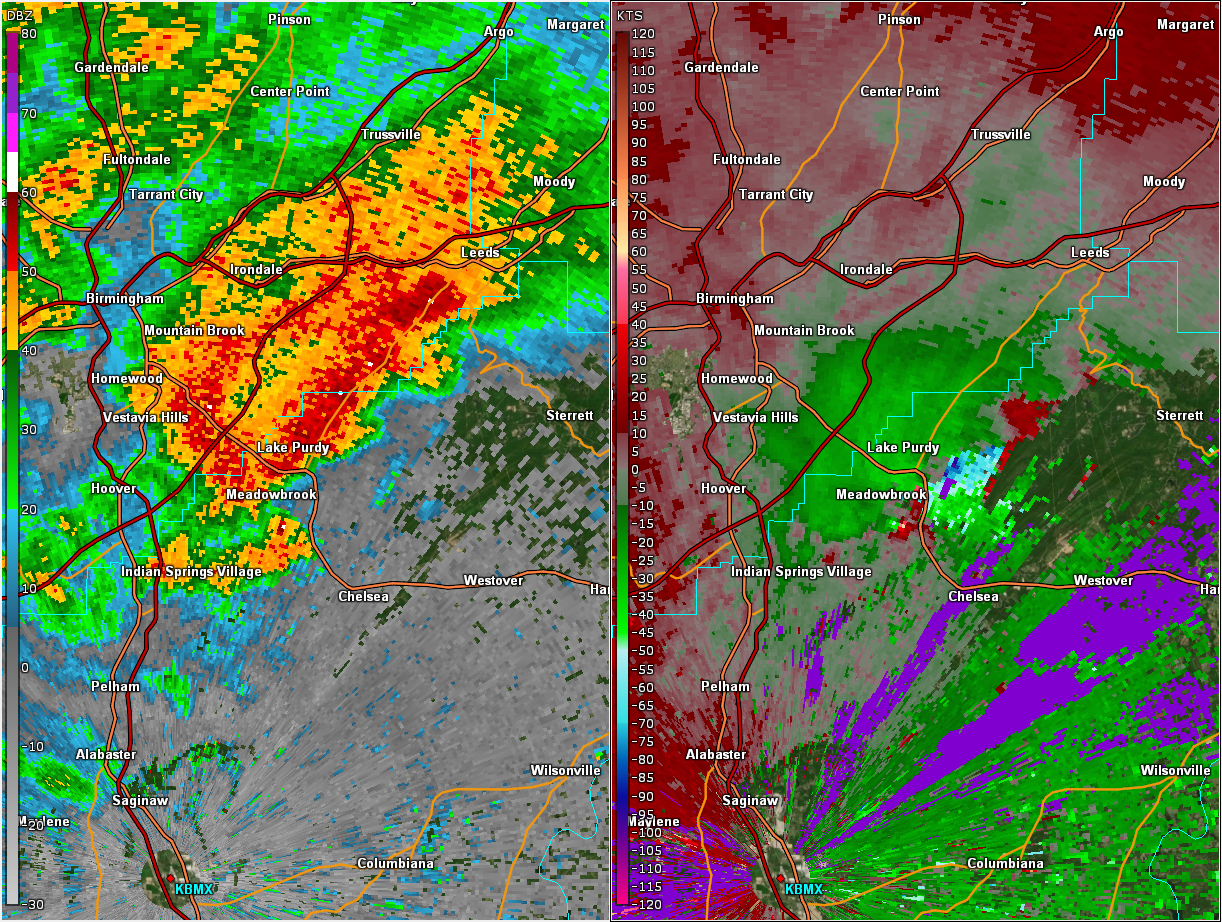
Radar image of EF3 Eagle Point tornado at peak intensity as it struck Eagle Point at 1841Z on 3–25–2021.

The tornado then caused EF1 tree damage as it passed over Beaver Lake and Lunker Lake, before reaching its peak intensity as it struck the Eagle Point neighborhood just east of Meadowbrook. One home in the area lost its roof and most exterior walls, while another poorly anchored home was pushed off its foundation and leveled. Damage to these two homes was rated low-end EF3. Multiple other homes in the neighborhood suffered up to high-end EF2 damage, including one that was shifted off its foundation, and others which sustained varying degrees of roof and exterior wall loss. Trees in the area were also heavily damaged. A tornado emergency was issued for this storm shortly before the tornado struck the neighborhood, as a large debris ball was seen on radar. Northeast of this location, the tornado continued at EF2 strength, and more homes and trees suffered heavy damage as the tornado approached and crossed over US 280. Homes in neighborhoods along the west side of the highway sustained roof loss, along with some collapse of exterior walls. Continuing northeastward past the highway, the tornado momentarily became weak again, causing EF1 damage to trees and the roofs of homes. The now large tornado was then seen live on ABC 33/40 via a traffic camera at the intersection of US 280 and SR 119 as it crossed Oak Mountain. As the tornado approached Double Oak Mountain, it again attained EF2 strength and struck additional residential areas along Dunnavant Valley Road. Some of the most severe damage in this area occurred in the Greystone Farms subdivision, where homes sustained varying degrees of roof loss, and some had their roofs torn off entirely. Moving farther to the northeast, additional EF2 damage to many trees and a few homes occurred at the Shoal Creek Country Club. The tornado briefly reached peak strength for a second time as it moved through a wooded area at the country club, producing a small area of EF3-level tree damage. It then weakened to EF1 strength as it moved over Double Oak Mountain and struck Vandiver, uprooting trees, and damaging several homes on the northeast side of town. Past Vandiver, high-end EF1 damage occurred as a mobile home and an outbuilding were destroyed farther to the northeast, and more trees were uprooted in the small community of Lawley. The tornado just barely crossed into St. Clair County, snapping some trees at EF1 intensity before dissipating at 2:02 p.m. CDT (19:02 UTC).

The tornado was on the ground for 50.13 miles (80.68 km), had a peak width of 1,140 yards (1,040 m) at its peak, and was rated low-end EF3. It also caused some damage to the home of James Spann, who was covering the event live and communicating with his wife as the tornado approached his home. Five people sustained injuries in the tornado.

=== Macon–Ohatchee–Wellington–Piedmont, Alabama ===
Macon–Ohatchee–Wellington–Piedmont, Alabama
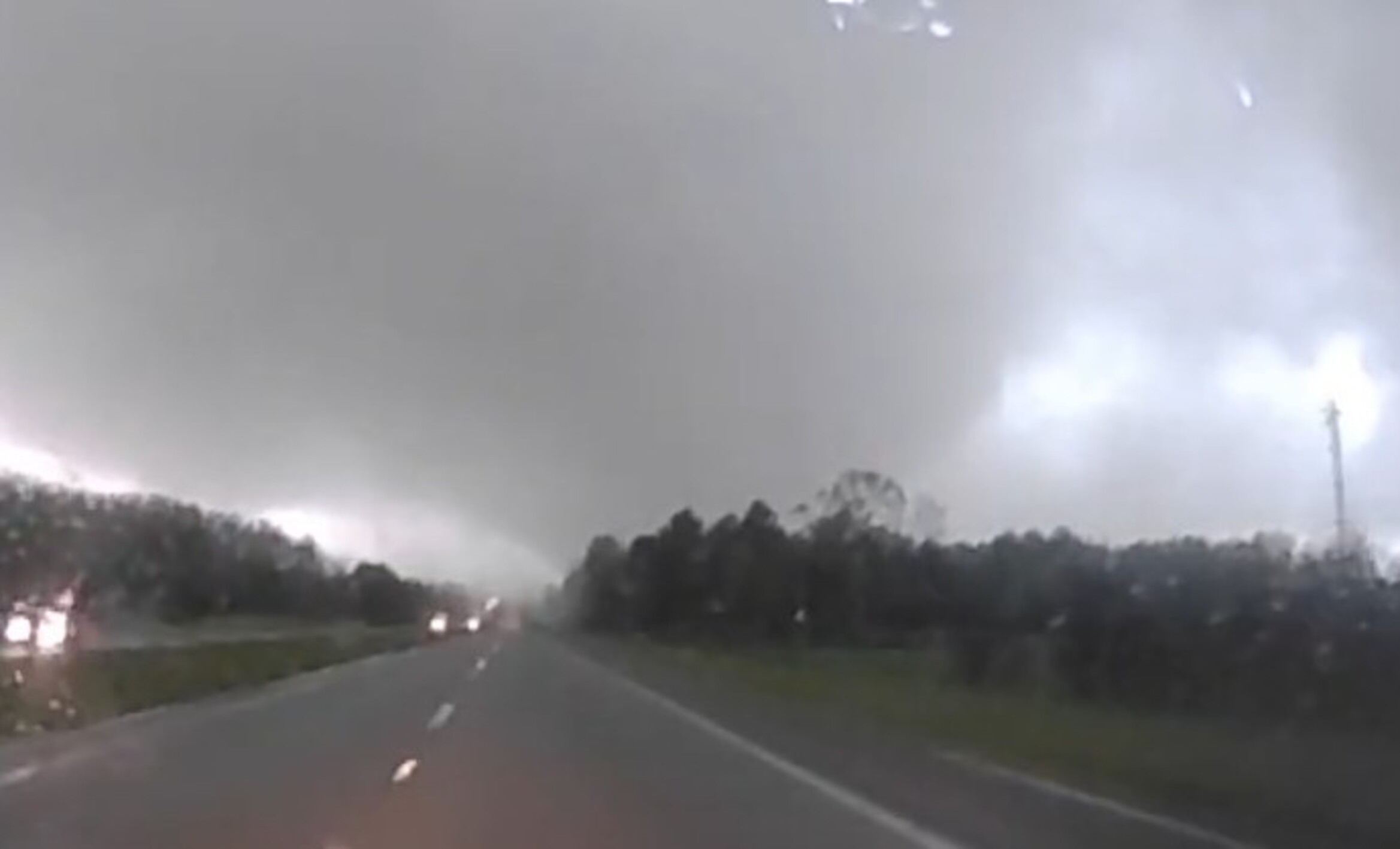
- A dashboard camera still of the tornado near Ohatchee, Alabama.

Meteorological history
- Formed: March 25, 2021, 02:31 p.m. CDT (UTC−05:00)
- Dissipated: March 25, 2021, 03:27 p.m. CDT (UTC−05:00)
- Duration: 56 minutes

EF3 tornado
- on the Enhanced Fujita scale
- Highest winds: 140 mph (230 km/h)

Overall effects
- Fatalities: 6
- Injuries: 10

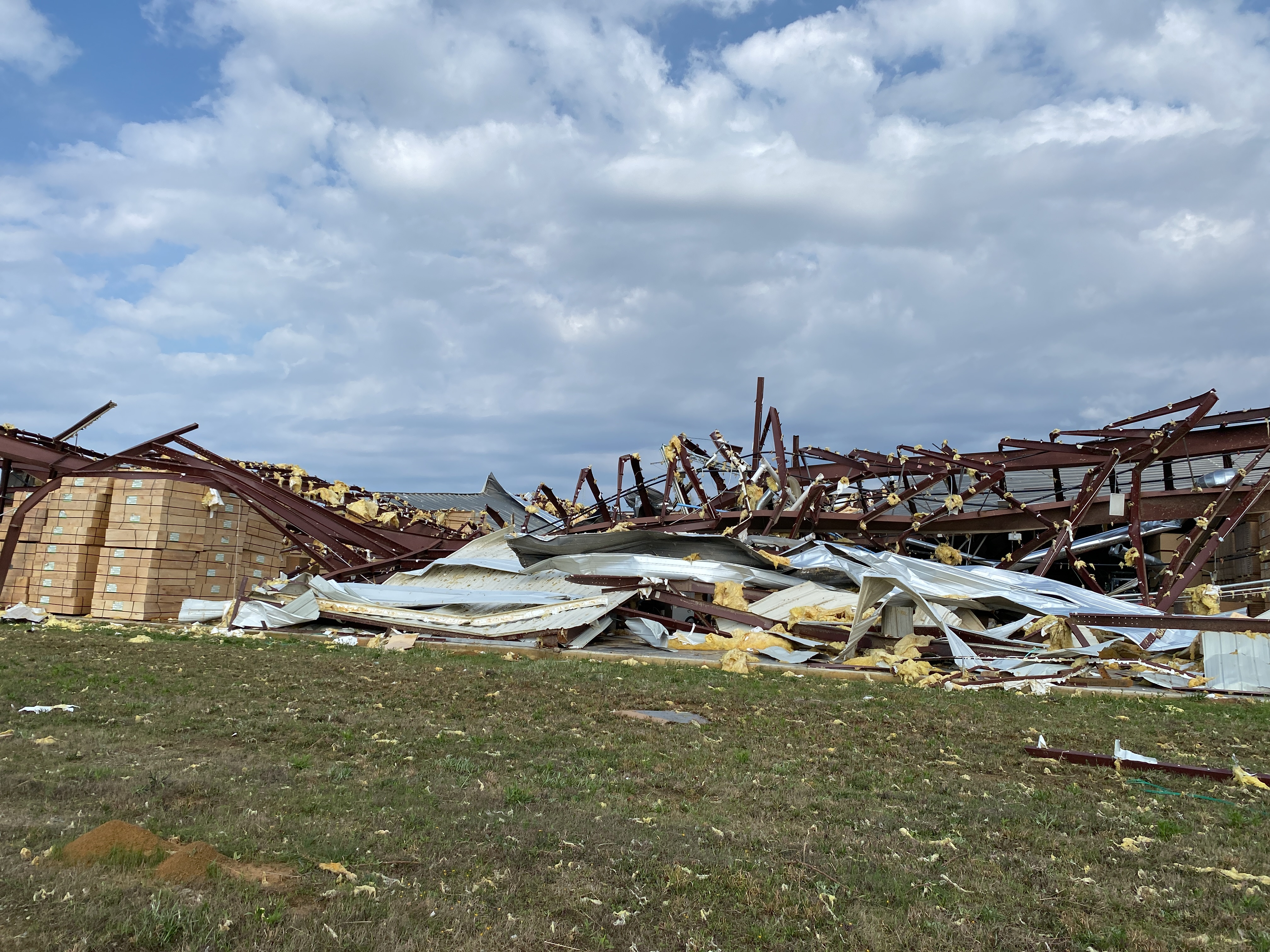
A metal warehouse that was destroyed at EF3 intensity south of Ohatchee, Alabama.

After the previous EF3 tornado that affected the Birmingham area lifted, the same supercell produced another strong tornado, which touched down southeast of Ragland along Boiling Springs Road at about 2:31 p.m. CDT (19:31 UTC). It quickly intensified to high-end EF2 intensity as it moved northeast, snapping or uprooting dozens of trees, damaging the roof of a metal building, and obliterating a mobile home along Simpson Bend Road. Continuing at high-end EF2 strength, the tornado caused major damage in the small community of Macon, destroying several mobile homes, ripping the roofs off of several residences while knocking down some exterior walls, and snapping or uprooting numerous trees. Maintaining its strength, the tornado crossed Ragan Chapel Road, destroying two mobile homes and inflicting major roof damage to a frame home. Northeast of this location, the tornado reached its peak intensity as it destroyed Precision Materials, a manufacturing facility housed in a large metal warehouse building southwest of Ohatchee. The building was almost totally collapsed, with severe twisting and buckling of metal support beams noted, and damage in this area was rated low-end EF3. All the employees inside were moved into a safe shelter in the interior of the building when they received the tornado warning and no one was injured at this location.

The tornado caused more high-end EF2 damage as it crossed SR 77, destroying multiple mobile homes, a church, and a large outbuilding. One of the fatalities occurred in this area along Mudd Street, where a very small and unanchored home collapsed with another fatality occurring nearby. The tornado also downed many trees and snapped power poles, shattered windows, and ripped large sections of roofing off of multiple houses along this segment of the path before continuing to the northeast. It then weakened to high-end EF1 strength as it moved northeastward through the southern and eastern fringes of Ohatchee. Trees, mobile homes, outbuildings, and houses in and around Ohatchee all sustained damage as the tornado approached and crossed SR 144. As it passed near Grayton, it briefly regained EF2 intensity, snapping trees and destroying four mobile homes. A double-wide mobile home was also significantly damaged with three fatalities and multiple significant injuries occurring here. A few other residences and mobile homes in the area were also damaged to a lesser extent. The tornado weakened back to EF1 strength and continued to snap trees and cause roof damage to homes as it approached the western side of Wellington. Homes, outbuildings, and trees were moderately damaged in Wellington as the tornado crossed US 431 before it reached EF2 intensity for a third time east of the highway along Wellington Road, destroying more mobiles homes and snapping more trees. One person was killed in a destroyed movile home, but 13 others survived by sheltering in a family storm pit. One residence had its roof torn off and exterior walls collapsed. Six people survived inside the home by sheltering in an interior closet. Two more residences shifted off their foundations, and several others had their roofs ripped off. Several barns and outbuildings were also destroyed, and a few vehicles were flipped in this area as well.

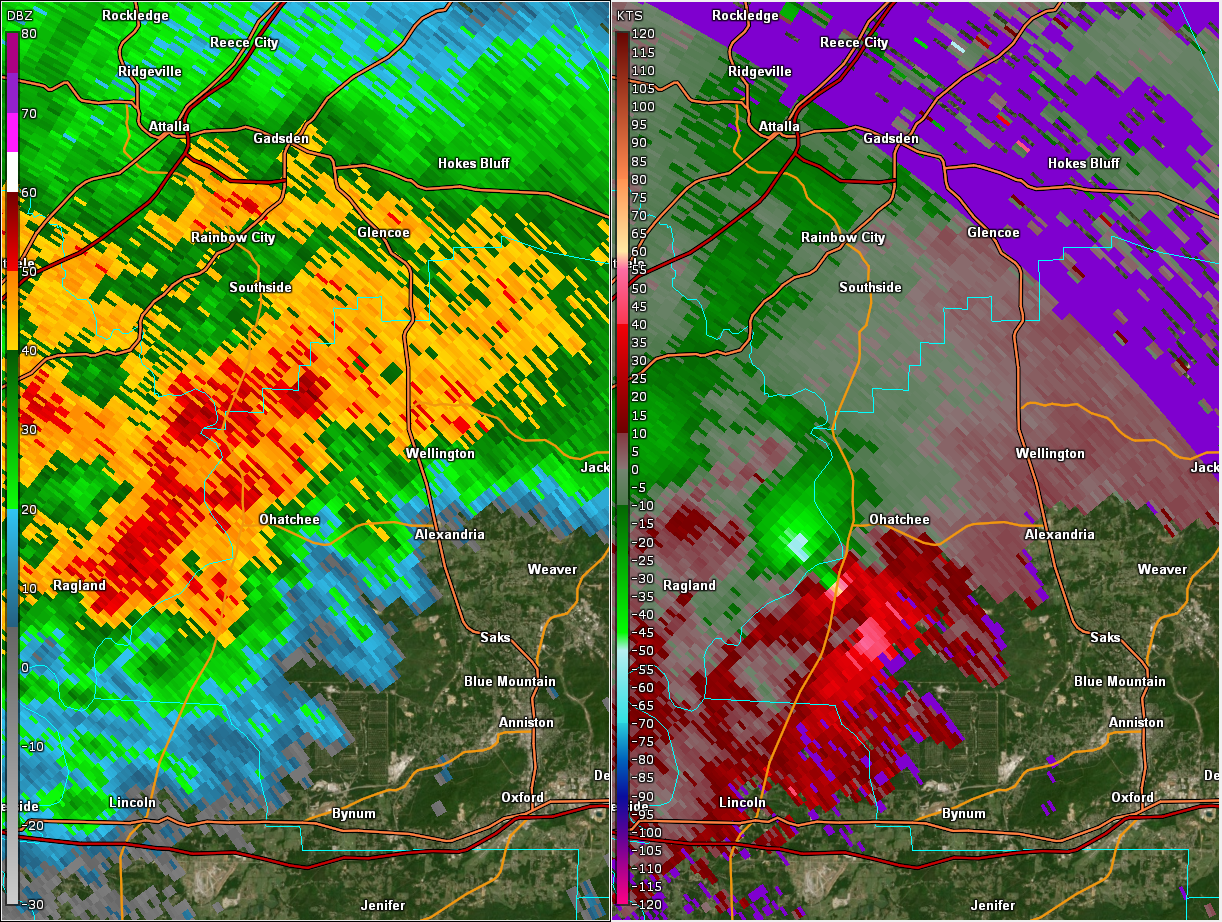
Radar image of EF3 Ohatchee tornado at peak intensity as it entered Ohatchee.

After briefly weakening, the tornado reached EF2 strength again along Old Sulphur Springs Road, destroying mobile homes, ripping the roof off of a house, and damaging trees. The tornado then narrowed some and weakened to EF1 strength as it passed northwest of Jacksonville, damaging a number of mobile homes, outbuildings, and trees. It then intensified to low-end EF2 strength one last time as it passed near Asberry, snapping a number of trees. It also caused some roof damage to homes. It then weakened to high-end EF1 strength near Allsop, damaging several homes and mobile homes along Roy Webb Road and snapping or damaging trees. One mobile home was shifted off its foundation and an outbuilding lost several roof panels. To the northeast along Old Piedmont Gadsden Highway, another outbuilding was completely overturned. The tornado then crossed US 278 northwest of Piedmont, damaging or uprooting trees. Continuing to travel northeast, the tornado caused additional tree damage along Bramlett Road. On Gnatville Road, an outbuilding was leveled while a nearby house sustained minor damage. The tornado then began to quickly narrow and weaken as it crossed into Cherokee County, damaging trees at EF0 strength while crossing SR 9. A house and an outbuilding sustained minor roof damage along County Road 2 as the tornado turned to the east-northeast. Minor tree damage continued to County Road 29 and lights were blown off a stadium light pole at the intersection of County Road 29 and County Road 8 before the tornado dissipated just northwest of Pleasant Gap.

The tornado was rated low-end EF3, travelled 38.17 miles (61.43 km), and was on the ground for 56 minutes, reaching a maximum width of nearly 1 mile (1.6 km). It was the deadliest of the outbreak, with six fatalities. Ten other people were injured, including two people that were taken to the hospital after being trapped in their destroyed homes.

=== Sawyerville–Centreville–Calera–Columbiana, Alabama ===
Sawyerville–Centreville–Calera–Columbiana, Alabama
- A drone shot of the tornado at EF3 intensity near Centreville, Alabama

Meteorological history
- Formed: March 25, 2021, 04:26 p.m. CDT (UTC−05:00)
- Dissipated: March 25, 2021, 06:04 p.m. CDT (UTC−05:00)
- Duration: 1 hour, 38 minutes

EF3 tornado
- on the Enhanced Fujita scale
- Highest winds: 150 mph (240 km/h)

Overall effects
- Fatalities: 0
- Injuries: 13

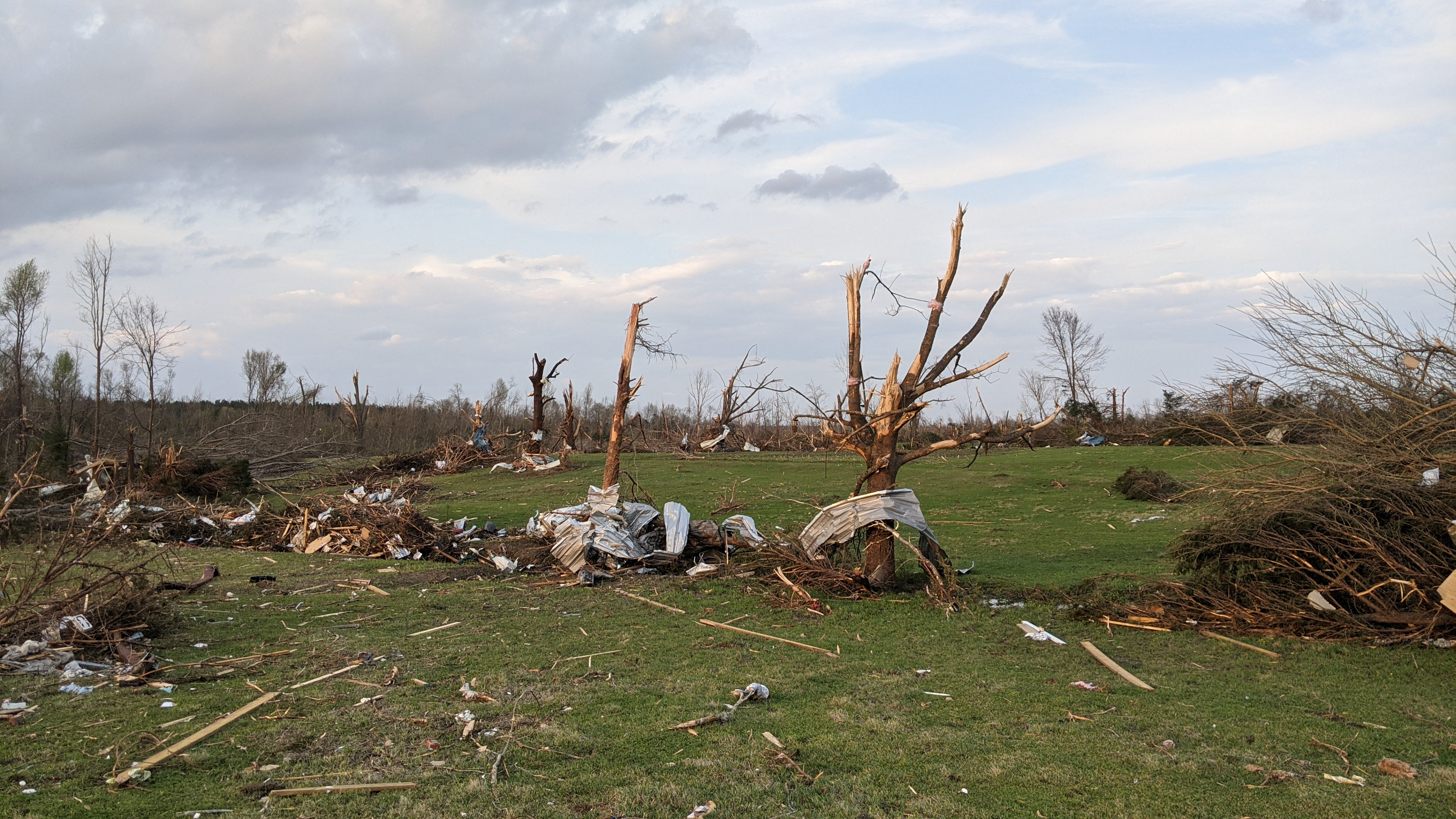
Heavy EF3 damage to trees in a debris-strewn field south of Sawyerville, Alabama.

A very large, intense, and long-tracked tornado first touched down at 4:26 p.m. CDT (21:26 UTC) south of Sawyerville in Hale County along SR 17 and moved northeastward, downing trees at EF1 strength. The first area of significant damage along the path occurred just northeast of this point along County Road 35, where a mobile home was completely destroyed at high-end EF2 intensity. The tornado rapidly strengthened as it approached and crossed County Road 28, quickly reaching its peak intensity and completely destroying a house at mid-range EF3 intensity, which was left with only one wall standing. Fields near this home were strewn with structural debris, and many trees were denuded and debarked, with a wide swath of forest containing hundreds of trees mowed down. Outbuildings and mobile homes were also destroyed in this area, and a few other frame homes were severely damaged. It widened and weakened back to EF2 intensity as it approached SR 14. Continuing northeastward, the large tornado crossed SR 14 between Sawyerville and Greensboro at EF2 strength, destroying mobile homes and outbuildings, and mowing down large swaths of trees. North of SR 14, five Y-shaped metal transmission towers were downed. The tornado then briefly reached low-end EF3 strength again as a large swath of trees was completely flattened near Brown Road. Just past this area, the tornado weakened back to EF2 intensity, and along County Road 21, a mobile home was obliterated and the remnants were swept away. A nearby house lost its roof and several exterior walls as well. The tornado continued at EF2 intensity to the northeast of Greensboro, snapping trees and impacting numerous houses, barns, and outbuildings as it approached then crossed SR 69. A couple of houses sustained complete roof loss and partial collapse of some walls in this area. Farther along the path, a swath of particularly severe of tree damage near County Road 32 was rated EF3. EF2 damage continued just to the northeast near County Road 86 and SR 25, and several site-built homes and mobile homes were damaged. One house was pushed entirely off its foundation, and another sustained collapse of several outer walls.

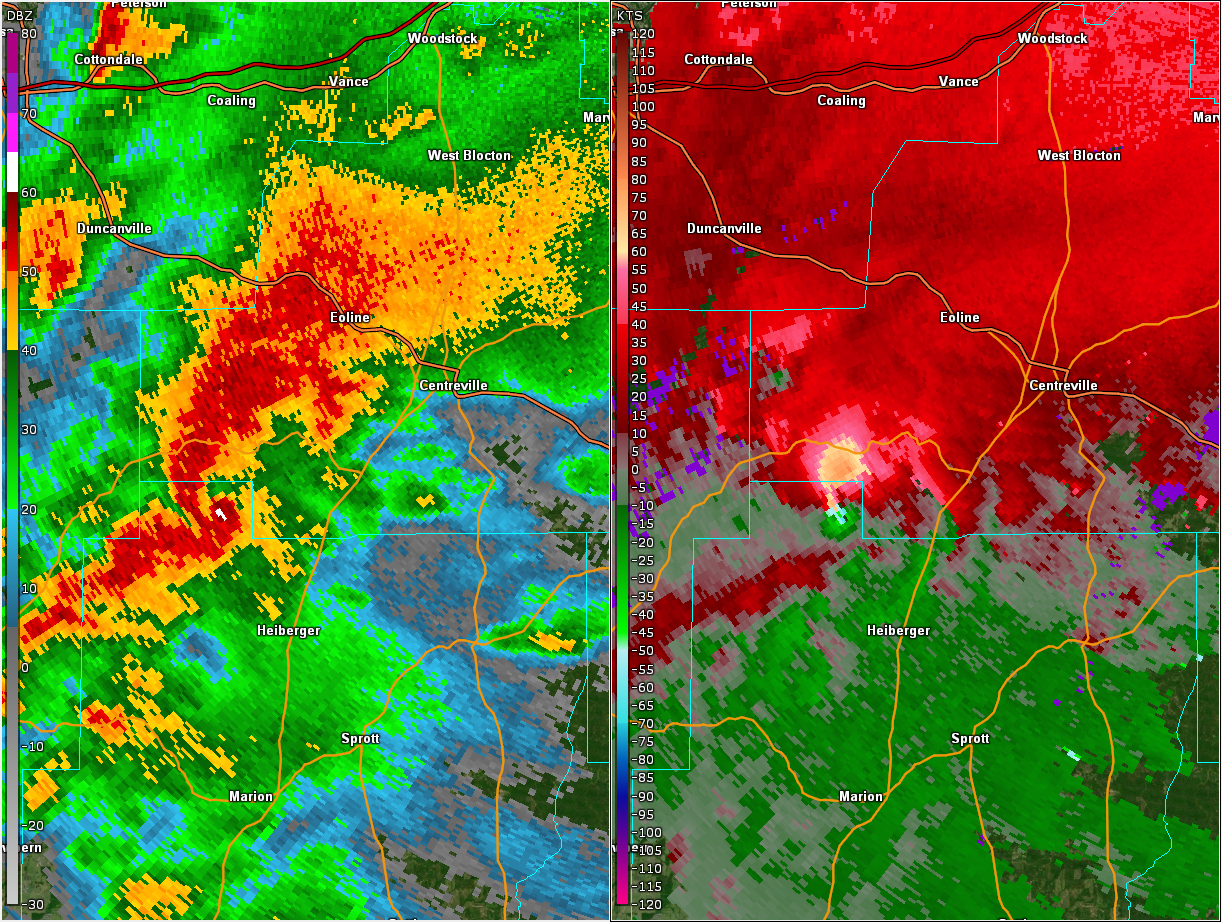
Radar image of EF3 Sawyerville, AL tornado fluctuating between EF2-EF3 as it approached Brent and Centreville at 2155Z on 3–25–2021.

The large wedge tornado maintained EF2-level intensity as it entered Perry County, ripping a large section of roof off a home and blowing away another mobile home. Many more trees were snapped as the tornado moved into the Talladega National Forest. As it crossed County Road 23, EF2 damage continued as a house, a metal building, and a church sustained significant roof and structural damage, and a mobile home was destroyed. Moving northeast, more houses sustained significant structural damage, and another mobile home was destroyed and blown away. The tornado briefly regained EF3 intensity near Mount Ivan Church Road, based on another section of very intense tree damage. The tornado continued producing tree damage rated in the EF1 to EF2 range before reaching the Bibb County line, where it regained EF3 intensity. More intense tree damage occurred in the area of 3 Creek Road and Peach Orchard Road, where an area of dense forest was completely mowed down. It weakened back to EF2 intensity and exited the Talladega National Forest while continuing to produce widespread tree damage, at which point a tornado emergency was issued for this storm as it approached Brent and Centreville. Several homes and mobile homes were damaged as the tornado crossed SR 25 for a second time. It then crossed SR 5 and moved approximately 1 mile (1.6 km) south of the downtown sections of Brent and Centreville. EF2 damage occurred at the southern outskirts of Brent, as a few site-built homes in the area of Belcher Road and Goodson Road sustained roof and structural damage, and several mobile homes, barns, and outbuildings were heavily damaged or destroyed. A few metal outbuildings were badly mangled in this area. The tornado crossed the Cahaba River and then struck the southern and eastern fringes of Centreville. Just trees were downed until the tornado reached the eastern side of Centreville in the area of the Bibb County Airport. A motel, a church, metal warehouse buildings, mobile homes, and some site-built homes were heavily damaged along Stallings Road and Montgomery Road. Structure damage was rated in the EF0 to high-end EF1 range, but a small area of EF3-level tree damage, including some debarking, occurred just west of the airport. The tornado snapped many trees as it crossed U.S. 82 at EF2 strength, and several metal buildings, awnings, and hangars at the airport were damaged by the outer fringes of the circulation. Wooden pallets and pieces of sheet metal were scattered across the airport grounds, and a few small airplanes were moved and flipped. Damage at the airport was rated high-end EF0. The tornado then exited Centreville to the northeast.

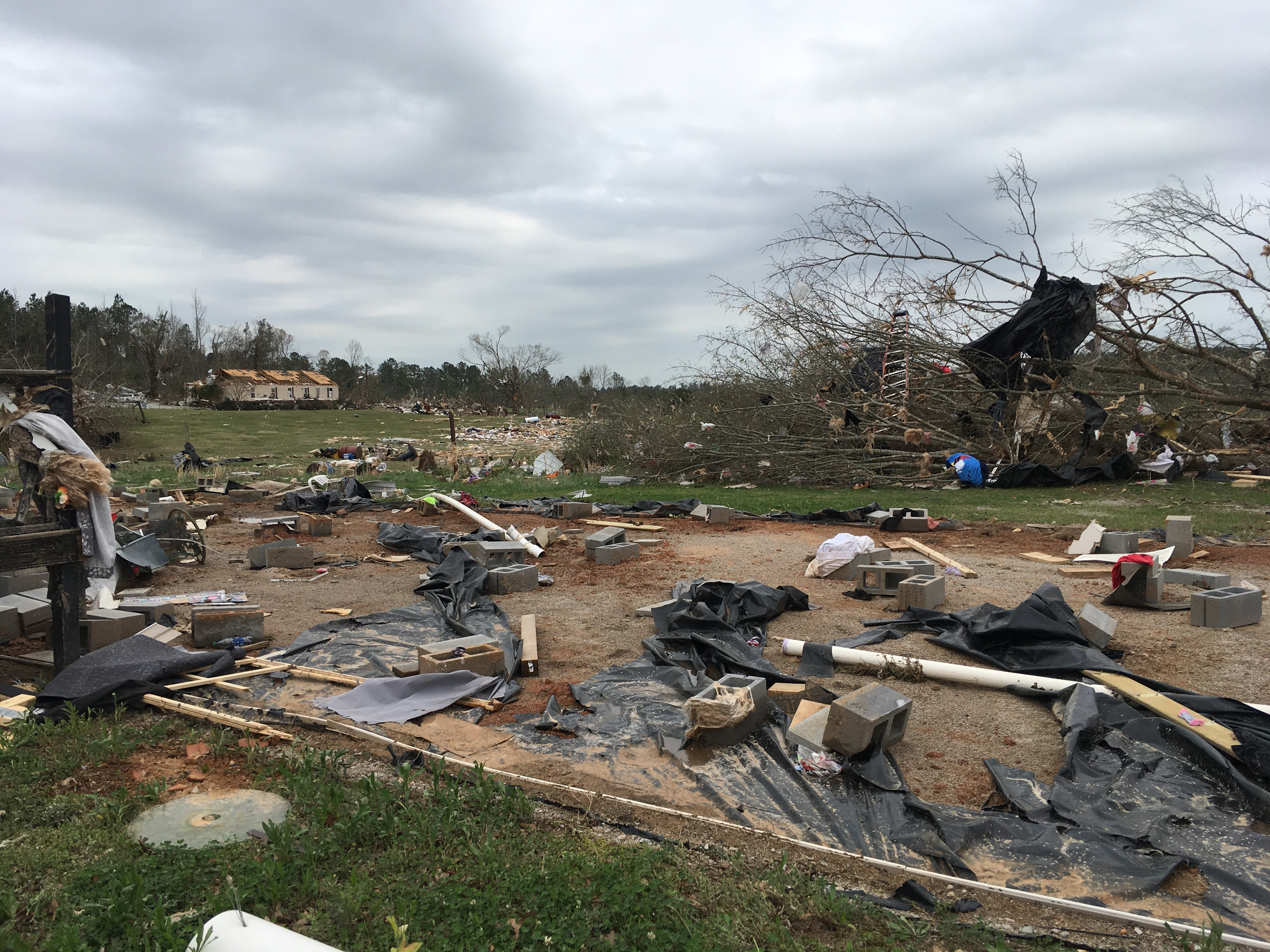
A mobile home that was destroyed at EF2 intensity near Ashby caused by the Sawyerville tornado. EF1 damage to homes can also be seen.

Continuing through rural areas in northeast Bibb County, the tornado produced mostly tree damage consistent with EF1 intensity. Though as it crossed Copperas Creek Road, a mobile home was destroyed and a house sustained heavy roof and structural damage, consistent with EF2 intensity. Severe damage continued into the Ashby community south of Brierfield, and at least four mobile homes were completely destroyed and swept away along Buzzard Road. A few other mobile homes and site-built houses sustained significant damage, mostly to roofs, and Ashby Baptist Church also sustained considerable damage. Damage in this area was rated lower-end EF2; this was the last area of EF2-strength damage surveyed along the path. The tornado then crossed into Chilton County at EF1 intensity, continuing to produce tree damage and damaging the roofs of a house and barn along County Road 54. It quickly entered Shelby County, displaying a multiple-vortex structure as it crossed US 31 and I-65 just south of Calera. A mobile home was completely destroyed and swept away at high-end EF1 strength in this area. Several homes sustained mostly minor roof damage in a subdivision along Timberline Drive as well, just southeast of Calera, as the tornado continued moving northeast.

In rural areas southwest of Columbiana, a couple of outbuildings sustained minor roof damage and more trees were downed, and damage in this area was rated EF0 to EF1. The tornado then struck the south edge of Columbiana at EF1 intensity, and several homes were damaged along Shelby Road and Mooney Road, including one house which suffered partial roof loss and complete destruction of an attached garage. Several more homes and mobile homes sustained EF1 damage to the northeast of town along Mardis Ferry Road and Gibson Farm Road, and more trees were downed. The tornado finally dissipated west-southwest of Wilsonville just before crossing SR 25 for a third time.

The tornado closely paralleled SR 25 for most of its track, having first encountered the highway in Hale County. Tens of thousands of trees were downed along the entire path. The tornado was on the ground for 98 minutes, lifting at 6:04 p.m. CDT (23:04 UTC), and had a maximum width of about 1.3 miles (2.1 km). The tornado was also exceptionally long-tracked, travelling 79.66 miles (128.20 km) across five counties, making it the seventh longest single-tracked tornado in Alabama history. A total of 13 people were injured.

=== Franklin–Newnan–Peachtree City, Georgia ===
Franklin–Newnan–Peachtree City, Georgia
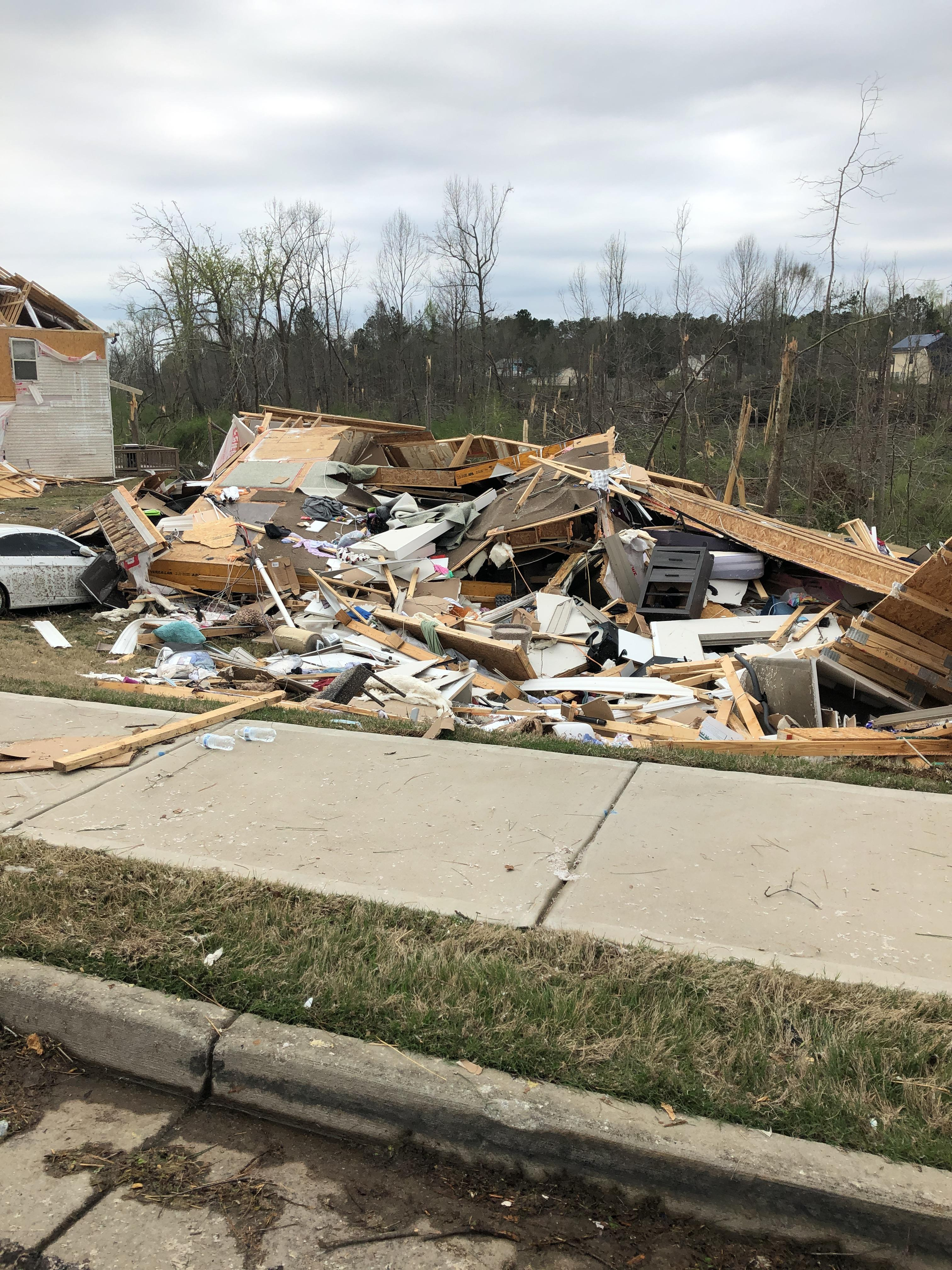
- Low-end EF4 damage to a completely leveled house in Newnan, Georgia.

Meteorological history
- Formed: March 25, 2021, 11:37 p.m. EDT (UTC−04:00)
- Dissipated: March 26, 2021, 12:30 a.m. EDT (UTC−04:00)
- Duration: 53 minutes

EF4 tornado
- on the Enhanced Fujita scale
- Highest winds: 170 mph (270 km/h)

Overall effects
- Fatalities: 1 indirect
- Injuries: 0
- Damage: $20.55 million

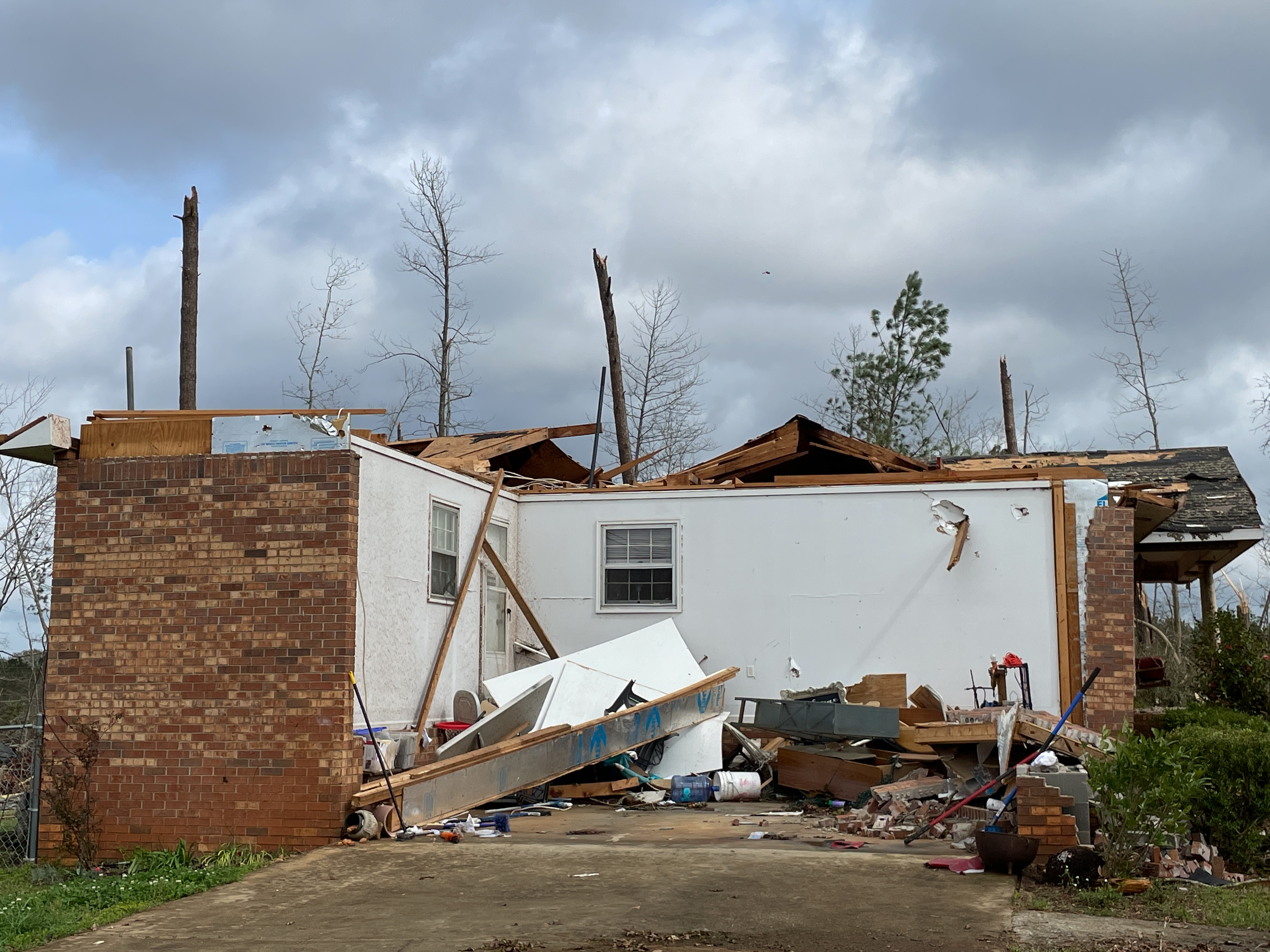
EF2 damage to a home in Franklin from the Newnan tornado.

This very large, violent nighttime tornado caused severe damage in the southern suburbs of Atlanta. It first touched down in western Heard County at 11:37 p.m. EDT (03:37 UTC) and tracked east-northeastward along SR 34 northeast of Texas, initially causing only minor EF0 to EF1 tree damage as it passed north of Viola. It widened and intensified before moving into Franklin, causing high-end EF2 damage in the downtown area. Multiple businesses were heavily damaged, metal beams were twisted at a large industrial building, which lost its roof and a wall, and some other metal buildings were damaged to a lesser degree. A gas station awning and a semi-trailer were blown over as well. Homes were damaged in residential areas of Franklin, and two had their roofs torn off. Sheds and detached garages were destroyed, and many trees were snapped, uprooted, or damaged throughout the town. This included a few pine trees that sustained some low-end debarking. The tornado weakened back to EF1 strength and narrowed as it crossed US 27 and exited Franklin. It continued to parallel GA 34 as it approached the county line, snapping and uprooting trees in a heavily forested area. The tornado crossed into Coweta County at 11:54 p.m. EDT (03:54 UTC) and began to move toward Newnan. Along JD Walton Road, EF1 damage continued as the tornado destroyed an outbuilding and uprooted and snapped numerous trees. As it crossed Smokey Road, Holbrook Road, and Victorian Lane, the tornado began to widen again and reached low-end EF2 intensity, snapping many large trees and causing roof and window damage to homes as it entered more populated areas at the southwestern edge of Newnan. The most intense damage in this area occurred in the Mountain Creek and Woodlawn Farms subdivisions. The tornado then grew tremendously and reached EF3 intensity as it moved across Timberland Trail and Smokey Ridge Drive, damaging or destroying numerous homes as it moved through multiple subdivisions. Many homes sustained roof loss and collapse of exterior walls, and one home was left with only its back wall standing. Severe tree damage occurred in this area, cars were flipped, and a gas station awning was shredded. The first of three tornado emergencies was then issued at 12:06 a.m. EDT (04:06 UTC) as a large debris signature appeared on radar.

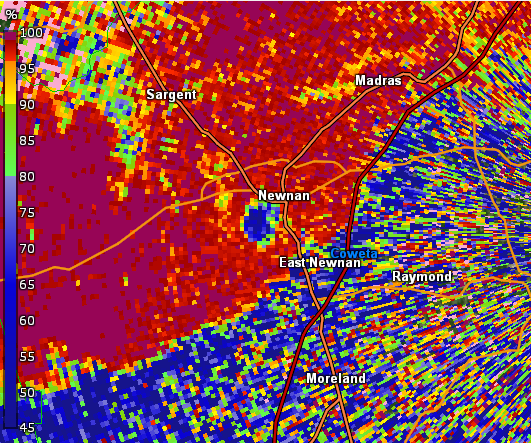
CC radar image of the EF4 Newnan tornado at peak intensity as it entered Newnan.

As the now very large tornado entered the western city limits of Newnan and impacted the Fairhaven and Woodrow Place subdivisions, it reached its peak strength at low-end EF4 intensity, completely leveling multiple large and newly built homes along Fairview Drive and Arlington Court, with some of them being partially swept away, although vehicles in garages were left untouched. There was also widespread EF2 to EF3 damage in nearby neighborhoods, with several homes partially or completely losing their roofs and outer walls, along with a wide swath of trees being snapped along this segment of the path. Along Smokey Road, the southern edge of the circulation produced EF2 damage to more homes, power poles, and a metal building. Another metal building sustained damage to its exterior, along with the Unity Baptist Church of Coweta. The tornado then weakened slightly, but remained at high-end EF3 intensity as it followed LaGrange Street to the east-northeast. A well-built, two-story brick apartment building sustained the most intense damage in this area, and had its roof ripped off with collapse of most walls on the top floor. Every building at Newnan High School was damaged, with low-end EF3 damage to one structure that had its roof removed and sustained partial collapse of a brick wall. The athletic facilities at the school were also badly damaged, and nearby homes sustained EF2 to EF3 damage, with loss of roofs and exterior walls noted. Many trees were downed throughout the area, and metal fence posts anchored in concrete were pulled out of the ground. The tornado then began to narrow and weakened somewhat but remained strong as it moved through the southern part of Downtown Newnan, producing mostly EF2 damage to structures. However, a small area of low-end EF3 damage occurred at the Downtown Church of Christ, which sustained roof and exterior wall loss along US 29/SR 14 (Greenville St). It also impacted the Justice Center, and caused extensive roof and window damage to an administrative building. Numerous homes and businesses were heavily damaged by tornadic winds and falling trees as well, while many power poles were snapped and power lines were downed. Trees were also blown down onto the Norfolk Southern and CSX rail lines. More trees were snapped on the east side of Downtown Newnan before the tornado continued through neighborhoods to the east, maintaining EF2 intensity. Numerous trees were snapped, and homes were damaged.

Velocity radar loop of the Newnan tornado traveling from Franklin to Newnan.

The tornado then weakened further to EF1 strength as it crossed Greison Trail, causing minor damage to homes and downing trees as it continued along the McIntosh Parkway. Maintaining EF1 strength, it then damaged the exterior of the Cancer Treatment Centers of America building as it crossed I-85 before entering another neighborhood east of the interstate, damaging and snapping more trees and causing minor damage to additional homes. The tornado then briefly regained low-end EF2 intensity one last time, snapping dozens of large trees in subdivisions along Shenandoah Boulevard, with some of the trees landing on homes. The tornado then weakened back to EF1 strength as it crossed the road before weakening further to EF0 strength as it moved through neighborhoods farther to the northeast. The tornado continued to cause tree damage as it approached and crossed over the intersection of GA 34 and SR 154. The tornado then briefly reached EF1 intensity one last time as several trees were snapped along Andrew Bailey Road and Holly Springs. Damage then became sporadic as the tornado moved into Fayette County, downing trees on another CSX rail line right before crossing SR 74. It caused additional minor EF0 damage on the north side of Peachtree City and Aberdeen, downing trees and blowing around light construction materials before dissipating at 12:30 a.m. EDT (04:30 UTC).

The tornado was on the ground for 53 minutes and traveled 38.56 miles (62.06 km) across three counties, reaching a maximum width of 1,850 yards (1,690 m) (just over 1 mile (1.6 km)) as it reached its peak intensity on the southwest side of Newnan. One person died as an indirect result of this tornado due to a heart attack he suffered while trying to reach his daughter's house in a heavily damaged neighborhood. First responders were unable to reach him in time due to the debris. It was the first EF4 tornado to occur in Georgia since the 2011 Ringgold-Apison tornado.

== Preparations and impact ==
On the morning of March 25, 2021, Alabama Governor Kay Ivey declared a state of emergency for 46 counties as the National Weather Service predicted a major severe weather outbreak and possible tornado outbreak.

On March 25, a large EF3 tornado in Ohatchee, Alabama killed six people and damaged at least 30–50 structures. The tornado outbreak also left over 35,000 customers in the state without electricity. Newnan High School in Newnan, Georgia suffered extensive damage to their campus from an overnight EF4 tornado and canceled school the following day.

== Non-tornadic effects ==
During the event there were 298 and 198 filtered reports of wind damage and large hail respectively. On March 27, there was widespread wind and hail damage recorded from Texas to North Carolina with 2 in (5.1 cm) hail being recorded as far east as Rose Hill, North Carolina. Across the Philadelphia metropolitan area on April 28, 60–70 mph (97–113 km/h) wind gusts blew down numerous trees and power lines resulting in numerous power outages. One person suffered minor injuries when a barn was blown over near Gap, Pennsylvania. New York City approached wind gusts of 50 mph (80 km/h) during record warm temperatures, resulting in both the Verrazzano–Narrows Bridge and Bayonne Bridge closing due to the high winds. High winds across the Northeast led to over 78,000 customers losing power. Flooding also closed portions of I-65 in Cullman County, Alabama.

=== Tennessee flooding ===
Along with the severe and tornadic weather, training thunderstorms also produced widespread flooding in Middle Tennessee on March 27–28, especially in Franklin and Nashville. Before the storm, a rare flash flood emergency was issued. Over 10 inches (250 mm) of rain was reported in Franklin while 7 inches (180 mm) of rain fell in Nashville and nearby Murfreesboro. This made it the highest single-day March rainfall on record, and the second-highest two-day rainfall event on record for Nashville. The Harpeth River reached major flood stage in Franklin, trapping people in their homes on Hillsboro Road. In Nashville, seven people were killed, and cars were trapped on I-24. The storms and tornadoes from March 25 left saturated ground, setting the stage for flooding after heavy rain all day on March 27. Damage due to the flooding totaled $28.021 million.

== See also ==
- Weather of 2021
- List of North American tornadoes and tornado outbreaks
- List of F4 and EF4 tornadoes
  - List of F4 and EF4 tornadoes (2020–present)
- List of Storm Prediction Center high risk days
- Tornado outbreak of March 16–18, 2021
