= Eagle Point, Alabama =

- Census-designated place
- Location within Alabama Location within the United States
- Coordinates: 33°23′05″N 86°40′46″W
- Country: United States
- State: Alabama
- County: Shelby

Area
  - Total: 2.25 sq mi (5.84 km^{2})
  - Land: 2.21 sq mi (5.72 km^{2})
  - Water: 0.042 sq mi (0.11 km^{2})
- Elevation: 666 ft (203 m)

Population (2020)
  - Total: 2,903
  - Density: 1,313.6/sq mi (507.19/km^{2})
- Time zone: UTC-6 (Central (CST))
  - Summer (DST): UTC-5 (CDT)
- ZIP code: 35242
- Area codes: 205, 659
- GNIS feature ID: 2805893
- FIPS code: 01-22088

Eagle Point is a census-designated place in Shelby County, Alabama, United States. It was first listed as a CDP prior to the 2020 census and is part of the Birmingham Metropolitan Area.

The area was struck by a long-tracked low-end EF3 tornado on March 25, 2021, damaging or destroying several homes and downing trees. Five people were injured by the tornado.

It was first named as a CDP in the 2020 Census which listed a population of 2,903.

== Geography ==
The community is in northern Shelby County. It is bordered to the north by the city of Birmingham, to the east by Highland Lakes, to the south by Pelham, and to the west by Meadowbrook.

According to the U.S. Census Bureau, the Eagle Point CDP has a total area of 2.2 square miles (5.8 km^{2}), of which 0.04 square miles (0.11 km^{2}), or 1.94%, are water.

== Demographics ==
Historical population
| Census | Pop. | Note | %± |
|---|---|---|---|
| 2020 | 2,903 | | — |
U.S. Decennial Census; 2020

=== 2020 census ===
As of the 2020 census, Eagle Point had a population of 2,903. The median age was 42.0 years. 25.3% of residents were under the age of 18 and 12.9% of residents were 65 years of age or older. For every 100 females there were 99.5 males, and for every 100 females age 18 and over there were 96.2 males age 18 and over.

97.3% of residents lived in urban areas, while 2.7% lived in rural areas.

There were 942 households in Eagle Point, of which 39.7% had children under the age of 18 living in them. Of all households, 77.3% were married-couple households, 6.7% were households with a male householder and no spouse or partner present, and 14.8% were households with a female householder and no spouse or partner present. About 11.1% of all households were made up of individuals and 7.3% had someone living alone who was 65 years of age or older.

There were 964 housing units, of which 2.3% were vacant. The homeowner vacancy rate was 0.3% and the rental vacancy rate was 29.4%.

Eagle Point CDP, Alabama – Racial and ethnic composition Note: the US Census treats Hispanic/Latino as an ethnic category. This table excludes Latinos from the racial categories and assigns them to a separate category. Hispanics/Latinos may be of any race.
| Race / Ethnicity (NH = Non-Hispanic) | Pop 2020 | 2020 |
|---|---|---|
| White alone (NH) | 2,452 | 84.46% |
| Black or African American alone (NH) | 111 | 3.82% |
| Native American or Alaska Native alone (NH) | 3 | 0.10% |
| Asian alone (NH) | 158 | 5.44% |
| Native Hawaiian or Pacific Islander alone (NH) | 0 | 0.00% |
| Other race alone (NH) | 8 | 0.28% |
| Mixed race or Multiracial (NH) | 95 | 3.27% |
| Hispanic or Latino (any race) | 76 | 2.62% |
| Total | 2,903 | 100.00% |
