= Ohatchee, Alabama =

- Town
- Location of Ohatchee in Calhoun County, Alabama.
- Coordinates: 33°46′30″N 86°01′40″W
- Country: United States
- State: Alabama
- County: Calhoun
- Established: 1956

Government
  - Type: Mayor-council government

Area
  - Total: 5.92 sq mi (15.34 km^{2})
  - Land: 5.88 sq mi (15.22 km^{2})
  - Water: 0.046 sq mi (0.12 km^{2})
- Elevation: 551 ft (168 m)

Population (2020)
  - Total: 1,157
  - Density: 196.9/sq mi (76.02/km^{2})
- Time zone: UTC-6 (Central (CST))
  - Summer (DST): UTC-5 (CDT)
- ZIP code: 36271
- Area code: 256
- FIPS code: 01-56472
- GNIS feature ID: 2407037
- Website: https://www.townofohatchee.com

Ohatchee (inc. 1956) is a town in Calhoun County, Alabama, United States. At the 2020 census, the population was 1,157. It is included in the Anniston–Oxford, Alabama Metropolitan Statistical Area.

== History ==
Andrew Jackson used the area around present-day Ohatchee to prepare for the Battle of Talladega. Lyncoya Jackson was orphaned by the Battle of Tallushatchee in November 1813 and later sent to Jackson's Hermitage in Tennessee where he was raised. Lyncoya died of tuberculosis in 1828.

The site of the battle is marked with a large stone marker along Alabama Highway 144 between Alexandria and Ohatchee, near Tallaseehatchee Creek.

Between 1863 and 1864, Alfred A. Janney built a furnace, now named Janney Furnace, to produce pig iron for the Confederate States of America during the Civil War. The furnace never went into production, but locals often speak of the quality of the construction because the structure was supposedly built by slaves. The site is now a part of the Calhoun County Park System and features a Civil War memorial alongside a Civil War and Native American museum.

Ohatchee became an incorporated town in 1956.

On March 25, 2021, an EF3 tornado struck the town, killing six residents.

== Geography ==
Ohatchee is located in western Calhoun County. The town center lies just north of the confluence of Tallaseehatchee Creek with Ohatchee Creek, a tributary of the Coosa River. A northwest extension of the town limits reaches to the shores of the Coosa River along Neely Henry Lake.

According to the U.S. Census Bureau, the town has a total area of 5.9 square miles (15.4 km^{2}), of which 5.9 square miles (15.3 km^{2}) is land and 0.039 square miles (0.1 km^{2}), or 0.69%, is water.

== Demographics ==
Historical population
Census	Pop.	Note	%±
1960	437		—
1970	445		1.8%
1980	860		93.3%
1990	1,042		21.2%
2000	1,215		16.6%
2010	1,170		−3.7%
2020	1,157		−1.1%
U.S. Decennial Census; 2013 Estimate

=== 2020 census ===
As of the 2020 census, Ohatchee had a population of 1,157. The median age was 48.5 years. 18.2% of residents were under the age of 18 and 25.2% were 65 years of age or older. For every 100 females, there were 104.4 males, and for every 100 females age 18 and over, there were 103.2 males age 18 and over.

0.0% of residents lived in urban areas, while 100.0% lived in rural areas.

There were 503 households in Ohatchee, of which 26.0% had children under the age of 18 living in them. Of all households, 51.5% were married-couple households, 22.3% were households with a male householder and no spouse or partner present, and 21.7% were households with a female householder and no spouse or partner present. About 27.0% of all households were made up of individuals, and 13.8% had someone living alone who was 65 years of age or older.

There were 578 housing units, of which 13.0% were vacant. The homeowner vacancy rate was 0.0% and the rental vacancy rate was 3.3%.

Ohatchee racial composition
Race	Num.	Perc.
White (non-Hispanic)	1,058	91.44%
Black or African American (non-Hispanic)	36	3.11%
Other/Mixed	47	4.06%
Hispanic or Latino	16	1.38%

=== 2010 census ===
As of the census of 2010, there were 1,170 people, 474 households, and 361 families residing in the town. The population density was 198 inhabitants per square mile (76/km^{2}). There were 571 housing units at an average density of 96.8 per square mile (37.4/km^{2}). The racial makeup of the town was 94.1% White, 3.2% Black or African American, 0.6% Native American, 0.0% Asian, and 2.1% from two or more races. 0.6% of the population were Hispanic or Latino of any race.

There were 474 households, out of which 25.5% had children under the age of 18 living with them, 61.8% were married couples living together, 9.9% had a female householder with no husband present, and 23.8% were non-families. 22.2% of all households were made up of individuals, and 8.3% had someone living alone who was 65 years of age or older. The average household size was 2.47 and the average family size was 2.84.

In the town, the age distribution of the population shows 21.1% under the age of 18, 7.1% from 18 to 24, 22.6% from 25 to 44, 35.0% from 45 to 64, and 14.1% who were 65 years of age or older. The median age was 44.4 years. For every 100 females, there were 105.3 males. For every 100 females age 18 and over, there were 99.0 males.

The median income for a household in the town was $55,769, and the median income for a family was $62,266. Males had a median income of $50,817 versus $26,563 for females. The per capita income for the town was $23,041. About 3.4% of families and 4.6% of the population were below the poverty line, including 1.6% of those under age 18 and 8.1% of those age 65 or over.

== Notable people ==
- Clyde Propst, American football coach
- Robert Bruce Propst, United States federal judge
- Rush Propst, American football coach
