= Spencer Johnson (American football) =

American football player (born 1981)

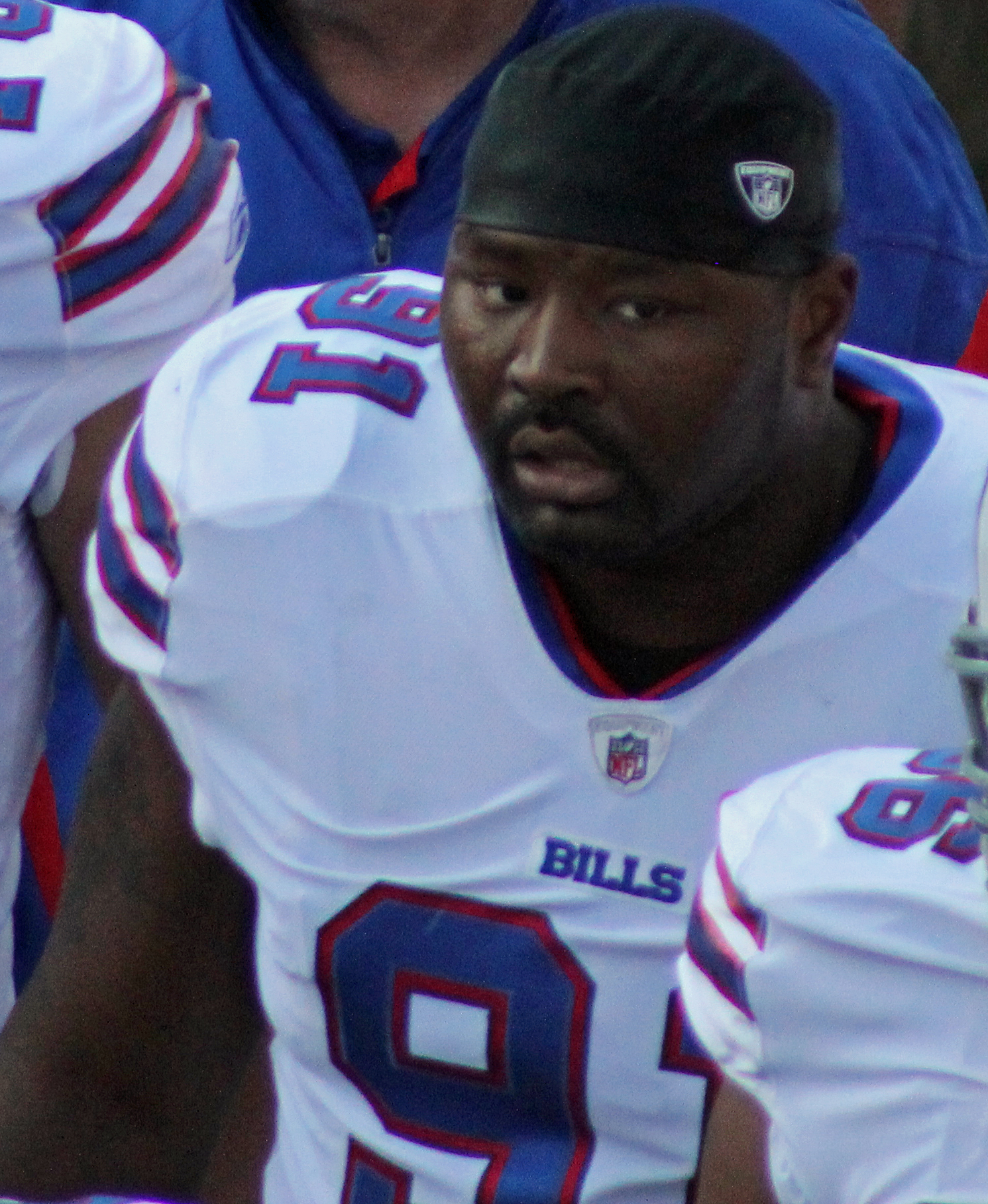
- Johnson in 2011

No. 97, 91
- Position: Defensive tackle

Personal information
- Born: December 12, 1981 (age 44); Waynesboro, Mississippi, U.S.
- Listed height: 6 ft 3 in (1.91 m)
- Listed weight: 304 lb (138 kg)

Career information
- High school: Silas (AL) Southern Choctaw
- College: Auburn
- NFL draft: 2004: undrafted

Career history
- Minnesota Vikings (2004−2007); Buffalo Bills (2008−2012)

Career NFL statistics
- Total tackles: 301
- Sacks: 14
- Forced fumbles: 4
- Fumble recoveries: 5
- Pass deflections: 13
- Defensive touchdowns: 1
- Stats at Pro Football Reference

Spencer Johnson (born December 12, 1981) is an American former professional football player who was a defensive tackle in the National Football League (NFL). He played college football for the Auburn Tigers and was signed by the Minnesota Vikings as an undrafted free agent in 2004.

== Early life ==
Johnson attended Southern Choctaw High School in Silas, Alabama. He was a letterman in both football and basketball. In football, he led his teams to the Alabama Class 2A State Championship in 1998 and 1999. In basketball, he was an All-State Honorable Mention selection. Johnson graduated from Southern Choctaw High School in 2000.

== Professional career ==
=== Minnesota Vikings ===
Johnson went undrafted in 2004, but subsequently signed with the Minnesota Vikings. He worked himself into the starting rotation by the seventh game of his rookie season and remained the starting defensive tackle until a knee injury ended his 2006 season on December 19.

=== Buffalo Bills ===
He signed with the Buffalo Bills as a free agent on March 1, 2008.

=== NFL statistics ===
Year	Team	GP	COMB	TOTAL	AST	SACK	FF	FR	FR YDS	INT	IR YDS	AVG IR	LNG	TD	PD
2004	MIN	9	40	29	11	1.0	0	0	0	0	0	0	0	0	1
2005	MIN	10	29	20	9	0.0	0	0	0	0	0	0	0	0	2
2006	MIN	14	15	11	4	0.0	0	0	0	0	0	0	0	0	0
2007	MIN	16	24	21	3	3.0	1	2	0	0	0	0	0	0	0
2008	BUF	16	31	21	10	2.0	0	0	0	0	0	0	0	0	3
2009	BUF	16	43	33	10	2.0	0	1	0	0	0	0	0	0	1
2010	BUF	14	55	41	14	2.0	1	1	0	0	0	0	0	0	3
2011	BUF	16	47	30	17	2.0	1	1	17	0	0	0	0	0	1
2012	BUF	14	19	10	9	2.0	1	0	0	0	0	0	0	0	2
Career		125	303	216	87	14.0	4	5	0	0	0	0	0	0	13
