= Macon, Alabama =

- Unincorporated community
- Location within Alabama Location within the United States
- Coordinates: 33°43′50″N 86°04′38″W
- Country: United States
- State: Alabama
- County: Calhoun
- Elevation: 505 ft (154 m)
- Time zone: UTC-6 (Central (CST))
  - Summer (DST): UTC-5 (CDT)
- Area codes: 256 & 938
- GNIS feature ID: 166222

Macon, also known as Macon Quarters, is an unincorporated community in Calhoun County, Alabama, United States.

== History ==
A post office operated under the name Macon from 1891 to 1903. Macon was named for the city in Georgia. The town was heavily damaged on March 25, 2021 when an EF3 tornado moved directly through it, damaging or destroying several homes, mobile homes, and trees.
