= Tornado outbreak of March 16–18, 2021 =

2021 tornado outbreak and blizzard in the United States

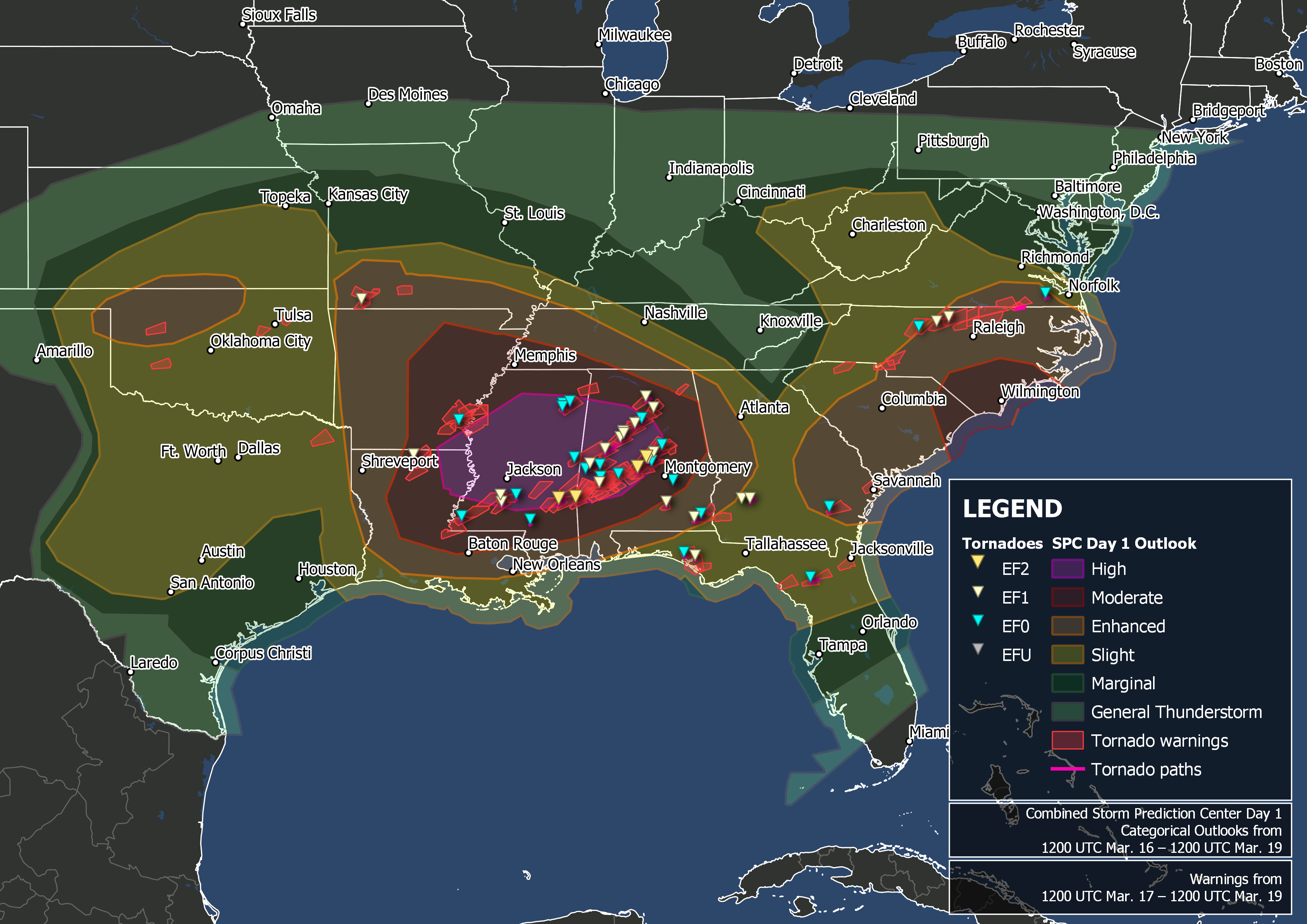
- Map of confirmed tornadoes and tornado warnings received by the Storm Prediction Center

Meteorological history
- Duration: March 16–18, 2021

Tornado outbreak
- Tornadoes: 51
- Max. rating: EF2 tornado
- Duration: 49 hours and 28 minutes
- Highest winds: Tornadic – 135 mph (217 km/h) in Wayne County, Mississippi on March 17; Non-tornadic – 85 mph (137 km/h) near Garysburg, North Carolina on March 18
- Largest hail: 2.75 in (7.0 cm) diameter in Gordo, Alabama on March 17
- Max. snowfall: Snow – 6.2 in (16 cm) at Borger, Texas

Overall effects
- Fatalities: 1 non-tornadic
- Injuries: 6 tornadic (Note: Fatality due to car crash in Mississippi; Injuries: 2 near Burnsville, Alabama, 2 near Morvin, Alabama, 1 near Gardendale, Alabama, and 1 near Dothan, Alabama)
- Damage: $500 million (2021 USD)
- Areas affected: Southeastern United States, Southern Plains
- Power outages: >103,000
- Part of the tornado outbreaks of 2021 and 2020–21 North American winter

A tornado outbreak occurred on Saint Patrick's Day in the Deep South. Mississippi and Alabama were greatly affected, and although numerous tornadoes were confirmed, none of them reached higher than EF2 strength. Six people were injured by four different tornadoes across Alabama during the outbreak. A non-tornadic fatality also occurred due to a car crash near Natchez, Mississippi. The outbreak began the day before, with a couple tornadoes in Mississippi, and continued over the next two days. The storm moved eastward and affected portions of Florida, Georgia, the Carolinas, and Virginia on March 18, spawning more tornadoes and causing wind damage before the storms pushed offshore that night. In total, 51 tornadoes were confirmed during the event, including 25 in Alabama, making it the sixth-largest tornado event in the state's history, and is sometimes locally referred to as the Saint Patrick's Day tornado outbreak of 2021. The same areas would be hit again by a more significant and destructive tornado outbreak sequence one week later.

The extratropical cyclone responsible for the tornado outbreak also resulted in a severe late-season blizzard in parts of the Southern Plains, particularly in the Texas and Oklahoma panhandles. Zero visibility was reported in much of the area for hours in a row on the morning of March 17, due to extremely heavy snowfall rates as well as wind gusts over 60 mph (97 km/h).

== Meteorological synopsis ==
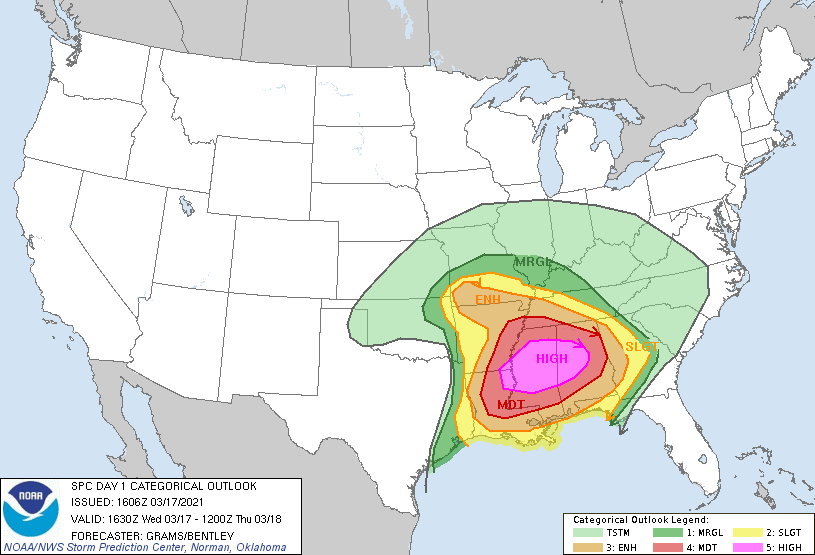
Storm Prediction Center (SPC) outlook issued at 11:30 a.m. CDT (16:30 UTC) on March 17

On March 16, an enhanced risk for severe weather was issued for northeastern Texas Panhandle northeastward into south central Kansas for the possibility of very large hail. Slight and marginal risk areas, however, covered a much larger area, covering most of the Southern Plains and eastward into Georgia. This included a large 5% tornado risk stretching from the eastern Texas Panhandle into western Mississippi Widespread strong to severe thunderstorms affected areas from Texas and Kansas to Alabama. In southern Mississippi, a cluster of storms bought wind, hail, and tornado damage to Copiah and Simpson Counties. Another cluster of supercells and multi-cell clusters formed in the Texas Panhandle and moved northeastward through western and northern Oklahoma. A tornado was reported on the south side of Hobart, although it was later determined to be a gustnado instead. As the night progressed, a squall line developed in Western Texas and steadily organized as it moved eastward overnight producing more severe weather.

The main day of the outbreak was March 17. It was forecasted well in advance; on March 13, the Storm Prediction Center highlighted a large area of severe potential, including all of Mississippi. By March 14, the entire state and the surrounding areas were contained within a 30% risk contour. Two days later, the SPC upgraded portions of Arkansas, Mississippi, Tennessee, and Alabama to a Moderate risk for severe weather, including a 15% risk area for tornadoes. Early on March 17, the SPC issued a high risk, the first such outlook in two years, for portions of Mississippi, Alabama, and Louisiana. By 12:30 p.m CDT, the high risk area included a 45% risk area for tornadoes across a small portion of the Mississippi–Alabama state line.

Throughout the day, the Storm Prediction Center issued three particularly dangerous situation (PDS) tornado watches for areas of Alabama and Mississippi. These included much of central Alabama and Mississippi at 11:35 a.m. CDT; northern Louisiana, many of the remaining counties in Mississippi, and a handful of counties in Arkansas at 11:55 a.m. CDT; and then a second PDS watch for eastern Mississippi and much of Alabama at 6:45 p.m. CDT. There were 10 other tornado watches issued throughout the day as well.

The first tornado of the day, rated EF2, touched down west of Waynesboro, Mississippi just after 12:00 p.m. CDT on March 17, causing major damage to chicken houses and trees. In the Burnsville, Alabama, area another strong EF2 tornado destroyed multiple mobile homes, heavily damaged a frame home, and injured two people. The strongest tornado of the day was a high-end EF2 tornado that damaged or destroyed multiple homes and mobile homes, and also tossed vehicles near Billingsley, Alabama. Another EF2 tornado struck Silas, snapping numerous trees in and around town. Despite the high potential for long-tracked and violent tornadoes, the four EF2 tornadoes were the only strong (EF2+) tornadoes that were confirmed. In all, 33 tornadoes were confirmed that day.

More severe and tornadic weather was expected on March 18 along the Atlantic coast from Florida to Southern Maryland and a moderate risk was issued from eastern Georgia to north central North Carolina on March 17. The moderate risk was downgraded to enhanced on March 18 due to a lack of buoyancy in the atmosphere, but numerous strong to severe thunderstorms still tracked through the area during the afternoon. Dozens of weak tornadoes were confirmed before the storms moved offshore that evening.

== Confirmed tornadoes ==
Confirmed tornadoes by Enhanced Fujita rating
| EFU | EF0 | EF1 | EF2 | EF3 | EF4 | EF5 | Total |
|---|---|---|---|---|---|---|---|
| 0 | 24 | 23 | 4 | 0 | 0 | 0 | 51 |

=== March 16 event ===
List of confirmed tornadoes – Tuesday, March 16, 2021 (Note: All dates are based on the local time zone where the tornado touched down; however, all times are in Coordinated Universal Time for consistency.)
| EF# | Location | County / Parish | State | Start Coord. | Time (UTC) | Path length | Max width |
|---|---|---|---|---|---|---|---|
| EF1 | N of Sand Hill | Copiah | MS | 31.7611°N 90.3494°W | 00:03–00:06 | 1.39 mi (2.24 km) | 100 yd (91 m) |
| EF1 | Trees were snapped or uprooted, large tree branches were broken off, and a few power lines were downed. | | | | | | |
| EF0 | NNE of New Hebron | Simpson | MS | 31.7748°N 89.9611°W | 00:58–00:59 | 0.52 mi (0.84 km) | 50 yd (46 m) |
| EF0 | A house and barn sustained minor roof damage, and a few trees were downed. | | | | | | |

=== March 17 event ===
List of confirmed tornadoes – Wednesday, March 17, 2021
| EF# | Location | County / Parish | State | Start Coord. | Time (UTC) | Path length | Max width |
|---|---|---|---|---|---|---|---|
| EF2 | N of Strengthford to NW of Waynesboro | Wayne | MS | 31.6491°N 88.9066°W | 17:03–17:22 | 13.1 mi (21.1 km) | 325 yd (297 m) |
| EF2 | Several chicken houses were destroyed, a mobile home sustained roof damage, and many trees were downed, including numerous large pine trees. In November 2023, this tornado was reanalyzed and had its track receive cosmetic updates based on Worldview satellite imagery. | | | | | | |
| EF0 | Intercourse | Sumter | AL | 32.4134°N 88.2421°W | 17:31–17:32 | 0.35 mi (0.56 km) | 70 yd (64 m) |
| EF0 | A brief tornado ripped shingles from a home, uprooted trees, and snapped large tree limbs. | | | | | | |
| EF2 | E of Selma to Burnsville | Dallas | AL | 32.4240°N 86.9542°W | 17:32–17:45 | 5.08 mi (8.18 km) | 1,000 yd (910 m) |
| EF2 | Most of the damage associated with this low-end EF2 tornado occurred in the Burnsville area. A well built home sustained loss of its carport, roof damage, broken windows, and partial loss of one wall. An unanchored manufactured home was completely destroyed, with remnants blown across a road and scattered over 100 yards (91 m), and a vehicle at this residence was rolled and damaged. A second manufactured home with some anchors was rolled and blown apart, with two people inside sustaining minor injuries. Several more homes sustained roof damage, and a two-story home sustained structural damage both from wind and from falling trees. Many trees and several power lines were downed along the path. | | | | | | |
| EF1 | SE of Livingston to SE of Epes | Sumter | AL | 32.5390°N 88.1341°W | 17:57–18:15 | 9.78 mi (15.74 km) | 475 yd (434 m) |
| EF1 | A mobile home was shifted from its blocks, outbuildings were destroyed, and several structures sustained roof damage. Numerous trees were snapped or uprooted. | | | | | | |
| EF1 | NE of Brookhaven | Lincoln | MS | 31.5903°N 90.3218°W | 18:16–18:27 | 6.16 mi (9.91 km) | 120 yd (110 m) |
| EF1 | One house lost half its roof, a couple mobile homes had the skirting blown off, and several sheds were damaged. Many trees were downed along the path. | | | | | | |
| EF1 | ENE of Billingsley | Autauga | AL | 32.6621°N 86.6920°W | 18:24–18:27 | 2.87 mi (4.62 km) | 150 yd (140 m) |
| EF1 | One home sustained minor roof damage, and numerous trees were downed, a few of which caused roof and porch damage to a second home. | | | | | | |
| EF1 | E of Clanton | Chilton | AL | 32.8165°N 86.5539°W | 18:56–19:03 | 3.04 mi (4.89 km) | 500 yd (460 m) |
| EF1 | Farm buildings and an outbuilding were damaged, and several trees were downed. | | | | | | |
| EF0 | W of Demopolis | Marengo | AL | 32.5117°N 87.8866°W | 19:03–19:05 | 0.83 mi (1.34 km) | 175 yd (160 m) |
| EF0 | A couple of buildings sustained minor damage, and several trees were downed. | | | | | | |
| EF1 | NNW of Akron to E of Stokes | Hale, Tuscaloosa | AL | 32.9081°N 87.7584°W | 19:12–19:55 | 22.03 mi (35.45 km) | 550 yd (500 m) |
| EF1 | Numerous homes and other structures, including a post office, an apartment building, and a church, were damaged in Moundville. To the south and southeast of Tuscaloosa, a few mobile homes were destroyed and campers were flipped. Many trees were downed along the path. | | | | | | |
| EF1 | SW of Sweet Water | Marengo | AL | 32.0678°N 87.9015°W | 19:22–19:27 | 2.77 mi (4.46 km) | 500 yd (460 m) |
| EF1 | Numerous trees were snapped along the path. | | | | | | |
| EF1 | W of Farmerville | Union | LA | 32.7643°N 92.4998°W | 19:26–19:33 | 2.64 mi (4.25 km) | 766 yd (700 m) |
| EF1 | A chicken house and a picnic pavilion were damaged, and many trees were snapped or uprooted, especially as the tornado moved through Lake D'Arbonne State Park. Several trees fell on homes and vehicles. | | | | | | |
| EF0 | Unity | Coosa | AL | 33.0063°N 86.3522°W | 19:29–19:31 | 0.13 mi (0.21 km) | 25 yd (23 m) |
| EF0 | A brief tornado uprooted a pine tree and snapped several tree branches in the rural community of Unity. | | | | | | |
| EF1 | NW of Coaling | Tuscaloosa | AL | 33.1907°N 87.3795°W | 20:09–20:11 | 0.53 mi (0.85 km) | 150 yd (140 m) |
| EF1 | This tornado produced damage around Lake Wildwood, consisting of downed trees and minor structural damage. | | | | | | |
| EF1 | NNE of Brookwood | Tuscaloosa | AL | 33.2887°N 87.2997°W | 20:25–20:34 | 3.51 mi (5.65 km) | 650 yd (590 m) |
| EF1 | The same supercell responsible for producing the Moundville and Lake Wildwood tornadoes produced a third tornado, which damaged a metal warehouse, with roofing and siding being thrown. Antennas were bent on a communications tower, and many trees were downed as well. | | | | | | |
| EF2 | E of Waynesboro, MS to ESE of Putnam, AL | Wayne (MS), Choctaw (AL), Clarke (AL), Marengo (AL) | MS, AL | 31.6842°N 88.4855°W | 20:44–21:40 | 36.59 mi (58.89 km) | 500 yd (460 m) |
| EF2 | The tornado quickly moved into Alabama after touching down just west of the Mississippi state line, where damage was limited to downed trees. In Choctaw County, several chicken houses were severely damaged, and many softwood and hardwood trees were snapped or uprooted. The tornado then struck Silas, where trees were downed, and outbuildings and homes sustained minor damage. The tornado reached peak intensity as it approached the Tombigbee River and crossed into Clarke County, where a large swath of significant tree damage occurred. Some river camp homes in the area sustained roof damage, mobile homes were damaged, and an older, site-built home was heavily damaged, with two people inside being injured. The tornado weakened and continued into Marengo County, where it snapped and uprooted numerous trees as it crossed SR 69 before dissipating. In November 2023, this tornado was reanalyzed and had its track receive cosmetic updates based on Planet satellite imagery. | | | | | | |
| EF1 | Kellerman to SW of Oak Grove | Tuscaloosa, Jefferson | AL | 33.3369°N 87.3097°W | 20:54–21:06 | 5.81 mi (9.35 km) | 650 yd (590 m) |
| EF1 | Numerous trees were snapped or uprooted by this high-end EF1 tornado. The tornado dissipated just after crossing the county line. | | | | | | |
| EF0 | W of Safford | Dallas | AL | 32.2850°N 87.4280°W | 21:11–21:13 | 1.07 mi (1.72 km) | 75 yd (69 m) |
| EF0 | Trees and tree branches were downed. | | | | | | |
| EF1 | Maytown | Jefferson | AL | 33.5371°N 87.0217°W | 21:30–21:38 | 2.77 mi (4.46 km) | 650 yd (590 m) |
| EF1 | Structures sustained minor damage in the town of Maytown, and several trees were snapped or uprooted as well. | | | | | | |
| EF0 | SE of McGehee | Desha | AR | 33.6201°N 91.3797°W | 21:37–21:38 | 0.1 mi (0.16 km) | 10 yd (9.1 m) |
| EF0 | The brief tornado touched down in an empty farm field causing no damage. The tornado was rated based on radar data, video from a storm chaser, and photographs. | | | | | | |
| EF0 | Sweet Water | Marengo | AL | 32.0921°N 87.8699°W | 21:54–21:58 | 1.75 mi (2.82 km) | 75 yd (69 m) |
| EF0 | Large tree branches were snapped in Sweet Water. | | | | | | |
| EF0 | NNW of Gardendale | Jefferson | AL | 33.6619°N 86.8534°W | 21:56–22:04 | 3.46 mi (5.57 km) | 660 yd (600 m) |
| EF0 | Numerous trees were downed, some of which caused minor damage to homes and vehicles. One person was injured. | | | | | | |
| EF0 | SSE of Doloroso | Wilkinson | MS | 31.2330°N 91.3113°W | 22:06–22:07 | 0.84 mi (1.35 km) | 100 yd (91 m) |
| EF0 | Trees were damaged and uprooted, with large branches broken. | | | | | | |
| EF2 | N of Billingsley | Chilton | AL | 32.6746°N 86.7364°W | 22:12–22:23 | 5.84 mi (9.40 km) | 400 yd (370 m) |
| EF2 | A high-end EF2 tornado struck just south of Pools Crossroads, where an unanchored home was shifted off its foundation, a double-wide mobile home and a large outbuilding were completely destroyed, some exterior walls of a brick house were collapsed, and outbuildings were damaged. Additionally, another home sustained roof damage, a vehicle was moved 15 feet (4.6 m), and many trees were snapped or uprooted. | | | | | | |
| EF1 | SE of Cassville to ESE of Crane | Barry, Stone | MO | 36.6°N 93.82°W | 22:30–23:30 | 23.73 mi (38.19 km) | 75 yd (69 m) |
| EF1 | Shingles were removed from a mobile home, outbuildings were destroyed, and many trees were downed along an intermittent path. | | | | | | |
| EF1 | SW of Rosa to S of Susan Moore | Blount | AL | 33.9227°N 86.5587°W | 22:43–23:05 | 12.89 mi (20.74 km) | 300 yd (270 m) |
| EF1 | An outbuilding was destroyed, a porch was blown off a mobile home, and many trees were snapped and uprooted. | | | | | | |
| EF0 | W of Purvis | Lamar | MS | 31.1532°N 89.6130°W | 23:16–23:17 | 1.42 mi (2.29 km) | 300 yd (270 m) |
| EF0 | A house lost most of its roof, a couple sheds were destroyed, and several trees were downed, one of which fell through a mobile home. | | | | | | |
| EF0 | SW of Okolona | Chickasaw | MS | 33.9519°N 88.8160°W | 00:25–00:26 | 0.5 mi (0.80 km) | 50 yd (46 m) |
| EF0 | A barn sustained roof damage, and several trees were downed. | | | | | | |
| EF0 | NW of Okolona | Chickasaw | MS | 34.0296°N 88.8041°W | 00:31–00:34 | 1.36 mi (2.19 km) | 100 yd (91 m) |
| EF0 | An outbuilding was destroyed and several trees were downed. | | | | | | |
| EF0 | Nettleton | Monroe, Lee | MS | 34.0783°N 88.6295°W | 00:39–00:47 | 4.86 mi (7.82 km) | 60 yd (55 m) |
| EF0 | A structure sustained roof damage, and several trees were downed along an intermittent path from Nettleton to northeast of town. | | | | | | |
| EF0 | W of Porterville | Kemper | MS | 32.689°N 88.5223°W | 00:56–00:57 | 0.24 mi (0.39 km) | 80 yd (73 m) |
| EF0 | Trees were uprooted and tree branches were broken. | | | | | | |
| EF0 | WSW of Oak Grove | Autauga | AL | 32.6004°N 86.6099°W | 01:35–01:36 | 0.13 mi (0.21 km) | 75 yd (69 m) |
| EF0 | A brief tornado destroyed a metal outbuilding. A carport was lofted, landing in an open field. Trees and tree branches were snapped. | | | | | | |
| EF1 | SW of Fairview to NW of Baileyton | Cullman | AL | 34.1997°N 86.7521°W | 02:31–02:43 | 8.47 mi (13.63 km) | 150 yd (140 m) |
| EF1 | Several sheds were either damaged or destroyed, a garage was severely damaged, several large farm sheds were demolished, and two houses sustained partial roof loss. Additionally, several chicken houses had roofing and siding removed, large outbuildings sustained roof damage, and numerous trees were downed. | | | | | | |
| EF0 | NNW of Pine Level | Montgomery | AL | 32.1279°N 86.0797°W | 03:43–03:44 | 0.3 mi (0.48 km) | 140 yd (130 m) |
| EF0 | A farmhouse sustained roof damage, both from wind and from a falling tree. A playhouse and a trampoline were destroyed, a fence sustained minor damage, and several trees were snapped or uprooted. | | | | | | |

=== March 18 event ===
List of confirmed tornadoes – Thursday, March 18, 2021
| EF# | Location | County / Parish | State | Start Coord. | Time (UTC) | Path length | Max width |
|---|---|---|---|---|---|---|---|
| EF1 | NE of Brantley | Crenshaw | AL | 31.5920°N 86.2435°W | 09:08–09:10 | 0.52 mi (0.84 km) | 150 yd (140 m) |
| EF1 | Numerous trees were downed, and the roof was removed from an outbuilding. | | | | | | |
| EF1 | W of Dothan | Houston | AL | 31.2125°N 85.5527°W | 10:27–10:37 | 5.24 mi (8.43 km) | 150 yd (140 m) |
| EF1 | A double-wide mobile home sustained significant roof loss, a large carport over an RV was completely destroyed, and an outbuilding lost most of its roof and had some walls partially collapsed. Several farm structures sustained mostly roof damage, two homes sustained roof damage, and one had partial roof loss on the second story. A boat and trailer were picked up and rolled/rotated 180 degrees, being left 75–100 yards (69–91 m) away. Numerous trees were downed along the path, and one person was injured. | | | | | | |
| EF0 | NW of Kinsey | Houston, Henry | AL | 31.3047°N 85.3825°W | 10:49–10:52 | 2.08 mi (3.35 km) | 50 yd (46 m) |
| EF0 | A carport was damaged, and small trees and limbs were snapped. | | | | | | |
| EF0 | ENE of Ebro | Washington | FL | 30.47°N 85.81°W | 11:02–11:04 | 1.56 mi (2.51 km) | 25 yd (23 m) |
| EF0 | A TDS appeared on radar in a forested area. Tree damage was found, but no structural damage was reported. | | | | | | |
| EF0 | Northwest Florida Beaches International Airport | Bay | FL | 30.3373°N 85.8082°W | 11:03–11:04 | 3.94 mi (6.34 km) | 100 yd (91 m) |
| EF0 | Buildings sustained minor damage at the airport, and trees were downed. | | | | | | |
| EF1 | Bayou George | Bay | FL | 30.2631°N 85.5294°W | 11:25–11:26 | 0.37 mi (0.60 km) | 50 yd (46 m) |
| EF1 | Several homes were damaged in Bayou George, and trees were downed. | | | | | | |
| EF0 | E of Blakely | Early | GA | 31.36°N 84.88°W | 11:44–11:50 | 3.14 mi (5.05 km) | 50 yd (46 m) |
| EF0 | A TDS appeared on radar in a forested area. Tree damage was found, but no structural damage was reported. | | | | | | |
| EF0 | ENE of Woods | Liberty | FL | 30.36°N 84.9°W | 12:40 | 0.01 mi (0.016 km) | 25 yd (23 m) |
| EF0 | A brief TDS appeared on radar in a forested area. Tree damage was found, but no structural damage was reported. | | | | | | |
| EF1 | S of Sasser | Terrell | GA | 31.6743°N 84.3793°W | 12:49–12:52 | 3.99 mi (6.42 km) | 200 yd (180 m) |
| EF1 | A house sustained roof damage, and numerous trees were snapped or uprooted. | | | | | | |
| EF1 | S of Leesburg to W of Oakfield | Lee | GA | 31.6791°N 84.172°W | 13:06–13:17 | 10.42 mi (16.77 km) | 50 yd (46 m) |
| EF1 | Over half the roof was removed from a home and an attached carport was ripped off and thrown several feet. A shed was destroyed, the wall of a large garage was bowed outward, and a trampoline was tossed a short distance. Many trees were snapped or uprooted, including several large pines and a large oak that fell on another home. | | | | | | |
| EF0 | N of Bristol | Pierce | GA | 31.4715°N 82.2066°W | 17:38–17:40 | 0.1 mi (0.16 km) | 5 yd (4.6 m) |
| EF0 | A brief tornado spotted by emergency management downed four trees. | | | | | | |
| EF0 | NW of Trenton to Alachua | Gilchrist, Alachua | FL | 29.7254°N 82.6750°W | 18:46–19:05 | 12.5 mi (20.1 km) | 100 yd (91 m) |
| EF0 | A barn collapsed onto a tractor near the beginning of the path. A carport sustained roof damage in Alachua and multiple trees were downed, including one that fell on a car. | | | | | | |
| EF1 | NNW of Archdale | Guilford | NC | 35.93°N 79.99°W | 21:01–21:10 | 2.63 mi (4.23 km) | 500 yd (460 m) |
| EF1 | Numerous homes and businesses sustained minor to moderate damage, and trees were downed. | | | | | | |
| EF1 | Whitsett to S of Elon | Guilford, Alamance | NC | 36.0629°N 79.5485°W | 21:38–21:44 | 2.52 mi (4.06 km) | 200 yd (180 m) |
| EF1 | The roofs were blown off multiple houses. Numerous trees and power lines were downed. | | | | | | |
| EF1 | SW of Carr to NW of McDade | Orange | NC | 36.17°N 79.249°W | 22:04–22:10 | 4.25 mi (6.84 km) | 200 yd (180 m) |
| EF1 | Numerous trees and power lines were downed. The roof was blown off a house. | | | | | | |
| EF0 | Walters | Isle of Wight | VA | 36.7597°N 76.8566°W | 01:27–01:31 | 4.18 mi (6.73 km) | 150 yd (140 m) |
| EF0 | A pole barn was knocked down, a garage was destroyed, a house sustained roof damage, and a church lost most of its roof. Trees and tree limbs were downed along the path. | | | | | | |

== Impact ==
=== Southeastern United States ===
More than 40,000 homes and businesses were without electricity across Louisiana, Alabama and Mississippi. Two people were injured when a home was destroyed in Clarke County, Alabama. Four other homes were also destroyed, and some chicken farms. A car crash in Mississippi along U.S. Highway 61 resulted in a non-tornadic fatality.

In Mississippi's largest city of Jackson, ABC station WAPT was knocked off the air due to a 2-hour power outage caused by lightning, that caused alarm systems to go off in the studio.

=== Southern Plains ===
In parts of the Southern Plains, the large extratropical cyclone associated with the tornado outbreak also resulted in a severe blizzard early on March 17. Blizzard Warnings were issued across most of the Texas and Oklahoma panhandles, including the Amarillo area, late on March 16. Zero visibility was reported in much of the area under a Blizzard Warning. Extremely heavy snowfall rates and wind gusts of over 60 mph (97 km/h) resulted in long-duration blizzard conditions as well. Numerous crashes occurred on major roadways, and several highways, including I-40 and US-287 had to be closed. Amarillo, Texas saw almost 6 inches (15 cm) of snow, and nearby areas saw even more. The blizzard was also followed by a flash freeze overnight on March 17, resulting in a freeze-up of snow-covered roadways and more crashes overnight.

== See also ==
- List of North American tornadoes and tornado outbreaks
- List of Storm Prediction Center high risk days
- April 2016 North American storm complex
- Tornado outbreak and blizzard of April 13–15, 2018
- Tornado outbreak sequence of March 24–28, 2021
