= Silas, Alabama =

- Town
- Location of Silas in Choctaw County, Alabama.
- Coordinates: 31°46′18″N 88°19′52″W
- Country: United States
- State: Alabama
- County: Choctaw

Area
  - Total: 5.21 sq mi (13.49 km^{2})
  - Land: 5.21 sq mi (13.49 km^{2})
  - Water: 0 sq mi (0.00 km^{2})
- Elevation: 236 ft (72 m)

Population (2020)
  - Total: 377
  - Density: 72.4/sq mi (27.96/km^{2})
- Time zone: UTC-6 (Central (CST))
  - Summer (DST): UTC-5 (CDT)
- ZIP code: 36919
- Area code: 251
- FIPS code: 01-70416
- GNIS feature ID: 2407336
- Website: www.silasal.com

Silas is a town in Choctaw County, Alabama, United States. At the 2020 census, the population was 377.

The town was struck by a tornado on March 17, 2021. The tornado downed trees and inflicted minor damage to outbuildings and homes at EF1 strength. It reached EF2 strength well northeast of town and injured two people.

== Geography ==
Silas is located in southern Choctaw County next to U.S. Route 84 near the Mississippi state line.

According to the U.S. Census Bureau, the town has a total area of 5.2 square miles (13.5 km^{2}), all land.

== Demographics ==
Historical population
Census	Pop.	Note	%±
1950	383		—
1960	353		−7.8%
1970	345		−2.3%
1980	343		−0.6%
1990	245		−28.6%
2000	529		115.9%
2010	452		−14.6%
2020	377		−16.6%
U.S. Decennial Census; 2013 Estimate

As of the census of 2000, there were 529 people, 220 households, and 157 families residing in the town. The population density was 100.8 inhabitants per square mile (38.9/km^{2}). There were 260 housing units at an average density of 49.5 per square mile (19.1/km^{2}). The racial makeup of the town was 71.83% White, 25.71% Black or African American, 0.19% from other races, and 2.27% from two or more races. 0.19% of the population were Hispanic or Latino of any race.

There were 220 households, out of which 29.5% had children under the age of 18 living with them, 55.9% were married couples living together, 15.0% had a female householder with no husband present, and 28.6% were non-families. 27.7% of all households were made up of individuals, and 8.6% had someone living alone who was 65 years of age or older. The average household size was 2.40 and the average family size was 2.94.

In the town, the population was spread out, with 26.3% under the age of 18, 6.2% from 18 to 24, 28.0% from 25 to 44, 25.0% from 45 to 64, and 14.6% who were 65 years of age or older. The median age was 38 years. For every 100 females, there were 88.3 males. For every 100 females age 18 and over, there were 86.6 males.

The median income for a household in the town was $20,882, and the median income for a family was $25,833. Males had a median income of $27,955 versus $18,500 for females. The per capita income for the town was $14,074. About 16.5% of families and 19.0% of the population were below the poverty line, including 27.1% of those under age 18 and 11.6% of those age 65 or over.

== Notable people ==
- Jeff Branson, Major League Baseball coach and former player; attended Southern Choctaw High School
- Spencer Johnson, NFL defensive tackle, attended Southern Choctaw High School
- Travis Pearson, football player
