= Pleasant Gap, Alabama =

Pleasant Gap
- Unincorporated community
- Location in Alabama.
- Coordinates: 33°59′15″N 85°31′12″W
- Country: United States
- State: Alabama
- County: Cherokee
- Elevation: 689 ft (210 m)
- Time zone: UTC-6 (Central (CST))
  - Summer (DST): UTC-5 (CDT)
- Area codes: 256 & 938
- GNIS feature ID: 160400

Pleasant Gap, also known as Pleasantsgap and Stocks Mills, is an unincorporated community in Cherokee County, in the U.S. state of Alabama.

== History ==
A post office called Pleasant Gap was established in 1847, and remained in operation until it was discontinued in 1932. The community was named from a nearby gap at Frog Mountain.

== Demographics ==
Historical population
Census	Pop.	Note	%±
1880	120		—
U.S. Decennial Census
