= Meadowbrook, Alabama =

- Census-designated place (CDP) and Unincorporated community
- Location in Shelby County and the state of Alabama
- Coordinates: 33°23′16″N 86°42′29″W
- Country: United States
- State: Alabama
- County: Shelby

Area
  - Total: 4.37 sq mi (11.32 km^{2})
  - Land: 4.36 sq mi (11.29 km^{2})
  - Water: 0.012 sq mi (0.03 km^{2})
- Elevation: 630 ft (190 m)

Population (2020)
  - Total: 9,688
  - Density: 2,222.7/sq mi (858.17/km^{2})
- Time zone: UTC-6 (Central (CST))
  - Summer (DST): UTC-5 (CDT)
- ZIP code: 35242
- Area codes: 205 and 659
- FIPS code: 01-47740
- GNIS feature ID: 2403273

Meadowbrook is an unincorporated community and census-designated place (CDP) in Shelby County, Alabama, United States. At the 2020 census, the population was 9,688. It is part of the Birmingham metropolitan area.

== Geography ==
The community is located within the southeastern suburbs of Birmingham, generally bounded by U.S. Route 280 to the north, Alabama State Route 119 to the east, Valleydale Rd to the west, and Meadow Brook Rd to the south. Downtown Birmingham is 13 mi (21 km) to the northwest via US 280.

According to the U.S. Census Bureau, the community has a total area of 4.2 square miles (11 km^{2}), all land.

== Demographics ==
Historical population
Census	Pop.	Note	%±
1990	4,621		—
2000	4,697		1.6%
2010	8,769		86.7%
2020	9,688		10.5%

=== Racial and ethnic composition ===
Meadowbrook CDP, Alabama – Racial and ethnic composition Note: the US Census treats Hispanic/Latino as an ethnic category. This table excludes Latinos from the racial categories and assigns them to a separate category. Hispanics/Latinos may be of any race.
Race / Ethnicity (NH = Non-Hispanic)	Pop 2000	Pop 2010	Pop 2020	% 2000	% 2010	% 2020
White alone (NH)	4,407	8,029	8,018	93.83%	91.56%	82.76%
Black or African American alone (NH)	135	342	652	2.87%	3.90%	6.73%
Native American or Alaska Native alone (NH)	1	8	17	0.02%	0.09%	0.18%
Asian alone (NH)	98	184	293	2.09%	2.10%	3.02%
Native Hawaiian or Pacific Islander alone (NH)	0	2	4	0.00%	0.02%	0.04%
Other race alone (NH)	0	1	36	0.00%	0.01%	0.37%
Mixed race or Multiracial (NH)	25	65	400	0.53%	0.74%	4.13%
Hispanic or Latino (any race)	31	138	268	0.66%	1.57%	2.77%
Total	4,697	8,769	9,688	100.00%	100.00%	100.00%

=== 2020 census ===
As of the 2020 census, Meadowbrook had a population of 9,688. The median age was 39.9 years. 23.6% of residents were under the age of 18 and 14.7% of residents were 65 years of age or older. For every 100 females there were 97.1 males, and for every 100 females age 18 and over there were 94.5 males age 18 and over.

99.8% of residents lived in urban areas, while 0.2% lived in rural areas.

There were 3,613 households in Meadowbrook, of which 33.4% had children under the age of 18 living in them. Of all households, 63.5% were married-couple households, 14.3% were households with a male householder and no spouse or partner present, and 18.7% were households with a female householder and no spouse or partner present. About 21.2% of all households were made up of individuals and 6.5% had someone living alone who was 65 years of age or older.

There were 3,762 housing units, of which 4.0% were vacant. The homeowner vacancy rate was 0.9% and the rental vacancy rate was 9.1%.

=== 2010 census ===
At the 2010 census there were 8,769 people, 3,187 households, and 2,523 families living in the community. The population density was 2,100 inhabitants per square mile (810/km^{2}). There were 3,325 housing units at an average density of 791.7 per square mile (305.7/km^{2}). The racial makeup of the community was 92.8% White, 3.9% Black or African American, 0.1% Native American, 2.1% Asian, 0.3% from other races, and 0.8% from two or more races. 1.6% of the population were Hispanic or Latino of any race. Of the 3,187 households 40.2% had children under the age of 18 living with them, 69.2% were married couples living together, 7.8% had a female householder with no husband present, and 20.8% were non-families. 17.7% of households were one person and 3.1% were one person aged 65 or older. The average household size was 2.75 and the average family size was 3.15.

The age distribution was 27.5% under the age of 18, 6.7% from 18 to 24, 23.2% from 25 to 44, 34.6% from 45 to 64, and 8.1% 65 or older. The median age was 40.3 years. For every 100 females, there were 97.6 males. For every 100 females age 18 and over, there were 91.5 males.

The median household income was $98,862 and the median family income was $103,602. Males had a median income of $83,039 versus $52,460 for females. The per capita income for the community was $40,393. About 1.3% of families and 1.4% of the population were below the poverty line, including 1.2% of those under age 18 and 0% of those age 65 or over.

=== 2000 census ===
At the 2000 census there were 4,697 people, 1,659 households, and 1,373 families living in the community. The population density was 1,909.9 inhabitants per square mile (737.4/km^{2}). There were 1,695 housing units at an average density of 689.2 per square mile (266.1/km^{2}). The racial makeup of the community was 94.29% White, 2.87% Black or African American, 0.04% Native American, 2.09% Asian, 0.06% from other races, and 0.64% from two or more races. 0.66% of the population were Hispanic or Latino of any race. Of the 1,659 households 46.7% had children under the age of 18 living with them, 74.6% were married couples living together, 6.0% had a female householder with no husband present, and 17.2% were non-families. 14.9% of households were one person and 2.4% were one person aged 65 or older. The average household size was 2.83 and the average family size was 3.17.

The age distribution was 30.8% under the age of 18, 5.0% from 18 to 24, 29.0% from 25 to 44, 28.8% from 45 to 64, and 6.4% 65 or older. The median age was 38 years. For every 100 females, there were 96.0 males. For every 100 females age 18 and over, there were 92.8 males.

The median household income was $83,715 and the median family income was $92,579. Males had a median income of $70,462 versus $35,179 for females. The per capita income for the community was $35,511. About 1.3% of families and 1.3% of the population were below the poverty line, including 0.6% of those under age 18 and 2.7% of those age 65 or over.
