= West Virginia Route 65 =

State highway in Mingo County, West Valley, United States

West Virginia Route 65

Route information
- Maintained by WVDOH
- Length: 23.8 mi (38.3 km)

Major junctions
- South end: WV 49 in Matewan
- US 52 near Delbarton; US 119 near Myrtle
- North end: US 52 in Naugatuck

Location
- Country: United States
- State: West Virginia
- Counties: Mingo

Highway system
- West Virginia State Highway System; Interstate; US; State
← I-64	→ WV 66

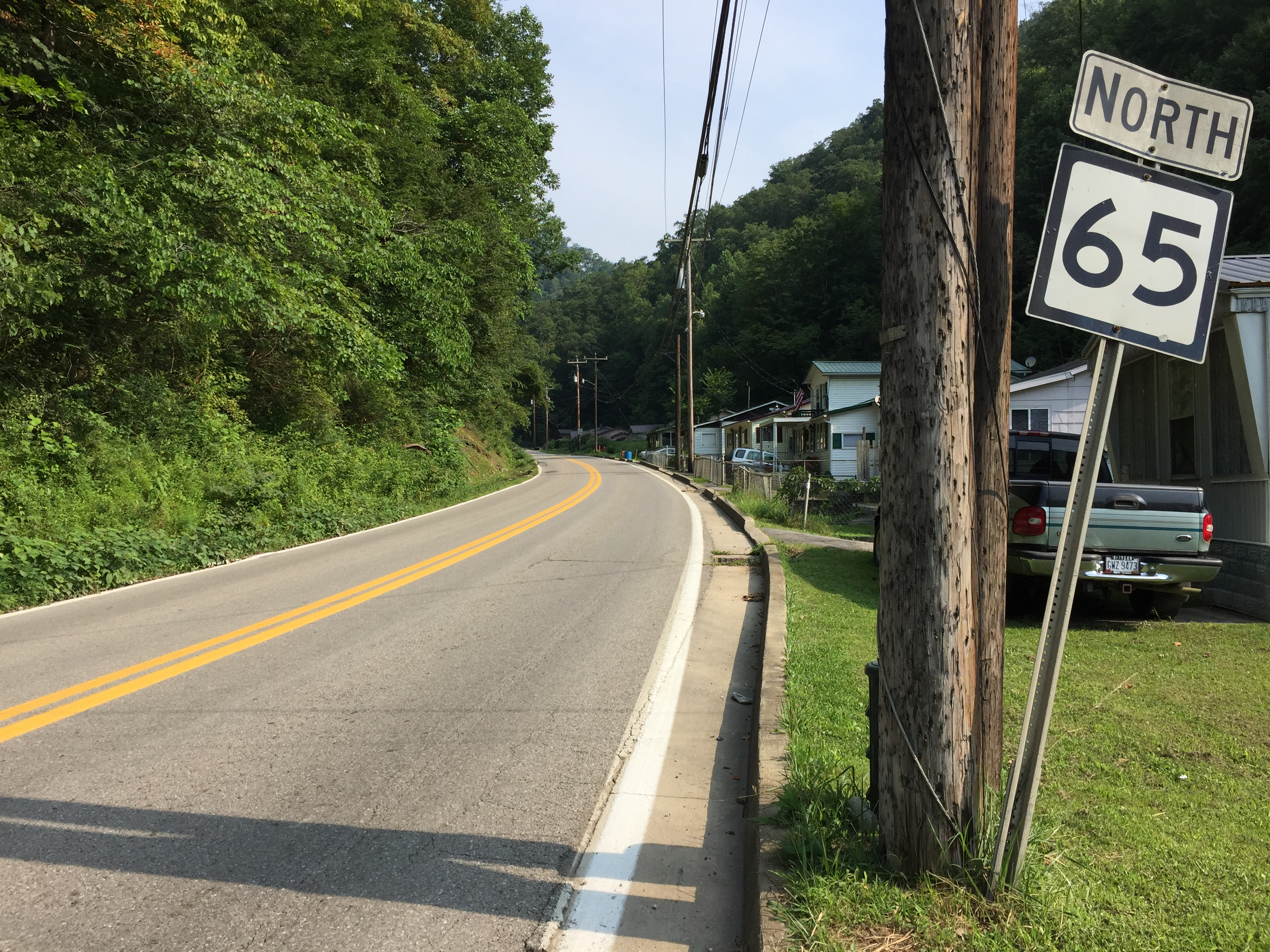
View north along WV 65 at CR 6 in Red Jacket

West Virginia Route 65 is a north–south state highway located within Mingo County, West Virginia, United States. The southern terminus of the route is at West Virginia Route 49 in Matewan. The northern terminus is at U.S. Route 52 in Naugatuck.

== Major intersections ==
The entire route is in Mingo County.

Location	mi	km	Destinations	Notes
Matewan			WV 49 – Edgarton, Matewan	
			US 52 south (King Coal Highway) – Welch	South end of US 52 overlap
			CR 252/57 (Old US 52)	Former US 52 south
Delbarton			US 52 north – Williamson	North end of US 52 overlap
Belo			US 119 north – Logan	South end of US 119 overlap
			US 119 south – Williamson	North end of US 119 overlap
Naugatuck			US 52 – Williamson, Kermit, Huntington	
1.000 mi = 1.609 km; 1.000 km = 0.621 mi: Concurrency terminus
