= Eugene Crum =

American law enforcement officer

Walter "Eugene" Crum
- Born: December 24, 1953; Logan, West Virginia, U.S.
- Died: April 3, 2013 (aged 59); Williamson, West Virginia, U.S.
- Cause of death: Gunshot wound
- Resting place: Lenore Memorial Gardens Lenore, West Virginia, U.S.
- Occupations: Correction Officer, Matewan Police Department Officer, Chief of Police for Delbarton, Mingo County Magistrate, Mingo County Chief Magistrate, Special Investigator for the Mingo County's Prosecutor's Office, and Mingo County Sheriff
- Known for: Short term as Mingo County's Sheriff, life-long service to Mingo County, and Operation Zero Tolerance.
- Spouse: Rosie Martin Crum
- Children: Julie Hall and Eugene "Bub" Crum
- Parent(s): Walter Crum and Myrl Steele Crum
- Relatives: Sheryl Jackson, Sue Curry, Freddie Crum, Denny Crum, and Jeff Justice.

Walter "Eugene" Crum (December 24, 1953 – April 3, 2013) was the sheriff of Mingo County, West Virginia, USA, from January 1 to April 3, 2013. He is notable for having been murdered after having served for only three months and two days in his position. His death was widely reported in news sources, including Fox News, the Huffington Post and CBS, throughout the United States.

== Early life and career ==
Walter "Eugene" Crum, a graduate of Burch High School, began his career in law enforcement as a correction officer for four years before serving with the Matewan and Delbarton Police Departments in Mingo County, West Virginia. Crum served as a police officer in the Matewan Police Department, while working with Chief Dave Stratton for 11 years before accepting the Chief of Police position with the town of Delbarton. After achieving the role of Chief of Police in Delbarton, Crum stepped down and ran successfully for the office of Mingo County Magistrate. He served 10 years on the bench as a Mingo County Magistrate, six of them as a chief magistrate, before resigning to run for the office as Mingo County Sheriff. While he was waiting to take the office, he was hired by Prosecuting Attorney C. Michael Sparks as a special investigator for the Mingo County's Prosecutor's office. Eugene Crum had nearly three decades of direct law enforcement experience as his qualification to become sheriff.

== Sheriff of Mingo County ==
Crum's term as sheriff of Mingo County was brief, but made a huge impact. Within the 93 days that Crum was the Sheriff of Mingo County, he had 57 felony drug convictions. According to the Mingo County Circuit Judge Michael Thornsbury, Crum had done more than any other sheriff of Mingo County within the previous 30 years and he had made more indictments than Mingo County had seen in the previous eight years. As sheriff, Crum was determined to put a stop to illegal drug trafficking in the county. As a sign of dedication to Mingo County and to his passion in law enforcement, Crum would eat his lunch in his official cruiser every day, just to observe a pill mill that had been shut down a few years before to make sure it did not open again. Even before Crum took office as sheriff in January, he worked day and night making arrests and obtaining indictments, while he was a Drug Task Force Commander. While Sheriff Crum, his deputies, and other law enforcement agencies in Mingo County worked to wipe out crime, especially targeting drug dealers, Crum had received personal threats because of his fight to stop prescription drug abuse. When Crum was confronted by Judge Michael Thornsbury about the threats that he had been receiving, he said, "I'm fighting back, I'm going to fight the good fight." It was only minutes later that he was murdered. Judge Thornbury was later sentenced to four years in prison for a corruption scheme involving a defendant who had information about Crums illegal prescription use and campaign contribution violations.

== Murder ==
Crum was shot at point blank range while sitting in his official vehicle in a parking lot, while he was eating his lunch, at the corner of Third Avenue and Harvey Street on Wednesday, April 3, 2013, in Williamson, West Virginia, shortly after noon. Tennis Melvin Maynard, age 37, of Ragland, West Virginia, walked up to the sheriff's SUV and at point blank range, allegedly shot Crum in the forehead and temple region, killing him instantly. After killing Crum, Maynard fled from the scene travelling south on U.S. 52 toward Delbarton, where he was shot and seriously wounded by Mingo County Sheriff's Department Corporal Norman Mines, after pulling a gun on him. Maynard was transported to Regional Medical Center in Logan County, West Virginia, and was later transferred to Cabell Huntington Hospital in Huntington, West Virginia. Crum was pronounced dead at the scene by the Mingo County Medical Examiner, Mike Casey, and was transported to the State Medical Examiner's Office in Charleston, West Virginia, for autopsy.

The handgun allegedly used to murder Crum was confiscated from Maynard's vehicle, and was identified by Mingo County Sheriff's Department Sgt. Joe Smith as a compact .40 caliber Glock handgun.

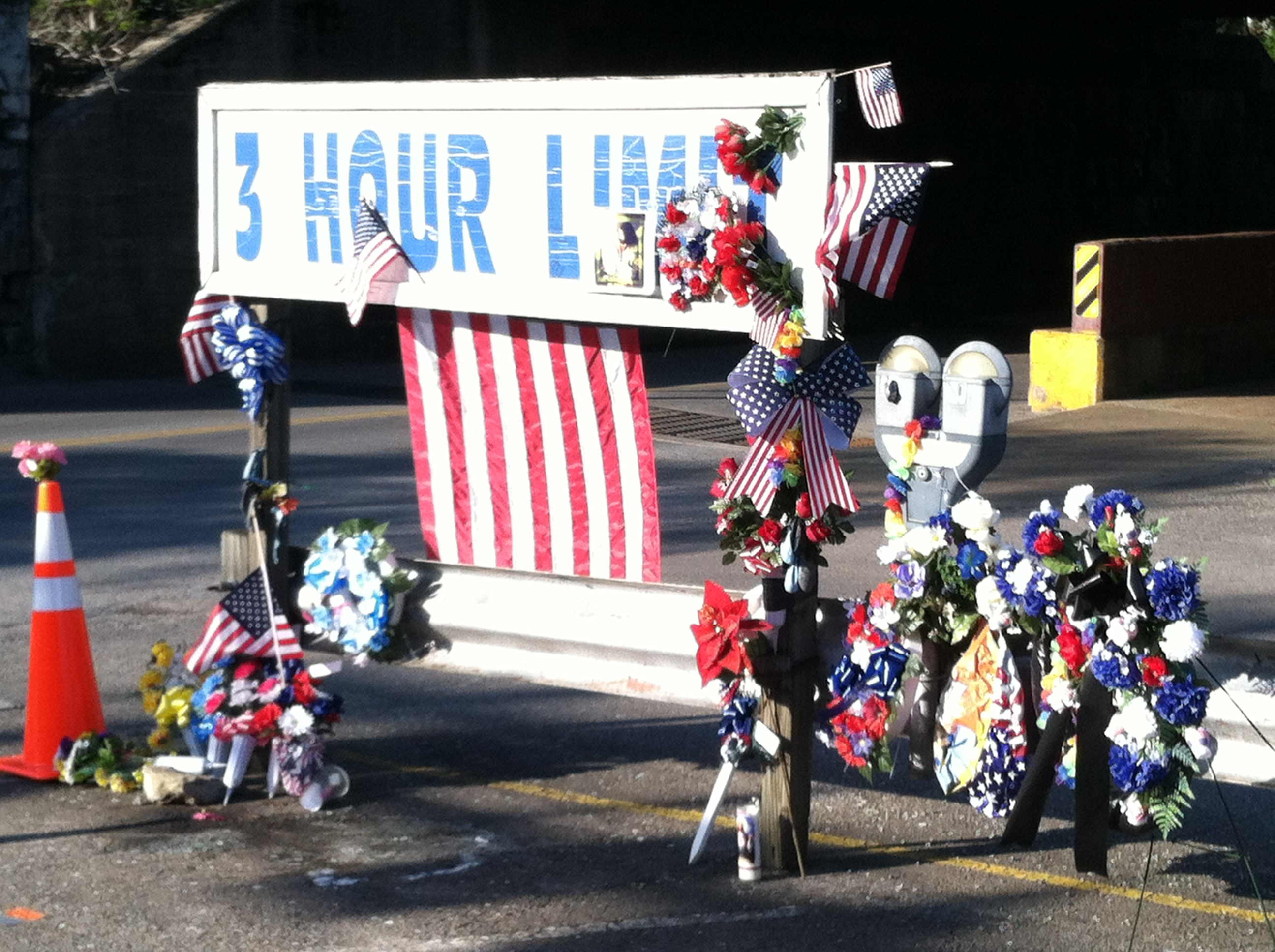
Memorial at the site of Crum's murder

== Interim Sheriff ==
After the murder of Crum, a special meeting was held by the Mingo County Commission on Thursday, April 4, 2013, to name an interim sheriff for the remainder of Crum's term which would expire at the end of 2016. Rosie Crum, his widow, was unanimously appointed to fill the remainder of the term left vacant by her husband's tragic death by the three members of the county commission, and was sworn into office by Circuit Judge Michael Thorsbury during the candlelight vigil held on April 4, 2013, at 8 p.m., next to the courthouse in Williamson.

== Accused murderer ==
Tennis Melvin Maynard, the man accused of shooting and killing Crum, was known to be mentally disturbed, but has never claimed or shown signs of having a vendetta against law enforcement. The possible cause for Maynard's mental disturbance, according to his father, might have been due to harmful chemicals and an injury while working in an Alabama coal mine. Maynard's father claimed that he would probably not have targeted Crum. However, Maynard's father also stated that his son was "off" and he could have probably shot anybody, the first one he came across.

== Accused murderer's indictment ==
The Mingo County Grand Jury convened on Monday, April 23, 2013, with Cabell County Circuit Court Judge Paul T. Farell presiding on special assignment to hear the indictment of Maynard for fatally shooting Crum on April 3 and attempting to kill a deputy. The indictment read as follows:

(Count 1; 1st Degree Murder, possible life sentence) Tennis Melvin Maynard, on or about the 3rd day of April, 2013, in Mingo County did unlawfully, knowingly, intentionally, willfully, maliciously, deliberately, premeditatedly and feloniously murder Sheriff Eugene Crum, against the peace and dignity of the State of West Virginia.
(Count 2; Attempt to commit 1st Degree Murder, 3–15 years) The defendant, on or about the 3rd day of April, 2013, in Mingo County, did unlawfully, intentionally and feloniously attempt to murder Corporal Norman Mines by pointing a loaded firearm directly at the officer after Corporal Mines pursued and stopped Tennis Melvin Maynard's vehicle in connection with the murder of Sheriff Eugene Crum, but fell short of murdering Corporal Norman Mines, against the peace and dignity of the State of West Virginia.
(Count 3; fleeing/reckless indifference, 1–5 years) On or about 3rd day of April, 2013, in Mingo County, Tennis Melvin Maynard did unlawfully, knowingly, intentionally and feloniously operate a vehicle in a matter showing reckless indifference to the safety of others while fleeing from Corporal Norman Mines acting in an official capacity after Corporal Norman Mines gave a clear, visual and audible signal directing Maynard to stop, against the peace and dignity of the State of West Virginia.

Testimony was provided by Williamson Police Chief C.D. Rockel and West Virginia State Police 1st Sgt. C.E. Stump. Maynard was arraigned on these three charges before Judge Ferrel following his discharge from Cabell Huntington Hospital. In 2015, he was found incompetent to stand trial. In 2021, Maynard was found to still be incompetent, meaning he will likely be institutionalized for the rest of his life.

== Funeral ==
Crum's funeral was held on Sunday, April 7, at 1 p.m. inside the Mingo Central High School gymnasium. Several thousands attended the visitation and funeral. Over 500 law enforcement officials were in attendance from all across the USA including Alaska, California, Mississippi and Texas, and 273 police cruisers participated in the funeral procession as a show of respect.

In 2015, Crum's widow, Rosie Crum, sued the funeral home and several county officials over burial expenses. The suit was dismissed by the Mingo County Circuit Court, and this dismissal was upheld by the Supreme Court of Appeals of West Virginia on October 28, 2016.

== FBI case ==
On August 5, 2014, the FBI issued a press release regarding a public corruption case in Mingo County which named Crum. Specifically, the FBI alleges that Circuit Court Judge Michael Thornsbury coerced a drug defendant to dismiss his defense counsel and replace him with one of his and his co-conspirator's choosing, after it came to light that the drug defendant had information about Crum being involved with illegal prescription drug use and illicit campaign contributions. Thornsbury was sentenced to four years imprisonment for his role, while the former prosecuting attorney Michael Sparks was sentenced to one year.
