= Taylorville, West Virginia =

- Unincorporated community
- Location within West Virginia Location within the United States
- Coordinates: 37°39′51″N 82°9′23″W
- Country: United States
- State: West Virginia
- County: Mingo
- Elevation: 866 ft (264 m)
- Time zone: UTC-5 (Eastern (EST))
  - Summer (DST): UTC-4 (EDT)
- GNIS feature ID: 1547942

Taylorville is an unincorporated community in Mingo County, West Virginia, United States. Its post office is closed.

The Burl Stafford Bridge, a bridge that crosses the Pigeon Creek, a tributary of the Tug Fork, is located in Taylorville, West Virginia.
