= Vulcan Bridge =

Bridge in West Virginia

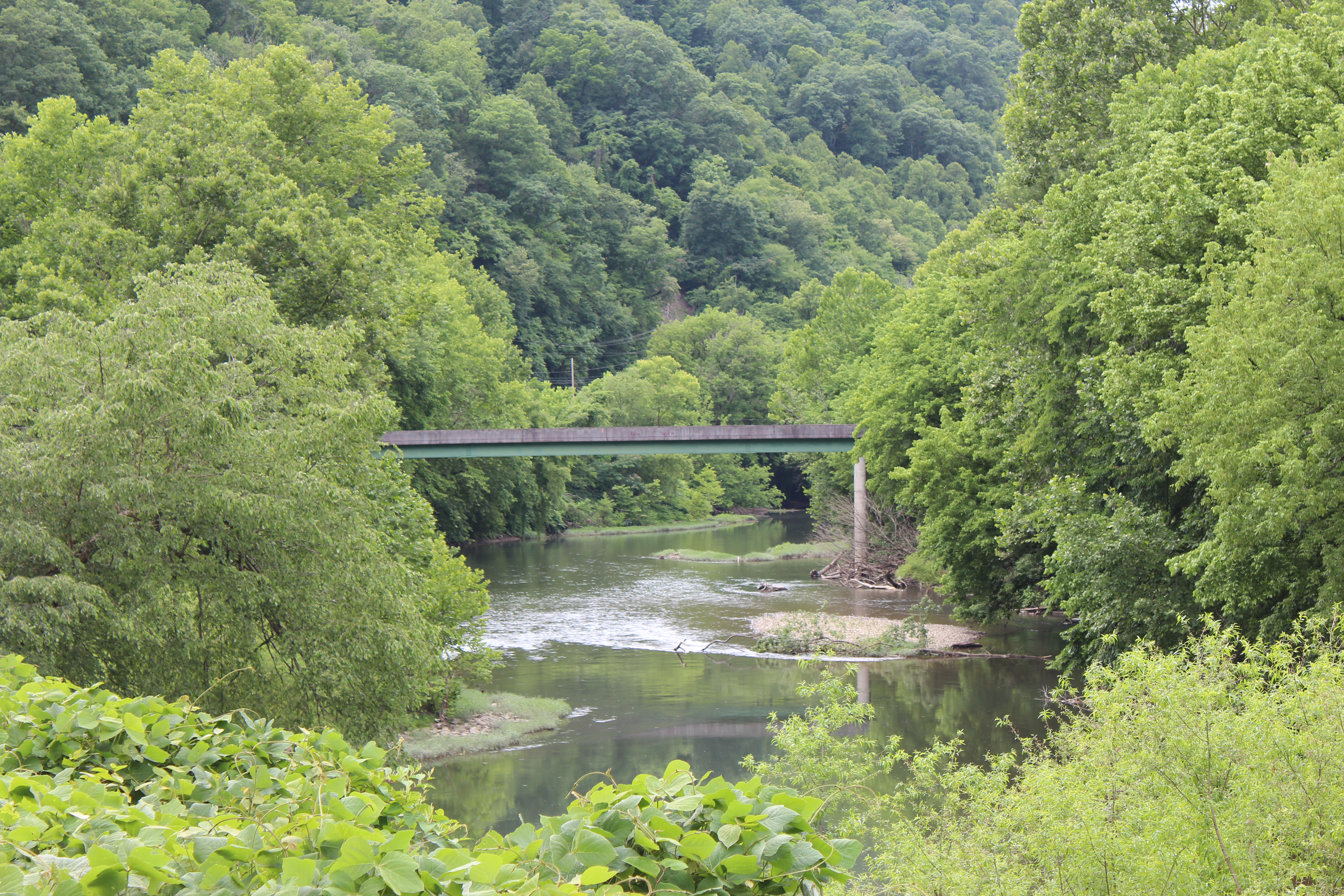
- Vulcan Bridge
- Coordinates: 37°33′06″N 82°07′32″W
- Crosses: Tug Fork
- Locale: Vulcan, West Virginia, U.S.

Characteristics
- Material: Concrete
- No. of lanes: 1

History
- Built: 1980

Location
- Click on map for a fullscreen view

The Vulcan Bridge is a one-lane bridge located in Vulcan, West Virginia, USA. It spans the Tug Fork and the Kentucky–West Virginia border. In 1977, after several failed attempts in contacting the West Virginia government to build a new bridge, the mayor of Vulcan requested aid from the Soviet Union to build the bridge, since the previous one had collapsed. This event placed international attention on the small community, and the state legislature subsequently granted $1.3 million to build the bridge. It was completed in 1980.

== History ==
=== Original swinging bridge ===
For several years, the community of Vulcan relied on an aged swinging bridge to cross the Tug Fork. The only way residents could access the community was by driving up the Kentucky side of the Tug Fork and crossing the bridge, which was too narrow for vehicular traffic. The swinging bridge was constructed by a coal company prior, and was on the brink of collapse. Students from Vulcan had to creep under parked train cars to get to and from school. On one occasion, a student lost a leg doing this. On several occasions, the mayor of Vulcan, John Robinette, asked county, state, and federal governments to repair the bridge, but was met with silence. In July 1975, the swinging bridge collapsed.

=== Soviet aid ===
After the collapse of the swinging bridge, the only route to Vulcan was a narrow gravel road of about two miles, making it extremely difficult to travel in and out of the area. For several years, mayor John Robinette petitioned the state government to construct a new bridge, but was ignored by officials. With no help from the state and federal government, Robinette made the decision to ask the Soviet Union for aid. Twice, he sent letters to Soviet leader Leonid Brezhnev but received no reply.

Eventually, Iona Andronov, a reporter from Moscow, heard about the story, and decided to travel to Vulcan to report on the community's struggles. The Soviets saw an opportunity to embarrass the United States, and promised that if the state did not fund a new bridge, the Soviets would. Andronov arrived in Vulcan on December 17, 1977, and within an hour of his visit, reporters there were told that the state would fund the construction of the new bridge. The West Virginia Legislature provided US$1.3 million toward the construction of a new one-lane concrete bridge, which was completed in 1980 and still stands. On July 9, 1980, mayor John Robinette christened the newly opened bridge with two bottles of Russian vodka.
