= Sprigg, West Virginia =

Sprigg
- Unincorporated community
- Location within West Virginia Location within the United States
- Coordinates: 37°37′43″N 82°11′50″W
- Country: United States
- State: West Virginia
- County: Mingo
- Elevation: 702 ft (214 m)
- Time zone: UTC-5 (Eastern (EST))
  - Summer (DST): UTC-4 (EDT)
- Area codes: 304 & 681
- GNIS feature ID: 1555688

Sprigg is an unincorporated community in Mingo County, West Virginia, United States. Sprigg is located on the Tug Fork and West Virginia Route 49, 5.4 miles (8.7 km) southeast of Williamson. Sprigg had a post office, which opened on May 5, 1896, and closed on April 19, 1997.
