= Horsepen, West Virginia =

Horsepen, West Virginia may refer to:

- Horsepen, Mingo County, West Virginia, a former community
- Horsepen, Virginia, which originally had a post office in West Virginia
