= Blackberry City, West Virginia =

Unincorporated community in West Virginia, United States

- Unincorporated community
- Location within West Virginia Location within the United States
- Coordinates: 37°36′41″N 82°09′59″W
- Country: United States
- State: West Virginia
- County: Mingo
- Elevation: 764 ft (233 m)
- Time zone: UTC-5 (Eastern (EST))
  - Summer (DST): UTC-4 (EDT)
- Area codes: 304 & 681
- GNIS feature ID: 1536058

Blackberry City is an unincorporated community in Mingo County, West Virginia, United States. Blackberry City is located on the Tug Fork and West Virginia Route 49, 0.75 miles (1.21 km) south of Matewan. Blackberry City had a post office, which opened on September 2, 1949, and closed on March 17, 1984.
