= West Virginia Route 49 =

State highway in West Virginia, United States

West Virginia Route 49

Route information
- Maintained by WVDOH
- Length: 18.9 mi (30.4 km)

Major junctions
- South end: KY 194 Spur near Vulcan
- North end: US 52 near Williamson

Location
- Country: United States
- State: West Virginia
- Counties: Mingo

Highway system
- West Virginia State Highway System; Interstate; US; State
← WV 48	→ US 50

West Virginia Route 49 is a north–south state highway located within Mingo County, West Virginia. The southern terminus is at the Kentucky state line, where WV 49 becomes the short Kentucky Route 194 Spur upon crossing the Tug Fork of the Big Sandy River. The northern terminus is at U.S. Route 52 three miles (5 km) east of Williamson.

== Route description ==
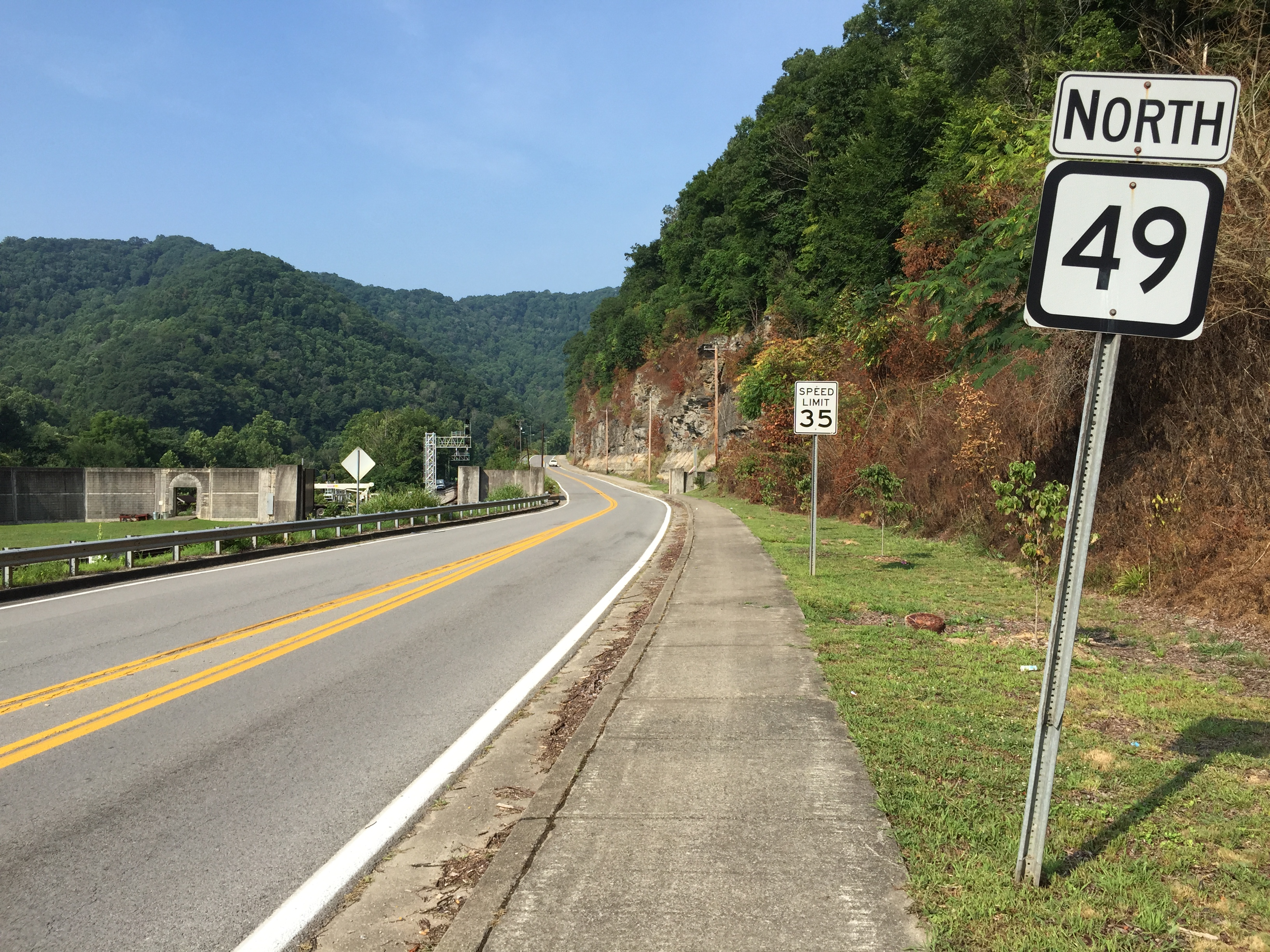
View north along WV 49 in Matewan

KY 194 Spur, a 150-yard (140 m) long spur of Kentucky Route 194, becomes WV 49 upon entering West Virginia. WV 49 turns north and runs parallel to the Tug Fork and a Norfolk Southern rail line until terminating at US 52 near Williamson.

== Major intersections ==
The entire route is in Mingo County.

Location	mi	km	Destinations	Notes
Edgarton			KY 194 (via KY 194 Spur)	Kentucky state line (Edgarton Bridge over Tug Fork)
Matewan			WV 65 north to US 52 – Delbarton	
Matewan			CR 49/10 (Old WV 68) – Downtown Matewan, Buskirk, KY	to KY 1056
Williamson			US 52	
1.000 mi = 1.609 km; 1.000 km = 0.621 mi
