= Wyoming City, West Virginia =

Wyoming City
- Unincorporated community
- Location within West Virginia Wyoming City (the United States)
- Coordinates: 37°30′35″N 81°55′42″W
- Country: United States
- State: West Virginia
- Counties: McDowell, Mingo
- Elevation: 928 ft (283 m)
- Time zone: UTC-5 (Eastern (EST))
  - Summer (DST): UTC-4 (EDT)
- Area codes: 304 & 681
- GNIS feature ID: 1556035

Wyoming City (also known as Vedra and Wyoming) is an unincorporated community in Mingo and McDowell counties in West Virginia, United States. Wyoming City is 7 miles (11 km) west-northwest of Iaeger.

Wyoming City is on the Norfolk Southern Railway (former Norfolk and Western) network and the Tug Fork river.
