= Rawl, West Virginia =

- Unincorporated community
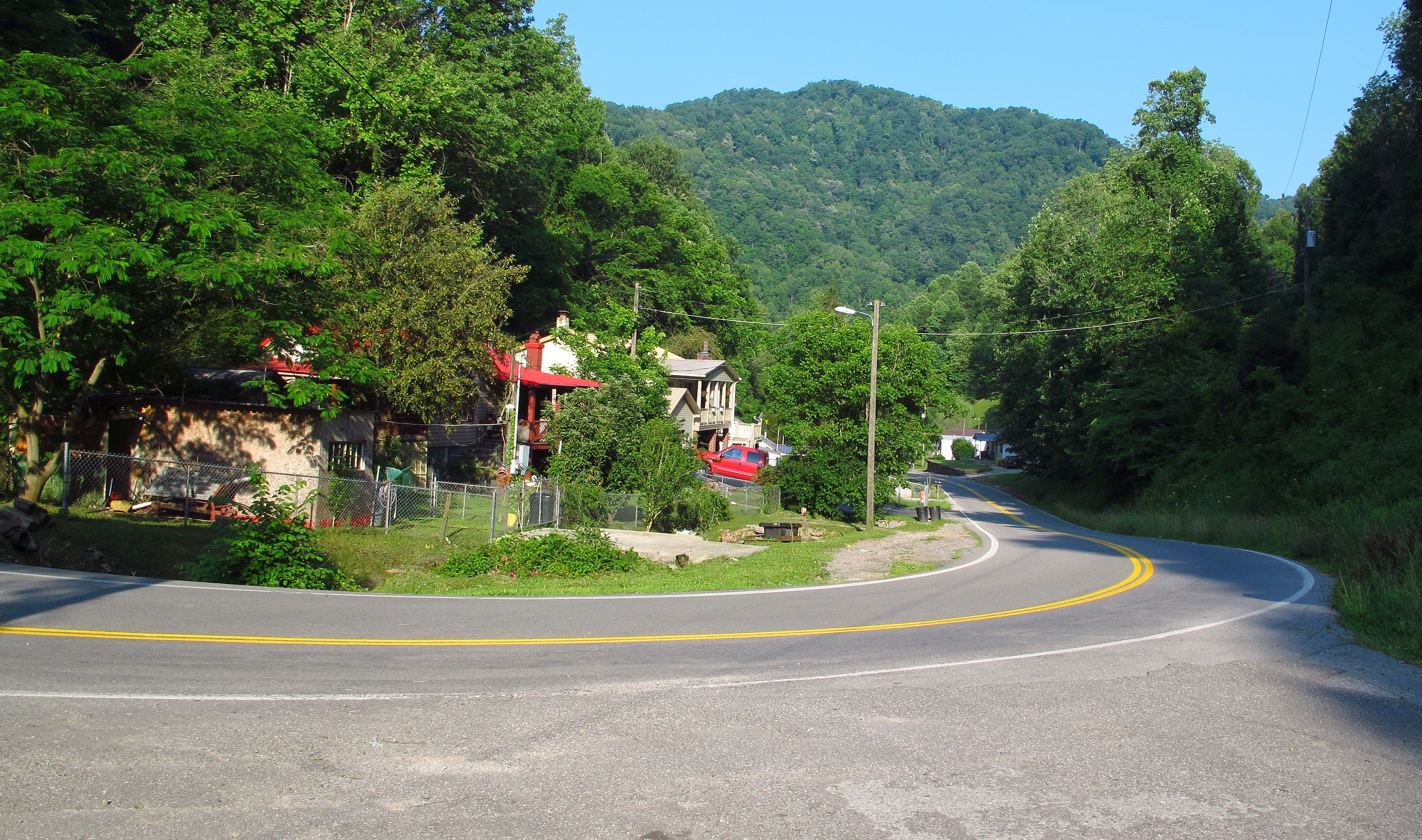
- Rawl

- Location within West Virginia Location within the United States
- Coordinates: 37°38′59″N 82°13′10″W
- Country: United States
- State: West Virginia
- County: Mingo
- Elevation: 709 ft (216 m)
- Time zone: UTC-5 (Eastern (EST))
  - Summer (DST): UTC-4 (EDT)
- ZIP code: 25691
- Area codes: 304 & 681
- GNIS feature ID: 1555446

Rawl is an unincorporated community in Mingo County, West Virginia, United States. Rawl is located on the Tug Fork across from Kentucky, 3.5 miles (5.6 km) southeast of Williamson. Rawl has a post office with ZIP code 25691.
