= Meador =

Meador may refer to:

- Meador, Kentucky, a rural unincorporated community in northern Allen County, Kentucky, United States
- Meador, West Virginia, an unincorporated community in Mingo County, West Virginia, United States
- 25491 Meador, a main-belt minor planet
- James Craig (1912-1985), American actor, born James Henry Meador
- Brad Meador (born 1975), American Baseball executive
- Daniel Meador (1926–2013), American legal scholar
- Ed Meador (1937–2023), a former American football defensive back
- Joshua Meador (1911–1965), an animator, special effects artist, and animation director for the Disney studio
- Johnny Meador (1892–1970), a pitcher in Major League Baseball
- Jo Walker-Meador (1924-2017), American Country music executive
- Mark Meador (born 1985), American lawyer, Commissioner of the Federal Trade Commission
