= Laurel Lake Wildlife Management Area =

Protected area in West Virginia, United States

- IUCN category V (protected landscape/seascape)
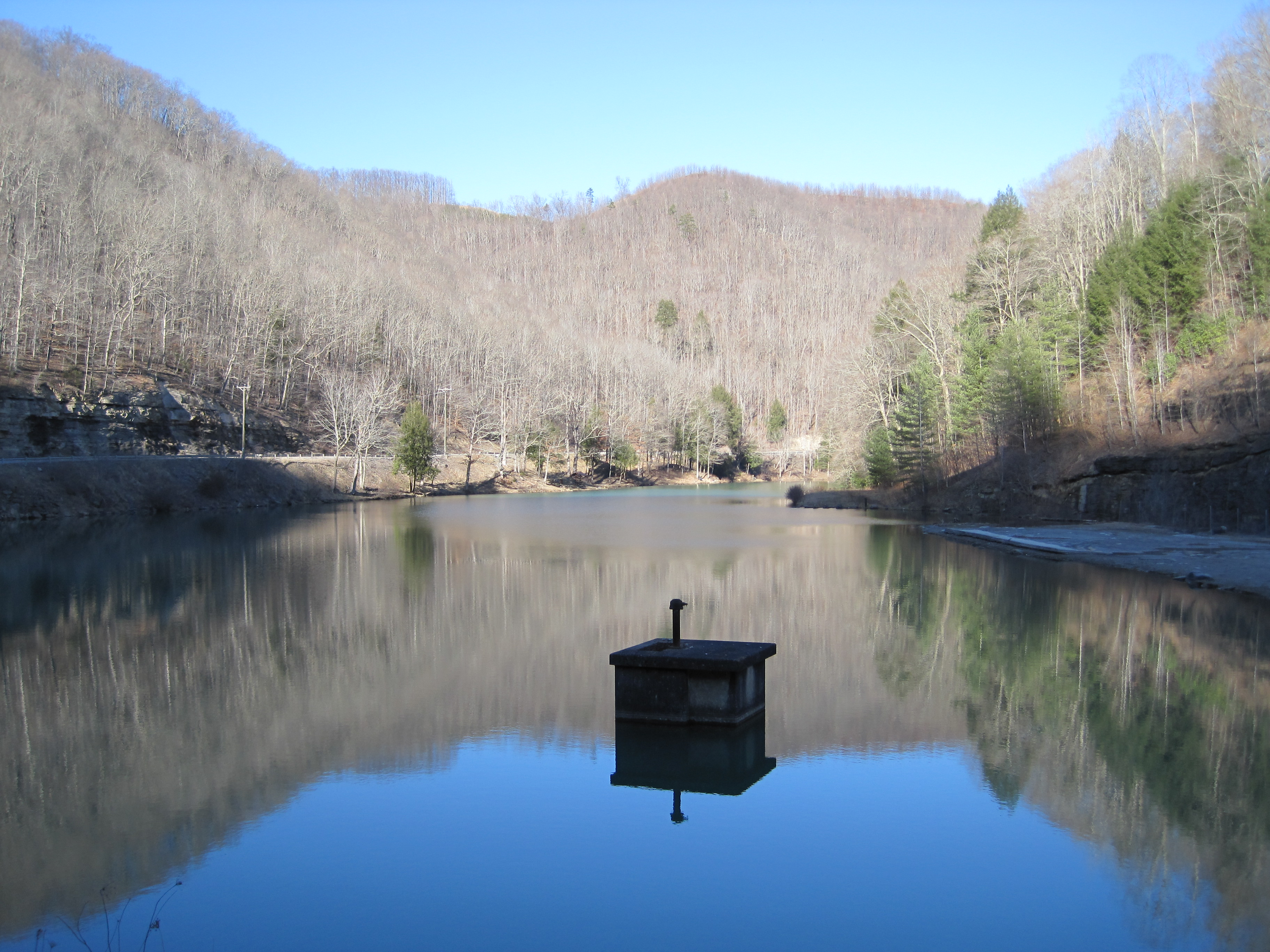
- Laurel Lake

- Location within West Virginia Location within the United States
- Location: Mingo, West Virginia, United States
- Coordinates: 37°50′32″N 82°13′07″W
- Area: 12,856 acres (52.03 km^{2})
- Elevation: 790 ft (240 m)
- Established: 1960
- Operator: West Virginia Division of Natural Resources

Laurel Lake Wildlife Management Area is located between Dingess and Lenore in Mingo County, West Virginia. Located on 12,856 acres (5,203 ha) of steep terrain with narrow valleys and ridgetops, the WMA contains second growth mixed hardwoods and hemlock with thick understory of mountain laurel and rhododendron.

To reach Laurel Lake WMA from Lenore, follow Old Norfolk & Western Railroad Bed Road (County Route 3/5) east about 6 miles (9.7 km) to Laurel Lake.

== Hunting and fishing ==
Hunting opportunities include bear, deer, grouse, raccoon, squirrel, and turkey.

Fishing opportunities in the 29-acre (12 ha) Laurel Lake can include smallmouth bass, channel catfish, and bluegill.

Camping is not permitted in the WMA. Camping and lodging are available at nearby Chief Logan State Park and Cabwaylingo State Forest.

== Dingess Petroglyphs ==
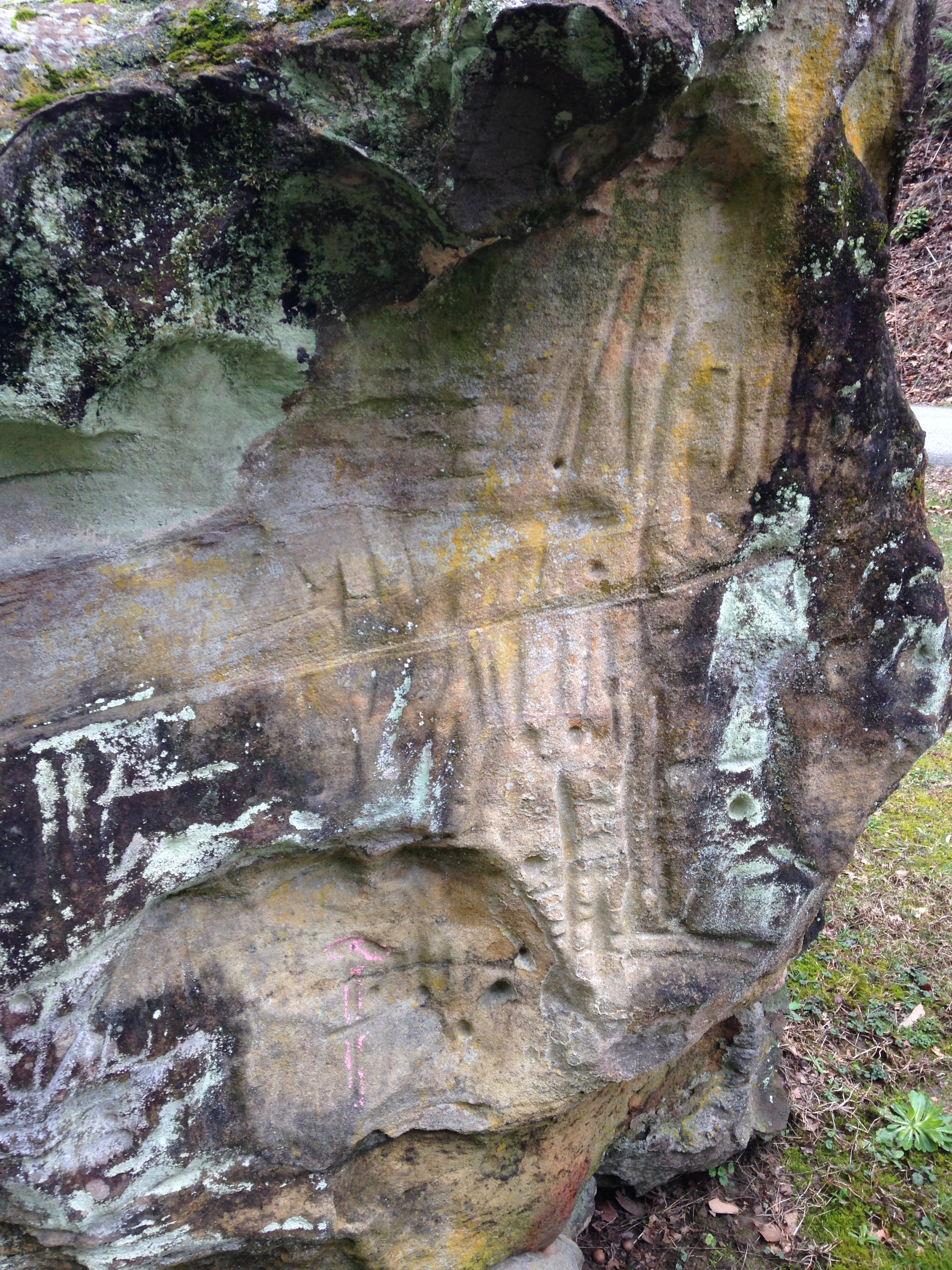
The Dingess Petroglyphs

The Dingess Petroglyphs serve as one of the more noteworthy attractions at Laurel Lake.

== See also ==
- Animal conservation
- Fishing
- Hunting
- List of West Virginia wildlife management areas
