= Sprattsville, West Virginia =

Sprattsville
- Unincorporated community
- Location within the state of West Virginia Sprattsville (the United States)
- Coordinates: 37°36′00″N 81°52′21″W
- Country: United States
- State: West Virginia
- County: Mingo
- Elevation: 866 ft (264 m)
- Time zone: UTC-5 (Eastern (EST))
  - Summer (DST): UTC-4 (EDT)
- GNIS ID: 1555685

Sprattsville is an unincorporated community in Mingo County, West Virginia, United States.
