= Dingess, West Virginia =

Unincorporated community in West Virginia, United States

- Unincorporated community
- Location within West Virginia Location within the United States
- Coordinates: 37°52′20″N 82°10′29″W
- Country: United States
- State: West Virginia
- County: Mingo
- Elevation: 971 ft (296 m)
- Time zone: UTC-5 (Eastern (EST))
  - Summer (DST): UTC-4 (EDT)
- ZIP code: 25671
- Area codes: 304 & 681
- GNIS feature ID: 1554306

Dingess is an unincorporated community in Mingo County, West Virginia, United States. Dingess is 10 miles (16 km) northeast of Lenore and 13 miles (21 km) west of Logan. Dingess has a post office with ZIP code 25671.

Dingess is known for an approximately mile-long tunnel situated on a county road south of town. Originally built by Italian immigrants, for the Norfolk and Western Railway, the tunnel opened for rail traffic on September 25, 1892. It has been opened to one-lane vehicular traffic since at least the mid-1900s. Additionally, a much shorter tunnel is located between Dingess and Breeden.

== History ==
The community was named after William Anderson Dingess, a pioneer settler.

As of 1894, Dingess contained two hotels, eight boarding houses, four restaurants, four groceries, four saw mills, and a school with two teachers and about 100 students. 133 coal miners lived in Dingess.

The community once garnered a reputation for being a lawless land. In his book They’ll Cut Off Your Project, Huey Perry, wrote “Old-timers there said it was common practice to have a killing once a month. As ‘Uncle’ Jim Marcum described it, 'Why, a colored person couldn’t think about riding through Dingess. They would stop the train, take him off and shoot him, and nobody would say a word. Why, they would even stop the train and take all its cargo. It was a wild country then, and it ain’t much better now.’”

From 1900 to 1972, approximately seventeen lawmen were shot to death in the area which stretches fifteen miles along Twelvepole Creek.

In 1901, robbers raided the community, dynamiting a large safe. According to a November 23, 1901, edition of the Bluefield Daily Telegraph: "Citizens were on the scene almost immediately after the heavy report, and the burglars hadn’t time to gather up their booty as a number of citizens opened fire and probably forty shots were exchanged. The burglars, who secured a lot of valuable jewelry, escaped on a hand car which was recovered later four miles from Dingess, and on which blood spots were plainly visible."

== Education ==
Dingess Grade School serves the educational needs of the community. The school mascot is a dragon. It was built in 1894.

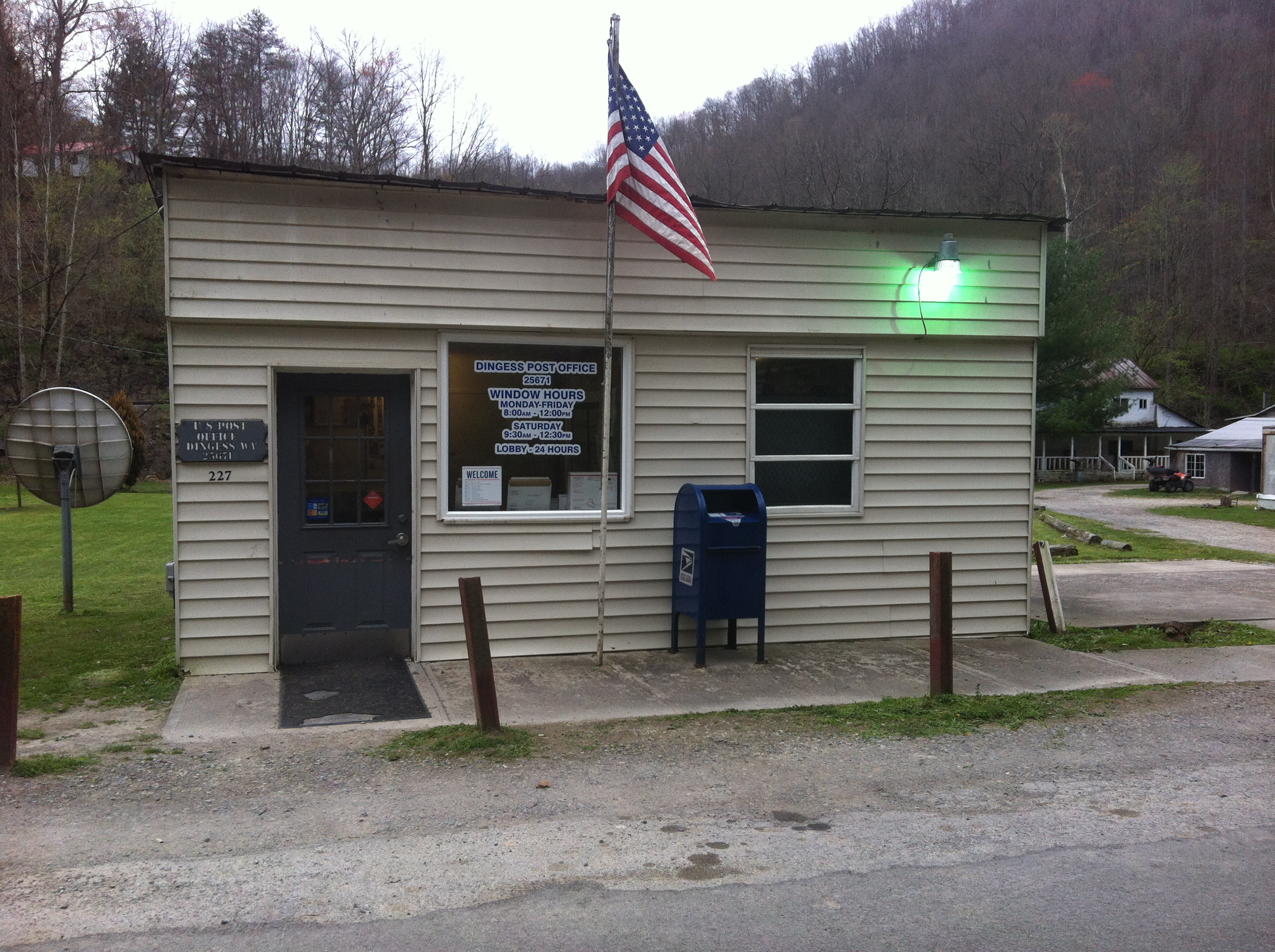
Dingess Post Office, located in Muncy Bottom.

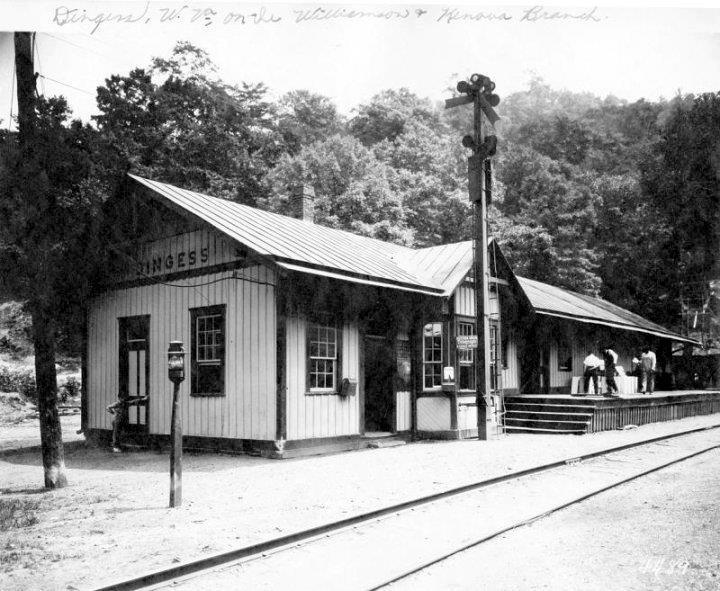
The old Dingess Train Depot

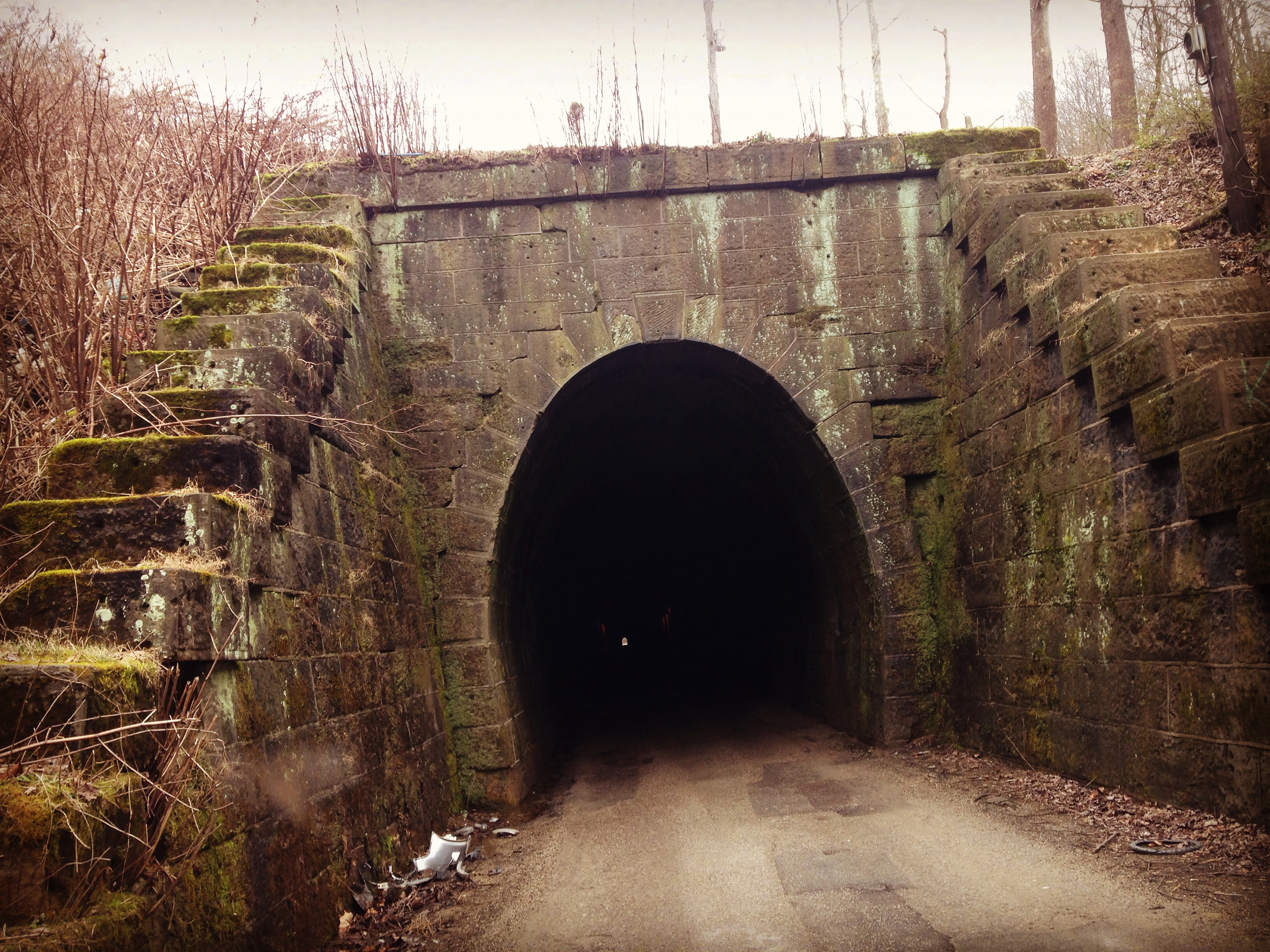
The Dingess Tunnel as it looks today, with paved road and serving single lane traffic.

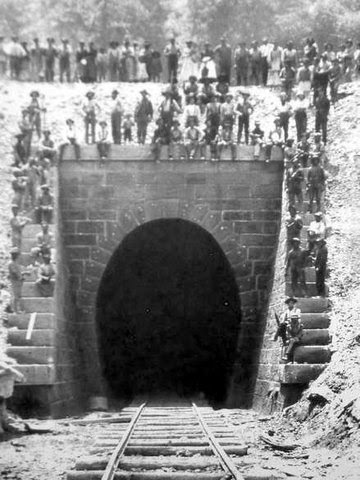
The Dingess Tunnel as it served the Twelve Pole Line of the Norfolk & Western Railway between Lenore and Dingess, WV.

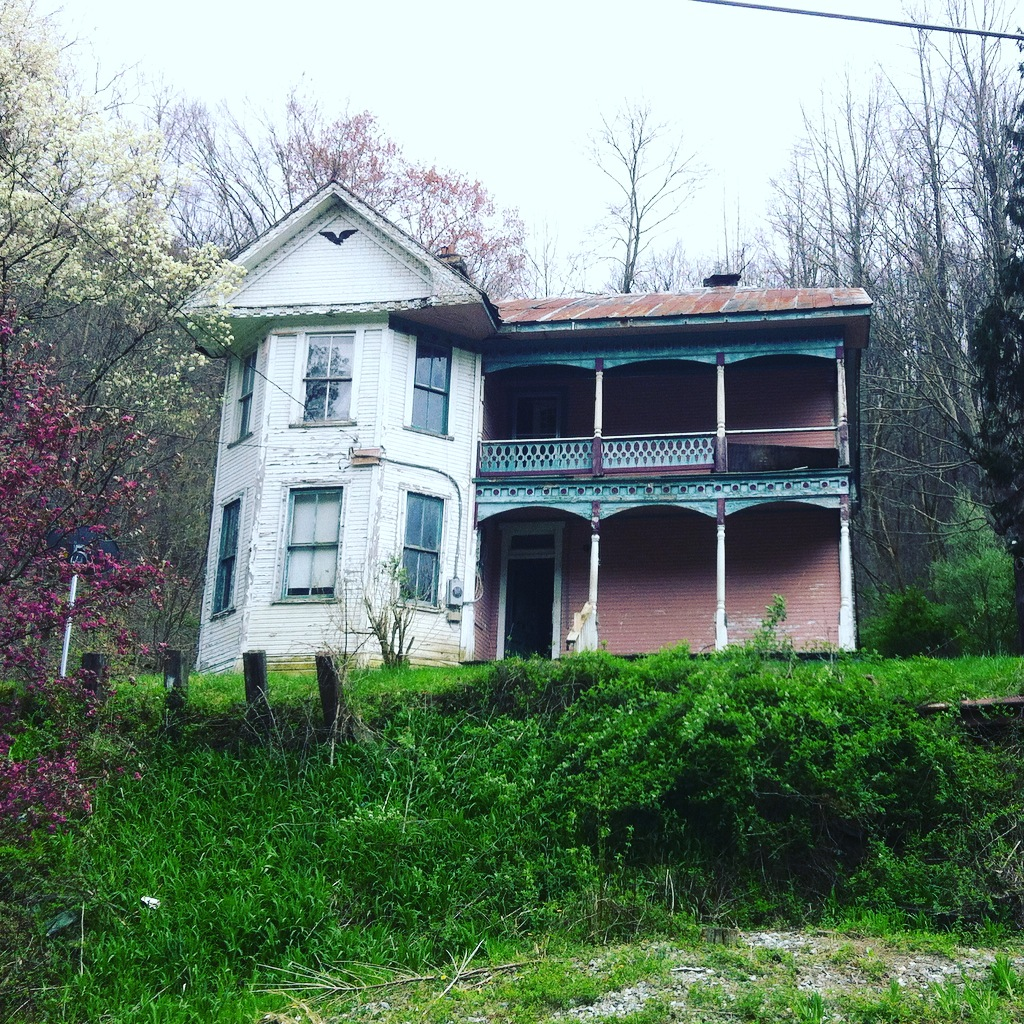
Historic Dingess residence, one of the few remaining structures from the town's boom period.

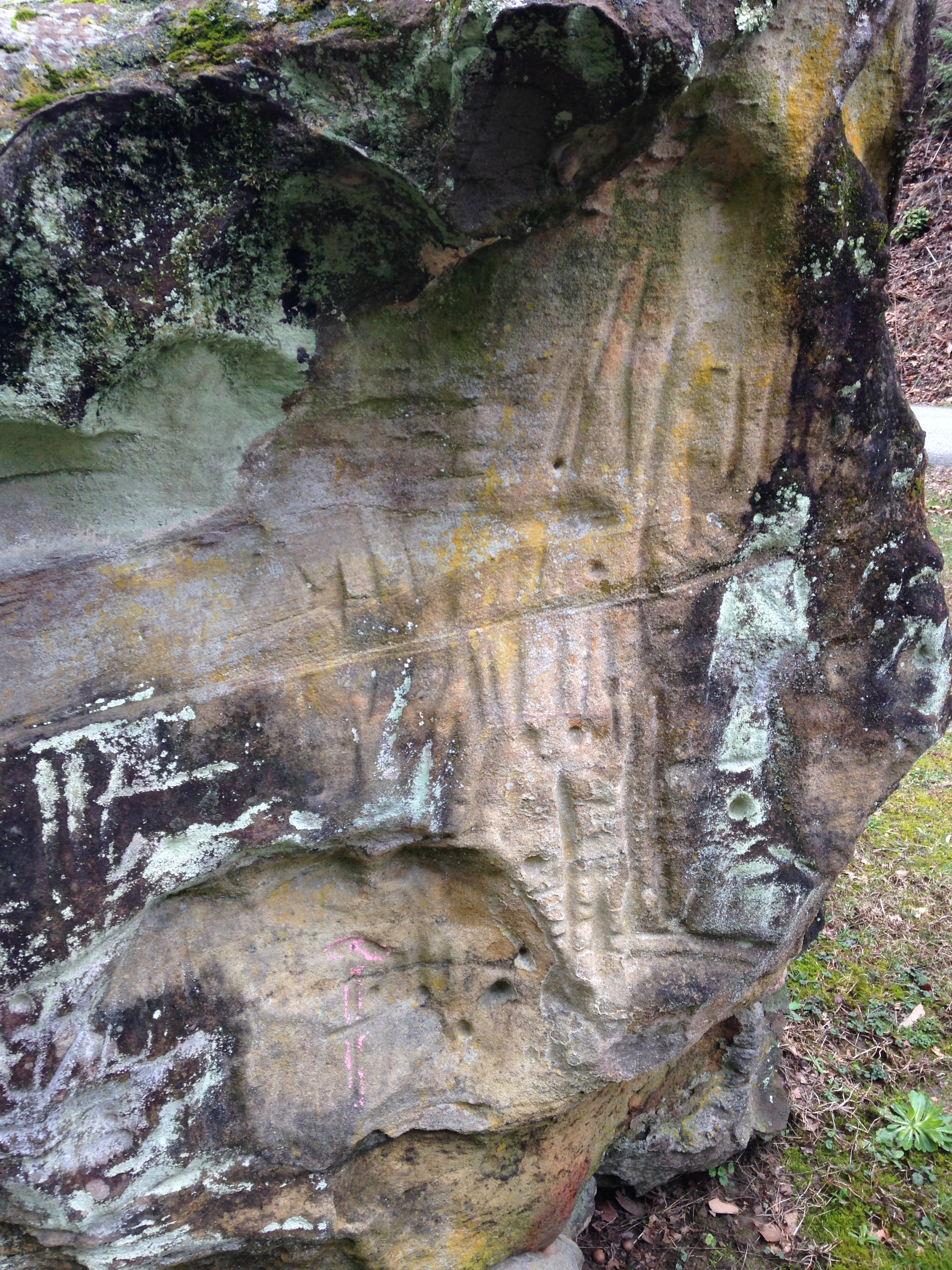
The Dingess Petroglyphs, located at Laurel Lake Wildlife Management Area.
