= Surosa, West Virginia =

Surosa
- Unincorporated community
- Location within the state of West Virginia Surosa (the United States)
- Coordinates: 37°38′29″N 82°10′30″W
- Country: United States
- State: West Virginia
- County: Mingo
- Elevation: 715 ft (218 m)
- Time zone: UTC-5 (Eastern (EST))
  - Summer (DST): UTC-4 (EDT)
- GNIS ID: 1555761

Surosa is an unincorporated community in Mingo County, West Virginia, United States. Their post office no longer exists.

The community's name is an amalgamation of Sue and Rose, the wives of two mining officials.
