= Mate Creek =

Stream in West Virginia, U.S.

Coordinates: 37°37′15″N 82°09′51″W

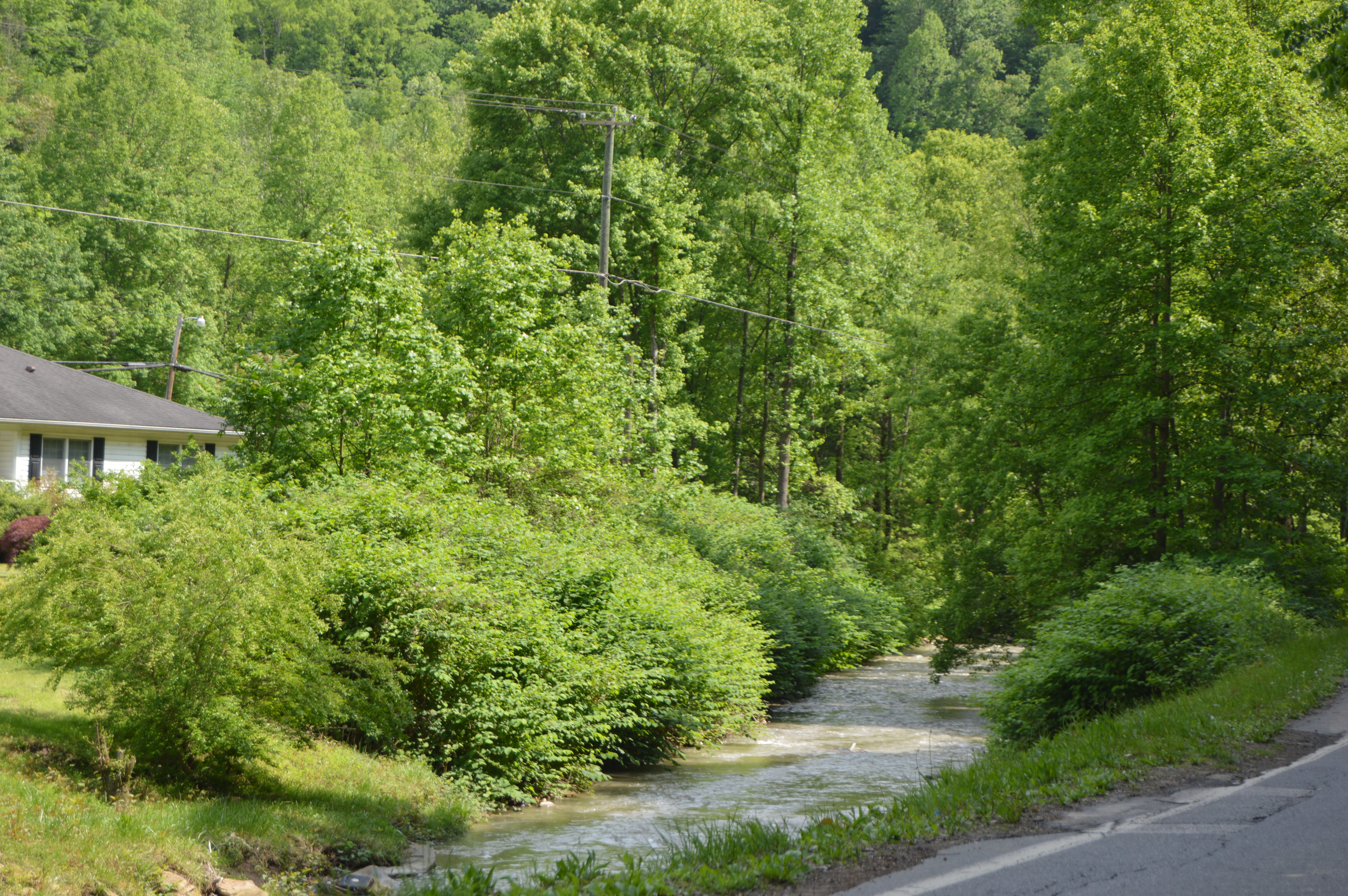
Along WV 65 south of Red Jacket

Mate Creek is a stream in the U.S. state of West Virginia. It is a tributary of Tug Fork.

Mate Creek derives its name from "mate", a variant word for deer.

== See also ==
- List of rivers of West Virginia
