= Naugatuck, West Virginia =

- Unincorporated community
- Location within West Virginia Location within the United States
- Coordinates: 37°47′23″N 82°20′57″W
- Country: United States
- State: West Virginia
- County: Mingo
- Elevation: 627 ft (191 m)
- Time zone: UTC-5 (Eastern (EST))
  - Summer (DST): UTC-4 (EDT)
- ZIP code: 25685
- Area codes: 304 & 681
- GNIS feature ID: 1544057

Naugatuck (formerly known as Mouth of Pigeon) is an unincorporated community in Mingo County, West Virginia, United States. Naugatuck is located on the Tug Fork and U.S. Route 52, 5 miles (8.0 km) southeast of Kermit. Naugatuck has a post office with ZIP code 25685. The community was established in 1892.
