= Kirk, West Virginia =

- Unincorporated community
- Location within West Virginia Location within the United States
- Coordinates: 37°53′39″N 82°14′36″W
- Country: United States
- State: West Virginia
- County: Mingo
- Elevation: 873 ft (266 m)
- Time zone: UTC-5 (Eastern (EST))
  - Summer (DST): UTC-4 (EDT)
- Area codes: 304 & 681
- GNIS feature ID: 1554888

Kirk is an unincorporated community in Mingo County, West Virginia, United States. Kirk is 10 miles (16 km) northeast of Kermit.

An early variant name was Buttercup.
