= Horsepen, Mingo County, West Virginia =

Horsepen
- Unincorporated community
- Location within the state of West Virginia Horsepen (the United States)
- Coordinates: 37°37′12″N 81°53′30″W
- Country: United States
- State: West Virginia
- County: Mingo
- Elevation: 889 ft (271 m)
- Time zone: UTC-5 (Eastern (EST))
  - Summer (DST): UTC-4 (EDT)
- GNIS ID: 1728790

Horsepen was an unincorporated community in Mingo County, West Virginia, United States. Their Post Office no longer exists.

== Etymology ==
The community was named for the fact Indians once corralled stolen horses near the site.
