= Lando Mines, West Virginia =

Lando Mines
- Unincorporated community
- Location within the state of West Virginia Lando Mines (the United States)
- Coordinates: 37°42′18″N 82°8′46″W
- Country: United States
- State: West Virginia
- County: Mingo
- Elevation: 833 ft (254 m)
- Time zone: UTC-5 (Eastern (EST))
  - Summer (DST): UTC-4 (EDT)
- GNIS ID: 1557460

Lando Mines is an unincorporated community in Mingo County, West Virginia, United States. Their post office closed in December 1968.
