= Hampden, West Virginia =

- Unincorporated community
- Location within West Virginia Location within the United States
- Coordinates: 37°38′22″N 81°56′55″W
- Country: United States
- State: West Virginia
- County: Mingo
- Elevation: 1,093 ft (333 m)
- Time zone: UTC-5 (Eastern (EST))
  - Summer (DST): UTC-4 (EDT)
- Area codes: 304 & 681
- GNIS feature ID: 1554632

Hampden is an unincorporated community in Mingo County, West Virginia, United States. Hampden is located on U.S. Route 52 and Horsepen Creek, 4.8 miles (7.7 km) west-northwest of Gilbert. Hampden had a post office, which closed on November 2, 2002.
