= Ragland, West Virginia =

Ragland
- Unincorporated community
- Location within the state of West Virginia Ragland (the United States)
- Coordinates: 37°42′9″N 82°7′38″W
- Country: United States
- State: West Virginia
- County: Mingo
- Time zone: UTC-5 (Eastern (EST))
  - Summer (DST): UTC-4 (EDT)
- ZIP code: 25690
- GNIS feature ID: 1545381

Ragland is an unincorporated community just outside the town of Delbarton in Mingo County in the U.S. state of West Virginia. Ragland is home to the Coal Mac mining complex and the Ragland Church of Christ.

The community most likely was named after the local Ragland family.
