= Merrimac, West Virginia =

Merrimac
- Unincorporated community
- Location within the state of West Virginia
- Coordinates: 37°38′7″N 82°12′57″W
- Country: United States
- State: West Virginia
- County: Mingo
- Elevation: 735 ft (224 m)
- Time zone: UTC-5 (Eastern (EST))
  - Summer (DST): UTC-4 (EDT)
- FIPS code: 1543132

Merrimac is an unincorporated community located in Mingo County, West Virginia, United States. Its post office is closed.

Merrimac is a name derived from a Native American language meaning "swift water".
