= Verner, West Virginia =

Verner
- Unincorporated community
- Location within the state of West Virginia Verner (the United States)
- Coordinates: 37°39′48″N 81°51′01″W
- Country: United States
- State: West Virginia
- County: Logan County, West Virginia
- Time zone: UTC-5 (Eastern (EST))
  - Summer (DST): UTC-4 (EDT)
- ZIP code: 25650
- Area codes: 304 and 681

Verner is an unincorporated community in Mingo and Logan counties in West Virginia, United States. It lies at an altitude of 781 feet (238 m).

== Etymology ==
The origin of the name Verner is obscure, but it may be derived from the surname Varner.
