= Pigeon Creek (West Virginia) =

Stream in West Virginia, U.S.

Coordinates: 37°45′0.36″N 82°13′19.49″W

Pigeon Creek is a stream in the U.S. state of West Virginia. It is a tributary of the Tug Fork.

The Burl Stafford Bridge crosses Pigeon Creek in the town of Delbarton.

== See also ==
- List of rivers of West Virginia
