= Wharncliffe, West Virginia =

- Unincorporated community
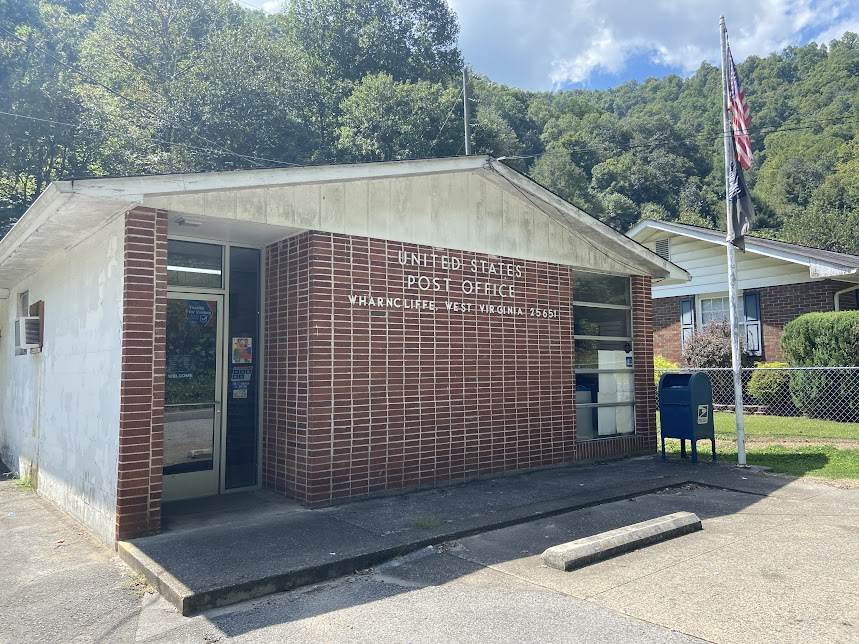
- Wharncliffe post office

- Location within West Virginia Location within the United States
- Coordinates: 37°33′19″N 81°57′56″W
- Country: United States
- State: West Virginia
- County: Mingo
- Elevation: 850 ft (260 m)
- Time zone: UTC-5 (Eastern (EST))
  - Summer (DST): UTC-4 (EDT)
- ZIP code: 25651
- Area codes: 304 & 681
- GNIS feature ID: 1548976

Wharncliffe is an unincorporated community in Mingo County, West Virginia, United States. It is 7 miles (11 km) southwest of Gilbert, and has a post office with ZIP code 25651.

The origin of the town's name is obscure. It shares its name with a village north of Sheffield in England called Wharncliffe Crags, and the associated Earls of Wharncliffe.

Wharncliffe was a stronghold for the Hatfield family in the infamous Hatfield–McCoy feud. In 1899, William "Devil Anse" Hatfield was arrested by a group of 50 men and several officials from Huntington, West Virginia, along with his son Robert Lee "Bob" Hatfield and son-in-law John Dingess.

Wharncliffe is a junction on the Norfolk Southern Railway (former Norfolk and Western) network, where the three states of Virginia, West Virginia and Kentucky meet.
