= Baisden, Mingo County, West Virginia =

Unincorporated community in West Virginia, United States

Baisden, West Virginia
- Unincorporated community
- Location within West Virginia Location within the United States
- Coordinates: 37°35′02″N 81°54′18″W
- Country: United States
- State: West Virginia
- County: Mingo
- Elevation: 1,040 ft (320 m)
- Time zone: UTC-5 (Eastern (EST))
  - Summer (DST): UTC-4 (EDT)
- ZIP code: 25608
- Area codes: 304 & 681
- GNIS feature ID: 1560591

Baisden is an unincorporated community in Mingo County, West Virginia, United States. Baisden is 3 miles (4.8 km) southwest of Gilbert. Baisden has a post office with ZIP code 25608.
