= Cabwaylingo State Forest =

State Forest in Wayne County, West Virginia

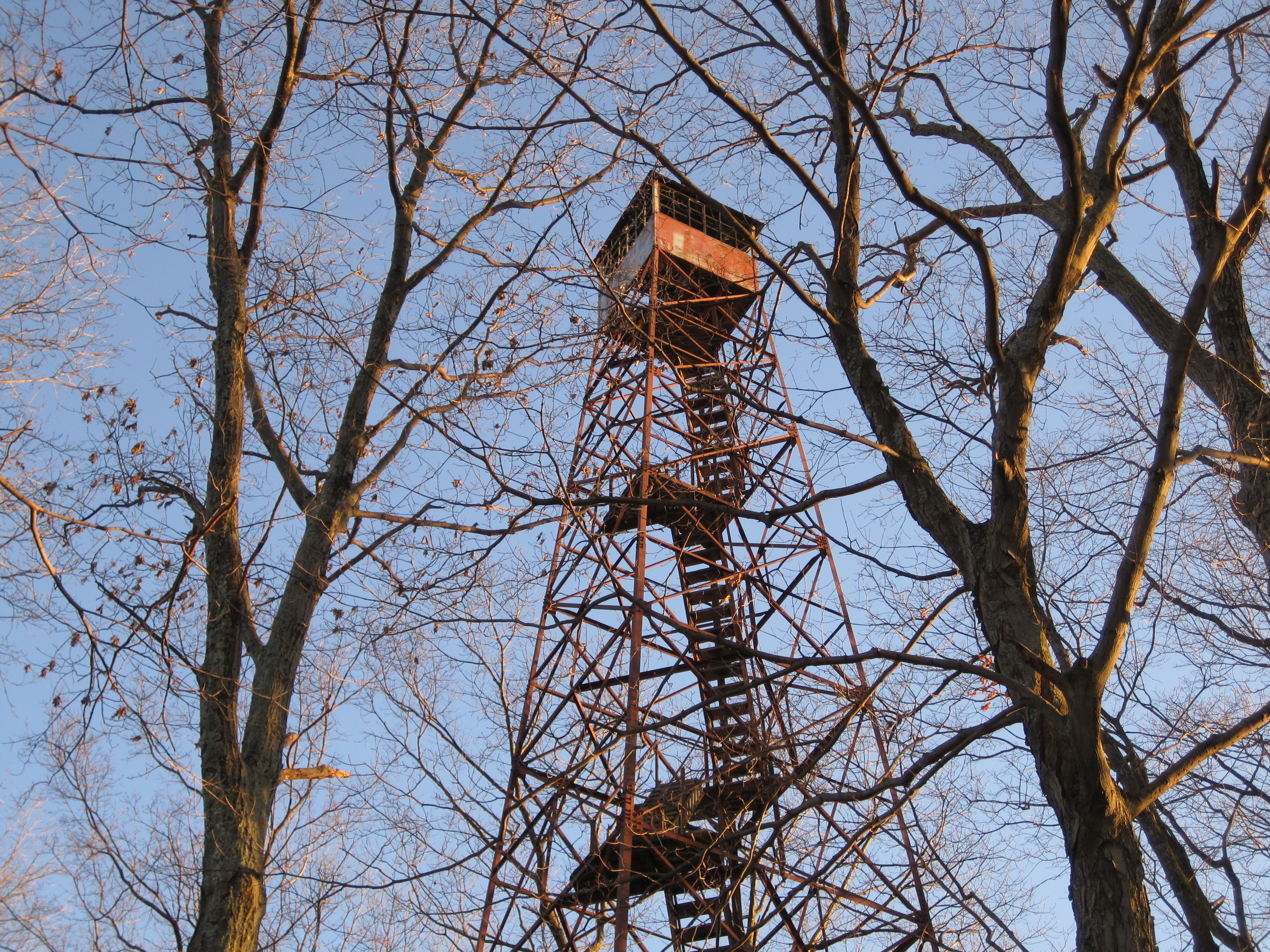
- Tick Ridge Fire Tower is located in the forest.

- Location within West Virginia
- Location: Wayne, West Virginia, United States
- Coordinates: 37°58′27″N 82°21′07″W
- Area: 8,125 acres (32.88 km^{2})
- Elevation: 994 ft (303 m)
- Named for: Surrounding counties of CABell, WAYne, LINcoln, and minGO.
- Operator: West Virginia Division of Natural Resources and West Virginia Division of Forestry
- Website: wvstateparks.com/park/cabwaylingo-state-forest/

Cabwaylingo State Forest is a 8,125-acre (3,288 ha) state forest in Wayne County, West Virginia, United States. Cabwaylingo's dense forest was restored and its facilities constructed by the Civilian Conservation Corps (CCC) throughout the 1930s and 1940s. It takes its name from the four surrounding counties: Cabell, Wayne, Lincoln, and Mingo.

The forest contains a number of projects built by the Civilian Conservation Corps during the Great Depression, including 14 guest cabins, the park headquarters, and picnic shelters. Another CCC project is the Tick Ridge Fire Tower, built in 1935, which stands as one of the few remaining fire towers in West Virginia although it is closed to the public.
