= Musick, West Virginia =

- Unincorporated community
- Location within the state of West Virginia Musick, West Virginia (the United States)
- Coordinates: 37°39′18″N 82°4′29″W
- Country: United States
- State: West Virginia
- County: Mingo
- Elevation: 1,099 ft (335 m)
- Time zone: UTC-5 (Eastern (EST))
  - Summer (DST): UTC-4 (EDT)
- GNIS ID: 1555185

Musick is an unincorporated community in Mingo County, West Virginia, United States.
