= Bias, West Virginia =

Unincorporated community in West Virginia, United States

Bias
- Unincorporated community
- Location within the state of West Virginia Bias (the United States)
- Coordinates: 37°44′28″N 82°11′41″W
- Country: United States
- State: West Virginia
- County: Mingo
- Elevation: 718 ft (219 m)
- Time zone: UTC-5 (Eastern (EST))
  - Summer (DST): UTC-4 (EDT)
- GNIS ID: 1553887

Bias is an unincorporated community in Mingo County, West Virginia, United States.

Bias most likely was named after an early settler.
