= Meador, West Virginia =

- Unincorporated community
- Location within West Virginia Location within the United States
- Coordinates: 37°37′08″N 82°03′44″W
- Country: United States
- State: West Virginia
- County: Mingo
- Elevation: 1,194 ft (364 m)
- Time zone: UTC-5 (Eastern (EST))
  - Summer (DST): UTC-4 (EDT)
- Area codes: 304 & 681
- GNIS feature ID: 1555093

Meador is an unincorporated community in Mingo County, West Virginia, United States. Meador is 5.5 miles (8.9 km) east of Matewan.

== Etymology ==
Two theories account for the origination of the community's name: (1) It is named after a settler with the surname "Meador". Ambrose Meador (died c. 1661/1663), who immigrated from England to Warrisquicke (later Isle of Wight) County, Virginia before 1636. His descendants expanded into western Virginia and southern West Virginia, as well as Texas and beyond. (2) It is a corruption of the word "meadow".
