= Myrtle, West Virginia =

- Unincorporated community
- Location within West Virginia Location within the United States
- Coordinates: 37°46′04″N 82°11′28″W
- Country: United States
- State: West Virginia
- County: Mingo
- Elevation: 722 ft (220 m)
- Time zone: UTC-5 (Eastern (EST))
  - Summer (DST): UTC-4 (EDT)
- Area codes: 304 & 681
- GNIS feature ID: 1555186

Myrtle is an unincorporated community in Mingo County, West Virginia, United States. Myrtle is located on U.S. Route 119, 8 miles (13 km) northeast of Williamson. Myrtle had a post office, which opened on September 2, 1891, and closed on August 22, 1992.
