= Burning Creek =

Stream in West Virginia, U.S.

Coordinates: 37°50′01″N 82°24′21″W

Burning Creek is a stream in the U.S. state of West Virginia.

According to GNIS, Burning Creek consists of Lower Burning Creek, Middle Burning Creek, and Upper Burning Creek. The creek was named for the naturally occurring gases which will burn when exposed to a flame.

== See also ==
- List of rivers of West Virginia
