= Lenore, West Virginia =

- Unincorporated community
- Location within West Virginia Location within the United States
- Coordinates: 37°47′56″N 82°17′13″W
- Country: United States
- State: West Virginia
- County: Mingo
- Elevation: 666 ft (203 m)
- Time zone: UTC-5 (Eastern (EST))
  - Summer (DST): UTC-4 (EDT)
- ZIP code: 25676
- Area codes: 304 & 681
- GNIS feature ID: 1541780

Lenore is an unincorporated community in Mingo County, West Virginia, United States. Lenore is located on West Virginia Route 65, 7.5 miles (12.1 km) southeast of Kermit. Lenore has a post office with the ZIP code number of 25676.
