= Delorme, West Virginia =

Unincorporated community in West Virginia, United States

- Unincorporated community
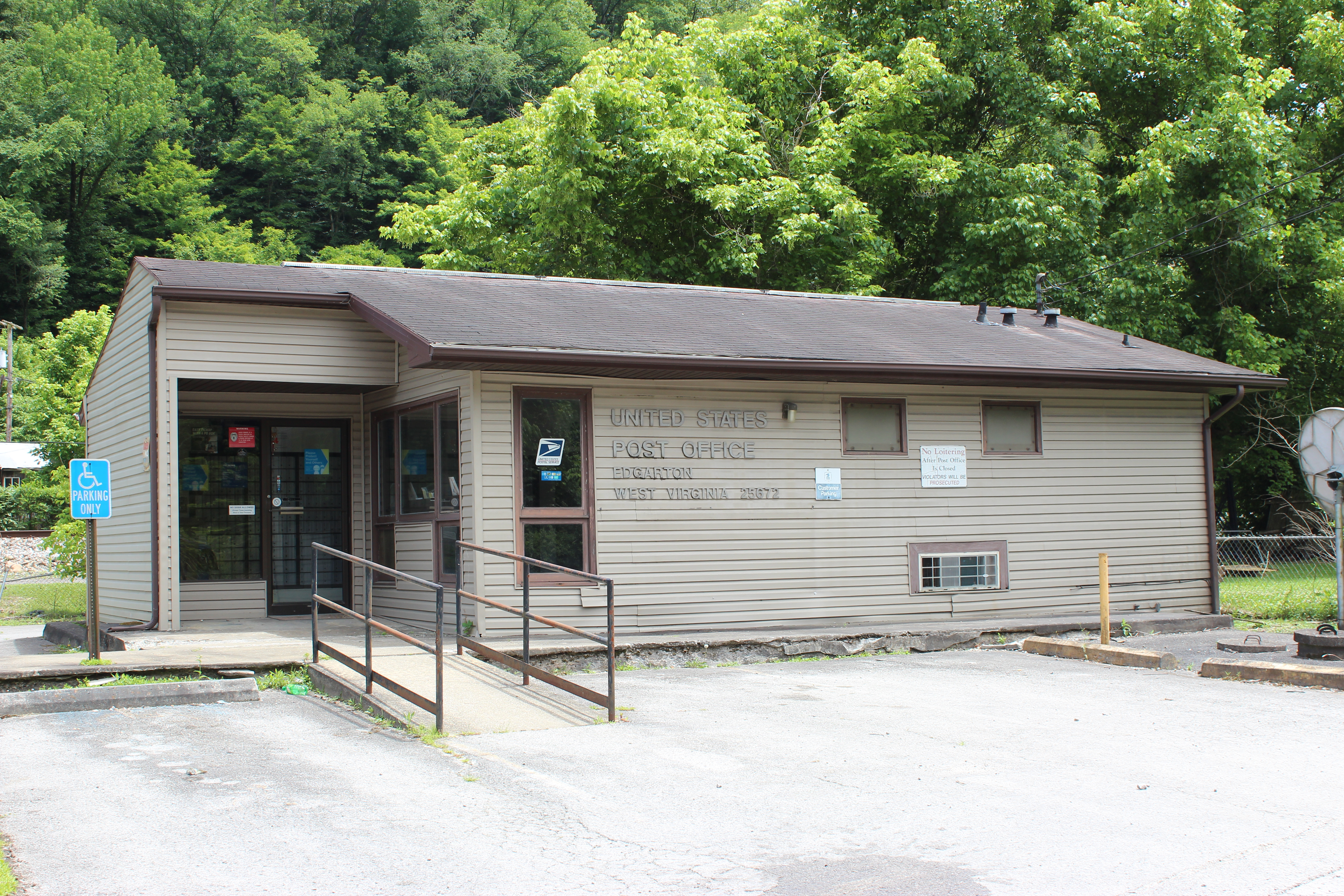
- Delorme Post Office

- Location within West Virginia Location within the United States
- Coordinates: 37°34′09″N 82°08′31″W
- Country: United States
- State: West Virginia
- County: Mingo
- Elevation: 725 ft (221 m)
- Time zone: UTC-5 (Eastern (EST))
  - Summer (DST): UTC-4 (EDT)
- Area codes: 304 & 681
- GNIS feature ID: 1538118

Delorme, also known as Edgarton, is an unincorporated community in Mingo County, West Virginia, United States. Delorme is located along the Tug Fork across from the state of Kentucky.

It was formerly served by the Norfolk and Western Railway and reportedly once had as many as seven bars.
