= Jennie Creek =

Stream in West Virginia, U.S.

Coordinates: 37°53′38″N 82°26′02″W

Jennie Creek is a stream in the U.S. state of West Virginia.

Jennie Creek was named after Jennie Wiley, a pioneer settler.

== See also ==
- List of rivers of West Virginia
