= Vulcan, West Virginia =

- Unincorporated community
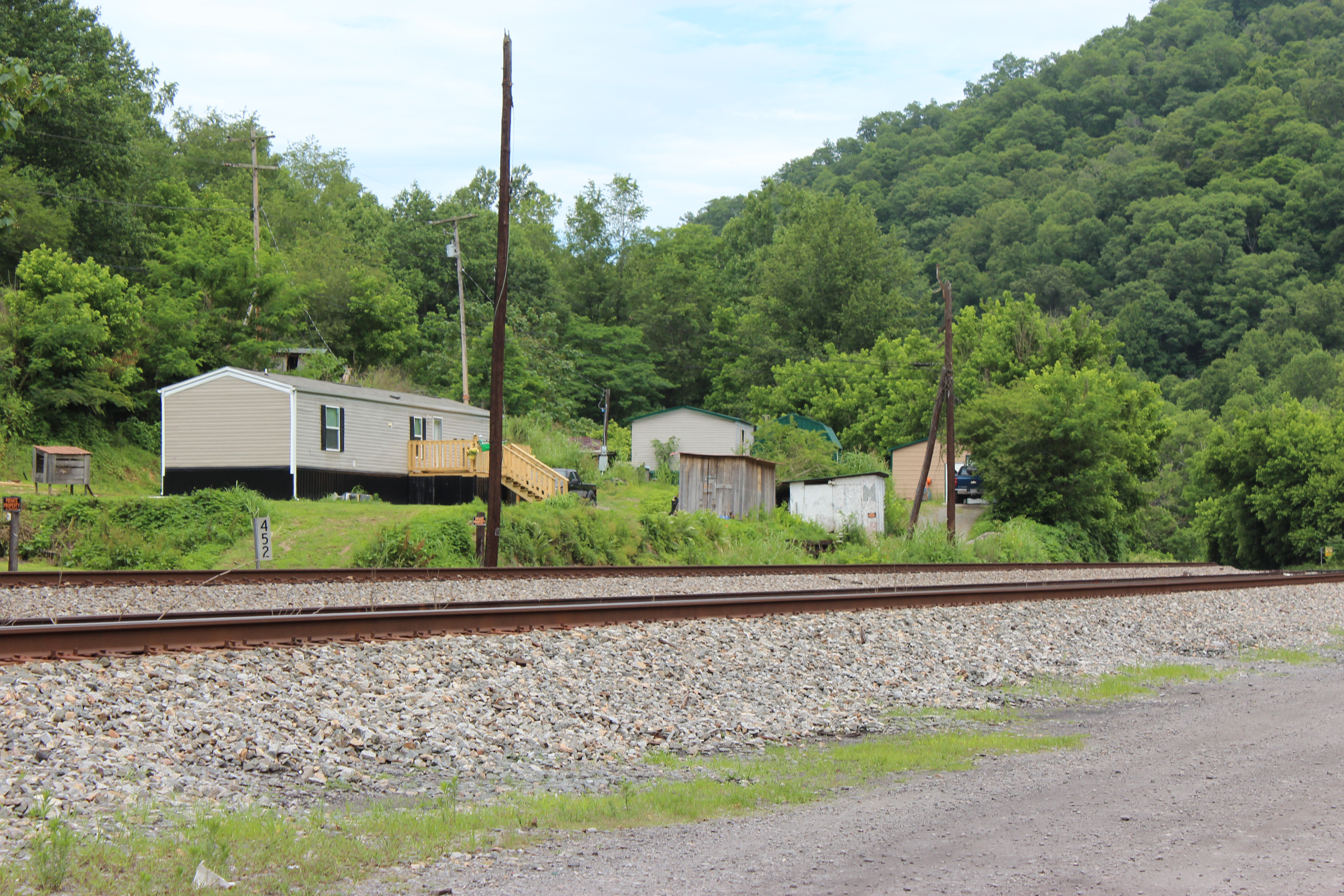
- Houses along the railroad in Vulcan

- Location within West Virginia Location within the United States
- Coordinates: 37°33′08″N 82°07′33″W
- Country: United States
- State: West Virginia
- County: Mingo
- Elevation: 738 ft (225 m)
- Time zone: UTC−5 (Eastern (EST))
  - Summer (DST): UTC−4 (EDT)
- ZIP Codes: 25697
- Area codes: 304 & 681
- GNIS feature ID: 1555899

Vulcan is an unincorporated community in Mingo County, West Virginia, United States. Vulcan is located along the Tug Fork across from the state of Kentucky. The community was named after Vulcan, the god of fire in Roman mythology. Vulcan received international attention when they requested aid from the Soviet Union to replace a collapsed bridge, the only legal entrance and exit into the community.

Vulcan was originally settled as a coal-mining community in the early 20th century, but by 1968, the coal supply had been exhausted and the town experienced significant depopulation.

== Bridge ==
Vulcan lacked a road connection to the rest of West Virginia and relied on a swinging bridge across the Tug Fork to Kentucky Route 194. The bridge was too narrow for vehicular traffic and had deteriorated by the early 1970s with missing boards.

In 1974–75, the bridge had completely collapsed due to wood rot, and the mayor of Vulcan had unsuccessfully lobbied both the state and federal government to replace it. Because of a lack of action, in 1977, the self-appointed mayor of Vulcan, John Robinette, requested foreign aid from the Soviet Union and East Germany to replace the town's bridge. Soviet journalist Iona Andronov visited Vulcan on December 17, 1977, to meet with Robinette and survey the problem. Within an hour of his visit, reporters were told that the state would replace the bridge. The West Virginia Legislature provided $1.3 million in funding to replace the bridge. The replacement was opened in 1980.

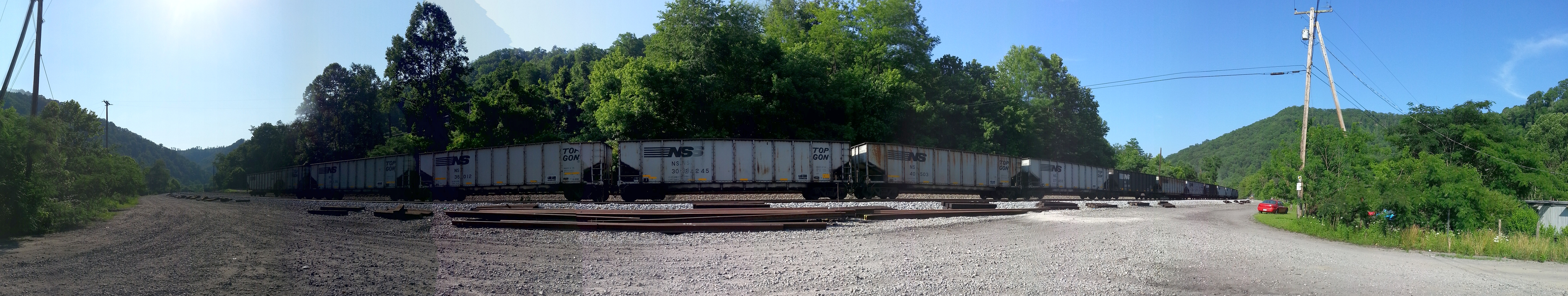
Vulcan in 2014
