= Horsepen, Virginia =

- Unincorporated community
- Location within Virginia Location within the United States
- Coordinates: 37°13′41″N 81°31′11″W
- Country: United States
- State: Virginia
- County: Tazewell
- Elevation: 1,978 ft (603 m)
- Time zone: UTC-5 (Eastern (EST))
  - Summer (DST): UTC-4 (EDT)
- ZIP code: 24619
- Area code: 276
- GNIS feature ID: 1499578

Horsepen is an unincorporated community in Tazewell County, Virginia, United States. Horsepen is located along the West Virginia state line, 5.4 miles (8.7 km) north of Tazewell, Virginia. Horsepen has a post office with ZIP code 24619.

Horsepen was first settled by Cherokee people who raided white settlers in the region; they used a natural pen in the area to hold captured horses, thereby giving the community its name. The Horsepen post office was originally in West Virginia but was later moved to the Virginia side of the border.
