= Belo, West Virginia =

Unincorporated community in West Virginia, United States

Belo
- Unincorporated community
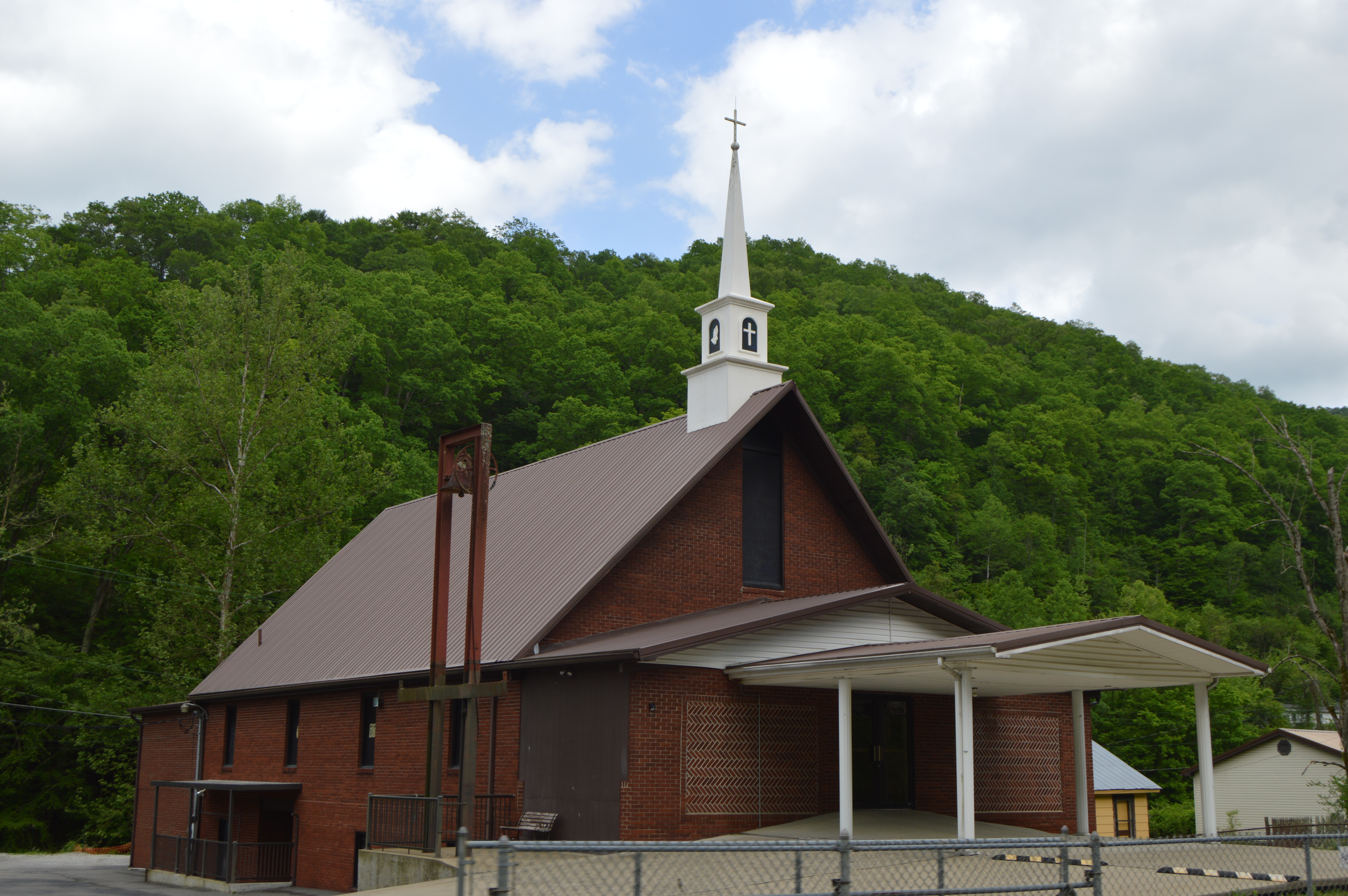
- Little Dove United Baptist Church

- Location within the state of West Virginia
- Coordinates: 37°46′27″N 82°14′15″W
- Country: United States
- State: West Virginia
- County: Mingo
- Elevation: 663 ft (202 m)
- Time zone: UTC-5 (Eastern (EST))
  - Summer (DST): UTC-4 (EDT)
- FIPS code: 1553854

Belo is an unincorporated community located in Mingo County, West Virginia, United States. Its post office is closed.

== Etymology ==
The community derives its name from one of its local businessmen, E.E. Dempsey. Mr. Dempsey owned a General Mercantile store in the community in the 1930s when the first post office in the community was being created by the Federal Government. Dempsey's wife, Lummie Vernatter Dempsey, was named as the first post-mistress. The Postal Service told Mrs. Dempsey she would need to come up with a name for the community for the post office to be certified. After trying to come up with a name Mrs. Dempsey told her husband she didn't know what to call it. He proceeded to suggest to her that since the community was "below Myrtle, below Lenore, below, Logan and below Charleston, it should be simply called "Below". The "w" was dropped when the paperwork was filed and hence the community officially became "Belo". Mr. Dempsey is generally credited with naming the community.
