= Kermit, West Virginia =

- Town
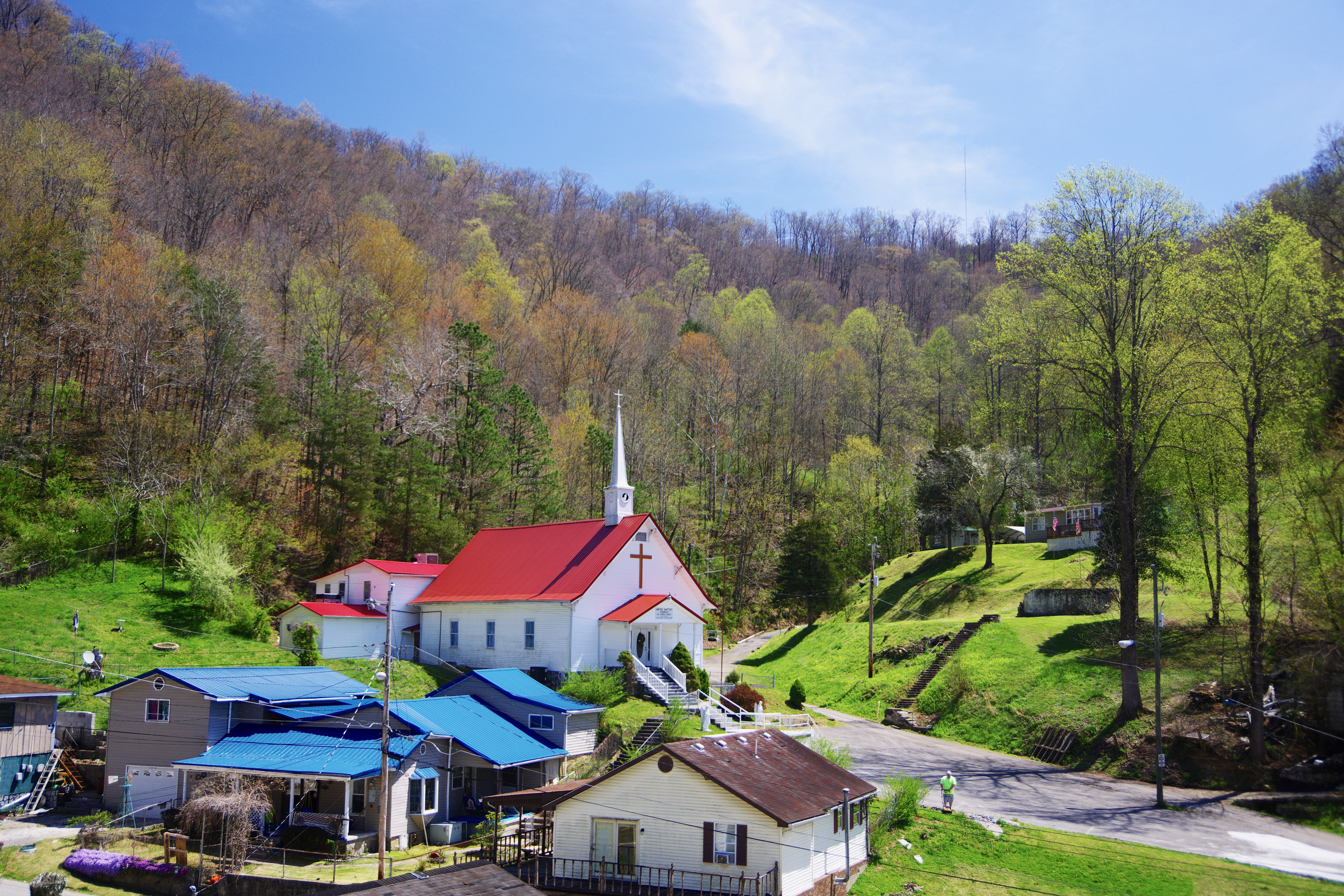

- Location of Kermit in Mingo County, West Virginia.

- Location within West Virginia Location within the United States
- Coordinates: 37°50′27″N 82°24′34″W
- Country: United States
- State: West Virginia
- County: Mingo

Area
  - Total: 0.39 sq mi (1.02 km^{2})
  - Land: 0.39 sq mi (1.02 km^{2})
  - Water: 0 sq mi (0.00 km^{2})
- Elevation: 633 ft (193 m)

Population (2020)
  - Total: 317
  - Density: 890.2/sq mi (343.71/km^{2})
- Time zone: UTC-5 (Eastern (EST))
  - Summer (DST): UTC-4 (EDT)
- ZIP code: 25674
- Area code: 304
- FIPS code: 54-43300
- GNIS feature ID: 1541162
- Website: https://local.wv.gov/kermit/Pages/default.aspx

Kermit is a town in Mingo County, West Virginia, United States. The population was 317 at the 2020 census. Kermit is located along the Tug Fork, opposite Warfield, Kentucky. The Norfolk Southern Railway's Kenova District runs through town.

The community was earlier known by the names "Lower Burning Creek", "East Warfield," and "Warfield." The name was changed to "Kermit" when a post office was established in 1906. Kermit was named for Kermit Roosevelt, son of President Theodore Roosevelt, and incorporated in 1909.

== Geography ==
Kermit is located in the northwestern corner of Mingo County at 37°50′27″N 82°24′34″W (37.840783, -82.409465). It primarily occupies bottomland along the eastern bank of the Tug Fork, opposite Warfield, Kentucky. Many of the town's primary municipal buildings and other public buildings lie in a hollow in the northeastern part of town along Main Street and High Street.

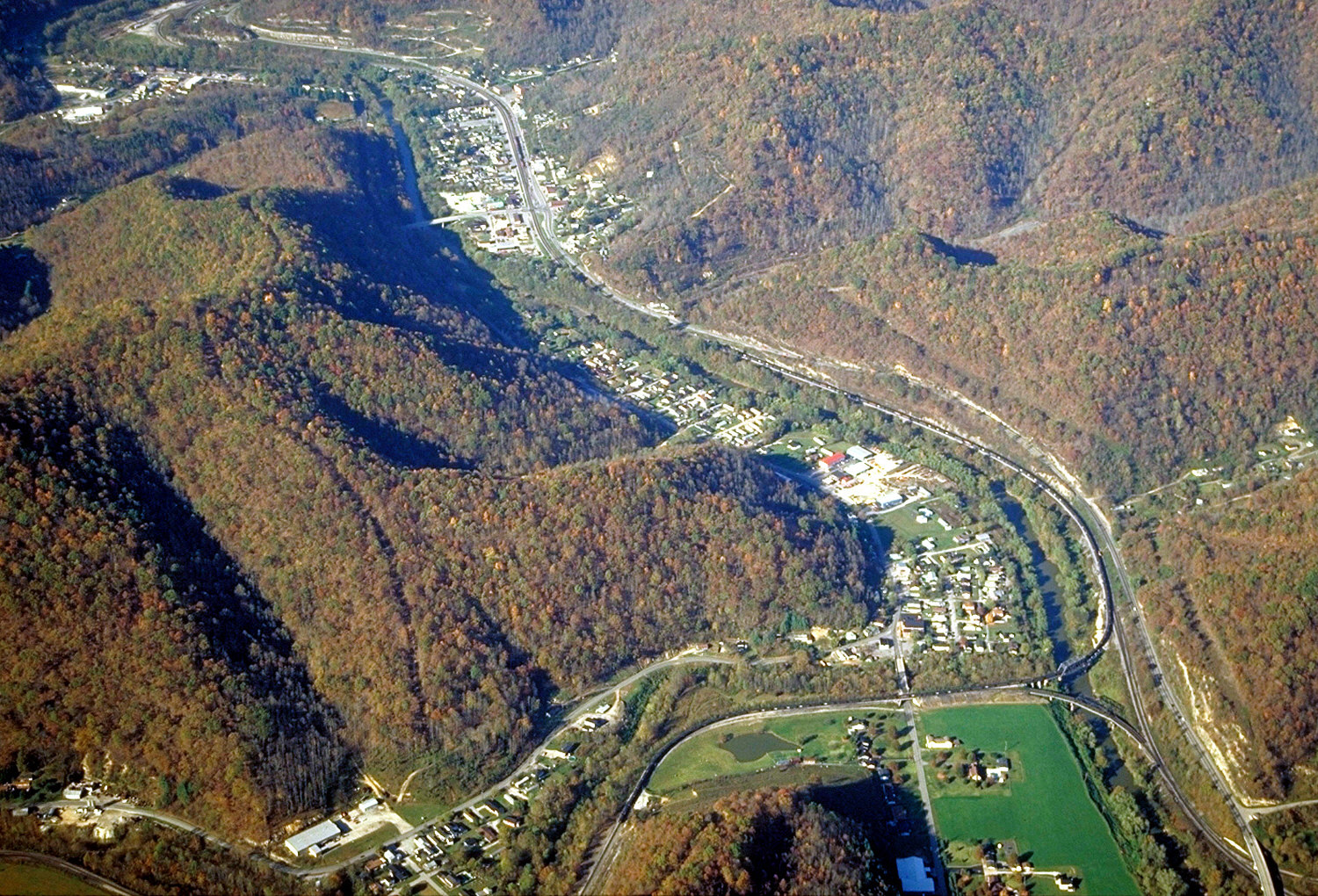
The Tug Fork Valley, with Kermit lying on the right side of the river at the top of the photo.

U.S. Route 52 (Logan Avenue) traverses Kermit, connecting the town with Williamson to the south and Kenova to the north. A vehicular and pedestrian bridge connects Kermit with Kentucky Route 292 across the Tug Fork in Warfield. The Norfolk Southern railroad tracks run roughly parallel to US-52.

According to the United States Census Bureau, the town has a total area of 0.39 square miles (1.01 km^{2}), all land.

=== Climate ===
The climate in this area is characterized by hot, humid summers and generally mild to cool winters. According to the Köppen Climate Classification system, Kermit has a humid subtropical climate, abbreviated "Cfa" on climate maps.

== Demographics ==
Historical population
Census	Pop.	Note	%±
1920	636		—
1930	740		16.4%
1940	811		9.6%
1950	964		18.9%
1960	743		−22.9%
1970	716		−3.6%
1980	705		−1.5%
1990	342		−51.5%
2000	209		−38.9%
2010	406		94.3%
2020	317		−21.9%
U.S. Decennial Census

The median income for a household in the town was $31,500, and the median income for a family was $40,000. Males had a median income of $36,250 versus $16,250 for females. The per capita income for the town was $14,695. About 4.0% of families and 10.1% of the population were below the poverty line, including 7.0% of those under the age of eighteen and 7.9% of those 65 or over.

=== 2010 census ===
As of the census of 2010, there were 406 people, 152 households, and 110 families living in the town. The population density was 1,041.0 inhabitants per square mile (401.9/km^{2}). There were 164 housing units at an average density of 420.5 per square mile (162.4/km^{2}). The racial makeup of the town was 98.8% White, 0.2% African American, 0.2% Native American, 0.2% Pacific Islander, and 0.5% from two or more races. Hispanic or Latino of any race were 1.2% of the population.

There were 152 households, of which 40.8% had children under the age of 18 living with them, 52.0% were married couples living together, 13.8% had a female householder with no husband present, 6.6% had a male householder with no wife present, and 27.6% were non-families. 24.3% of all households were made up of individuals, and 12.5% had someone living alone who was 65 years of age or older. The average household size was 2.67 and the average family size was 3.20.

The median age in the town was 37.5 years. 26.1% of residents were under the age of 18; 8.2% were between the ages of 18 and 24; 28.4% were from 25 to 44; 24.7% were from 45 to 64; and 12.8% were 65 years of age or older. The gender makeup of the town was 52.5% male and 47.5% female.

== See also ==
- Laurel Lake Wildlife Management Area
