= Delbarton, West Virginia =

- Town
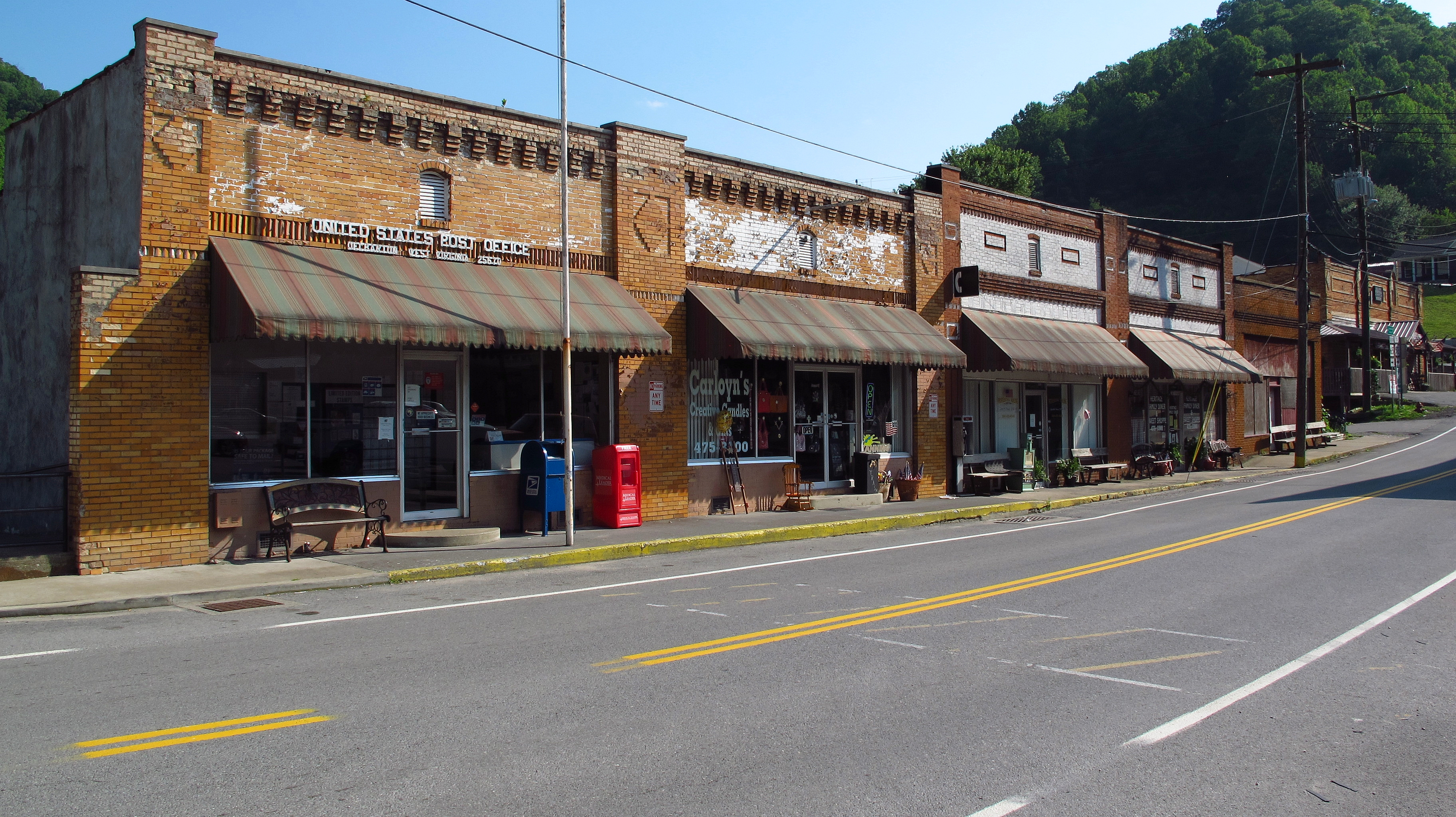
- Rockhouse Drive in Delbarton

- Seal

- Location of Delbarton in Mingo County, West Virginia.

- Location within the state of West Virginia Delbarton, West Virginia (the United States)
- Coordinates: 37°42′31″N 82°11′2″W
- Country: United States
- State: West Virginia
- County: Mingo

Area
  - Total: 1.99 sq mi (5.15 km^{2})
  - Land: 1.99 sq mi (5.15 km^{2})
  - Water: 0 sq mi (0.00 km^{2})
- Elevation: 764 ft (233 m)

Population (2020)
  - Total: 422
  - Estimate (2019): 497
  - Density: 250.1/sq mi (96.57/km^{2})
- Time zone: UTC-5 (Eastern (EST))
  - Summer (DST): UTC-4 (EDT)
- ZIP code: 25670
- Area code: 304
- FIPS code: 54-20980
- GNIS feature ID: 1538117
- Website: Town of Delbarton

Delbarton is a town in Mingo County, West Virginia, United States. The population was 522 at the 2020 census.

== History ==
Delbarton was incorporated September 6, 1946, by the Mingo County Circuit Court.

The name Delbarton comes from the New Jersey country estate of Luther Kountze, a Wall Street financier and part owner of the United Thacker Land Company, a large coal mining company. Currently a Catholic high school with the same moniker, the Delbarton School, is located on this site. The estate and town and school all derive their name from a portmanteau of syllables in the names of Kountze's three children (DELancey, BARclay and LivingsTON).

Prior to being incorporated as a town, Delbarton was a coal camp built and owned by the Thacker company. Thacker needed such camps; soon after, in 1909, acting for the company, Luther Kountze arranged the purchase of thousands of acres in the area from Jane Hatfield, a woman widowed in 1882 by the murder of her husband, Ellison Hatfield in the famed Hatfield-McCoy Feud. Jane required money for herself and her children and sold cheaply, unaware of the fantastic mineral wealth she was losing out on. After this acquisition of land, Delbarton was created for the needed miners who were recruited and brought in to work the soon to be opened coal mines.

The town is located in the heart of the richest coal area of the state, the Williamson Coalfield.

Poverty is endemic in the town of Delbarton, as it is in Mingo County where it is located. US Census Bureau estimates as of 2018 put the residents living below the poverty line percentages at 36.5% for Delbarton and 28.7% for Mingo County. These rates compare to 17.8% for West Virginia and 15% for the USA overall. Economists attribute the most significant cause of this high level of poverty to the drastic decline in the number of jobs in the local coal mining industry. The loss of such employment which has been going on for several decades is blamed on two factors: the reduction in the amount of coal being extracted in the area and the ever increasing use of less labor intensive removal methods for what coal is still mined.

Some commercial buildings in town, no longer needed for their original purposes of retail or mining administration, are now used to cater to the growing tourist industry.

== Geography ==
According to the United States Census Bureau, the town has a total area of 2.01 square miles (5.21 km^{2}), all land.

== Demographics ==
Historical population
Census	Pop.	Note	%±
1950	1,353		—
1960	1,122		−17.1%
1970	903		−19.5%
1980	981		8.6%
1990	705		−28.1%
2000	474		−32.8%
2010	579		22.2%
2020	422		−27.1%
U.S. Decennial Census

=== 2010 census ===
As of the census of 2010, there were 579 people, 260 households, and 150 families living in the town. The population density was 288.1 inhabitants per square mile (111.2/km^{2}). There were 326 housing units at an average density of 162.2 per square mile (62.6/km^{2}). The racial makeup of the town was 96.4% White, 0.7% African American, 0.2% Native American, 0.2% Asian, and 2.6% from two or more races.

There were 260 households, of which 27.7% had children under the age of 18 living with them, 43.1% were married couples living together, 10.0% had a female householder with no husband present, 4.6% had a male householder with no wife present, and 42.3% were non-families. 39.2% of all households were made up of individuals, and 11.6% had someone living alone who was 65 years of age or older. The average household size was 2.23 and the average family size was 2.99.

The median age in the town was 39.3 years. 22.1% of residents were under the age of 18; 7.2% were between the ages of 18 and 24; 29.1% were from 25 to 44; 29.8% were from 45 to 64; and 11.6% were 65 years of age or older. The gender makeup of the town was 54.1% male and 45.9% female.

=== 2000 census ===
As of the census of 2000, there were 474 people, 190 households, and 125 families living in the town. The population density was 239.8 inhabitants per square mile (92.4/km^{2}). There were 239 housing units at an average density of 120.9 per square mile (46.6/km^{2}). The racial makeup of the town was 98.31% White, 0.21% African American, 0.63% Native American, and 0.84% from two or more races. Hispanic or Latino of any race were 0.21% of the population.

There were 190 households, out of which 35.8% had children under the age of 18 living with them, 44.7% were married couples living together, 14.7% had a female householder with no husband present, and 33.7% were non-families. 31.6% of all households were made up of individuals, and 15.3% had someone living alone who was 65 years of age or older. The average household size was 2.49 and the average family size was 3.17.

In the town, the population was spread out, with 26.2% under the age of 18, 11.6% from 18 to 24, 26.8% from 25 to 44, 21.5% from 45 to 64, and 13.9% who were 65 years of age or older. The median age was 36 years. For every 100 females there were 100.8 males. For every 100 females age 18 and over, there were 93.4 males.

The median income for a household in the town was $21,875, and the median income for a family was $26,625. Males had a median income of $28,750 versus $20,250 for females. The per capita income for the town was $11,237. Although Delbarton is located in the heart of the richest coal area of West Virginia, about 30.1% of families and 34.3% of the population live below the poverty line, including 48.8% of those under age 18 and 7.1% of those age 65 or over.

== Government and politics ==
Delbarton runs on a strong mayor/city council. The mayor is elected to a four year term in partisan at the same time as United States presidential elections. The current mayor is Mont Crum, a Republican who is currently serving his first term.

List of mayors of Delbarton, West Virginia
- M. C. Kirkendall, 1946–1950
- Dr. J. R. Farley, 1951–1954
- Lewie Chapman, 1955–1956
- W. A. Curry, 1957–1958
- Melvin Steele Brooks, Sr., 1959–1960
- W. A. Curry, 1961
- Jonce Baisden, 1962–1963
- Rush B. Farley, 1964
- Paul H. Sizemore, 1965–1977
- Noah Maynard, 1978
- William “Bill” Stratton, 1979–1980
- Earl Spence, 1981–1983
- Donnie Robertson, 1984
- Earl C. Spence, Jr., 1985–1988
- William Thomas Crum, 1989–1990
- Steven Cook, 1991–1992
- Elmer R. Spence, 1993–1996
- John W. Preece, 1997–2019
- Elmer R. Spence, 2019–2023
- John W. Preece, 2023
- Mont Crum, 2023–Present

== See also ==
- Buffalo Mountain Trail
