= Mingo County, West Virginia =

County in West Virginia, United States

- County
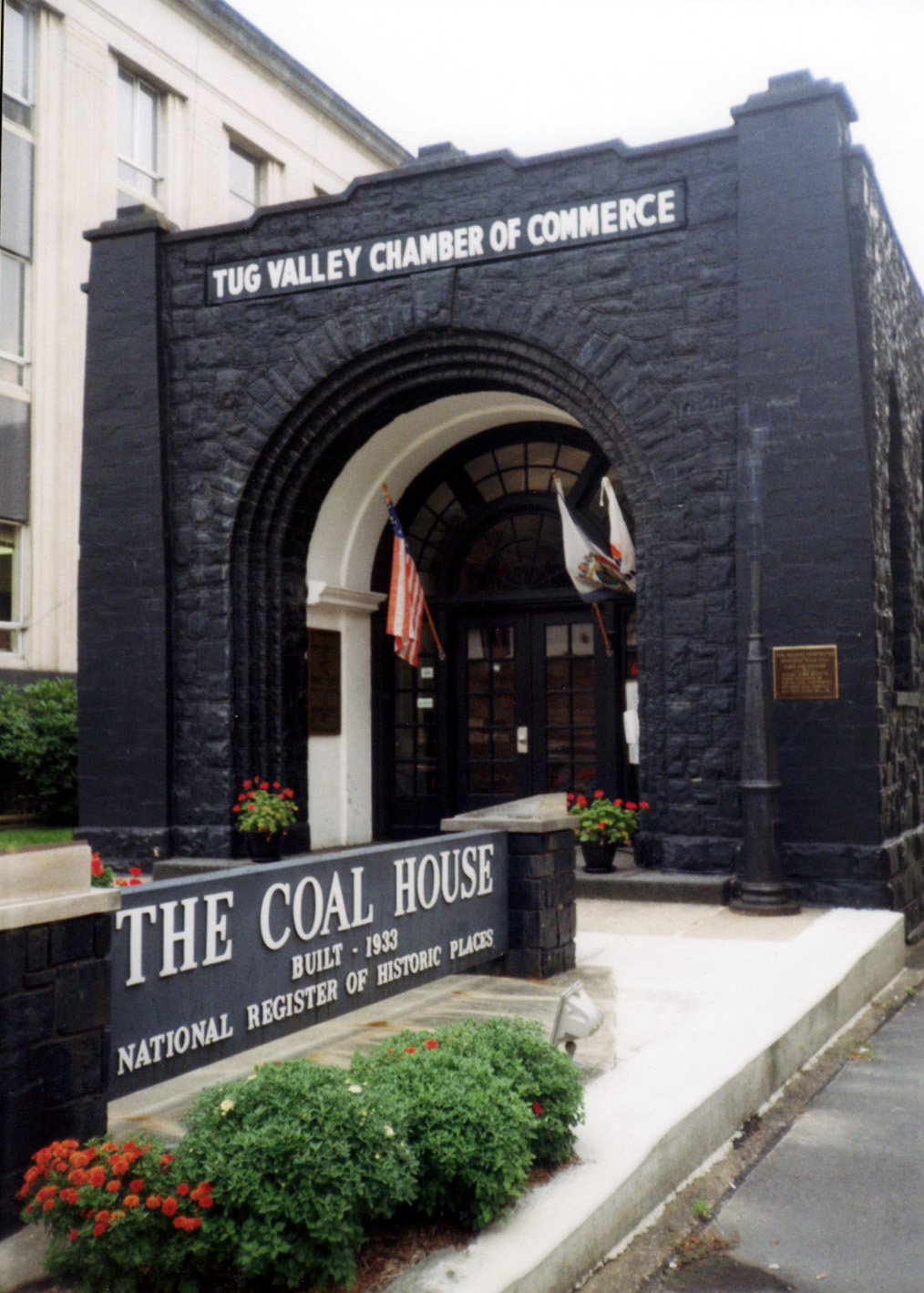
- The Coal House museum in Williamson

- Location within the U.S. state of West Virginia
- Coordinates: 37°44′N 82°08′W
- Country: United States
- State: West Virginia
- Founded: January 30, 1895
- Named for: Mingo people
- Seat: Williamson
- Largest city: Williamson

Area
  - Total: 424 sq mi (1,100 km^{2})
  - Land: 423 sq mi (1,100 km^{2})
  - Water: 0.9 sq mi (2.3 km^{2}) 0.2%

Population (2020)
  - Estimate (2025): 21,455 ▼
- Time zone: UTC−5 (Eastern)
  - Summer (DST): UTC−4 (EDT)
- Congressional district: 1st

Mingo County is a county in the U.S. state of West Virginia. As of the 2020 census, the population was 23,568. Its county seat and largest city is Williamson. Created in 1895, Mingo is West Virginia's newest county, named for the historic Iroquoian Mingo people.

== History ==
Mingo County is West Virginia's newest county, formed by an act of the state legislature in 1895 from parts of Logan County. The county was named for the Mingo Native Americans.

At the time of its creation, Mingo County was divided into magisterial districts, which the United States Census Bureau classifies as a type of non-functional subdivision serving purely administrative purposes. After West Virginia's establishment in 1863, its counties were initially divided into civil townships, with the intent to encourage local government. This proved impractical in the heavily rural state, and in 1872 the townships were converted into magisterial districts.

Mingo County's five original districts were Hardee, Harvey, Lee, Magnolia, and Stafford. As West Virginia's only county established after 1871, Mingo is unique in never having been divided into townships, but Hardee, Lee, and Magnolia districts were formerly districts in Logan County, and Hardee and Magnolia were townships until 1872.

A sixth district, Warfield, was created from part of Harvey District in 1906, followed by the formation of Williamson District from part of Lee in 1908; Williamson District was coextensive with the City of Williamson. In the 1920s, Warfield District was renamed Kermit, after its chief town. An eighth district, Tug River, was formed from part of Lee District in 1947. Mingo County was redistricted in 2005, at which time Hardee and Tug River Districts were consolidated to form Tug Hardee, and Harvey and Kermit were consolidated to form Kermit Harvey.

The attempt to unionize coal miners in the county in the 1920s led to the Battle of Blair Mountain in neighboring Logan County.

Politically, Mingo County strongly opposed former president Barack Obama. In 2008, Obama received only 8% of the vote in the Democratic primary, one of his worst performances nationwide. In 2012, Keith Russell Judd, a convicted felon who was the only other candidate on the ballot, received more Mingo County primary votes than Obama.

In 2014 Mingo County native Jeremy T. K. Farley published The Ghosts of Mingo County, based on the real-life story of Timmy Barker, a history of what Farley called "the bloodiest county in America." The book met with mixed reviews; some residents said it portrayed the county as too lawless, while others believed the book told the county's history accurately.

In 2016 Mingo County was "one of the places in America most touched by opioids."

In 2023, U.S. Senator Joe Manchin (D-WV) announced funding for a clean ammonia production facility to be placed in Mingo County, known as the Adams Fork Energy clean ammonia project. It will be the second-largest ammonia facility in the nation, producing 2 million pounds of ammonia per year.

== Geography ==
According to the United States Census Bureau, the county has a total area of 424 square miles (1,100 km^{2}), of which 423 square miles (1,100 km^{2}) is land and 0.9 square miles (2.3 km^{2}) (0.2%) is water.

=== Major highways ===
- I-73 (future)
- I-74 (future)
- U.S. Highway 52
- U.S. Highway 119
- West Virginia Route 49
- West Virginia Route 65
- West Virginia Route 80

=== Adjacent counties ===
- Lincoln County (north)
- Logan County (northeast)
- Wyoming County (east)
- McDowell County (southeast)
- Pike County, Kentucky (west)
- Martin County, Kentucky (west)
- Wayne County (northwest)
- Buchanan County, Virginia (southeast)

== Demographics ==
Historical population
Census	Pop.	Note	%±
1900	11,359		—
1910	19,431		71.1%
1920	26,384		35.8%
1930	38,319		45.2%
1940	40,802		6.5%
1950	47,409		16.2%
1960	39,742		−16.2%
1970	32,780		−17.5%
1980	37,336		13.9%
1990	33,739		−9.6%
2000	28,253		−16.3%
2010	26,839		−5.0%
2020	23,568		−12.2%
2025 (est.)	21,455	▼	−9.0%
U.S. Decennial Census; 1790–1960 1900–1990; 1990–2000 2010–2020

=== 2020 census ===
As of the 2020 census, the county had a population of 23,568. Of the residents, 20.9% were under the age of 18 and 20.3% were 65 years of age or older; the median age was 45.0 years. For every 100 females there were 96.2 males, and for every 100 females age 18 and over there were 93.9 males.

The racial makeup of the county was 95.0% White, 1.7% Black or African American, 0.2% American Indian and Alaska Native, 0.1% Asian, 0.2% from some other race, and 2.8% from two or more races. Hispanic or Latino residents of any race comprised 0.7% of the population.

There were 9,993 households in the county, of which 28.4% had children under the age of 18 living with them and 28.2% had a female householder with no spouse or partner present. About 30.6% of all households were made up of individuals and 13.6% had someone living alone who was 65 years of age or older.

There were 11,493 housing units, of which 13.1% were vacant. Among occupied housing units, 73.1% were owner-occupied and 26.9% were renter-occupied. The homeowner vacancy rate was 1.5% and the rental vacancy rate was 11.5%.

Mingo County, West Virginia – Racial and ethnic composition Note: the US Census treats Hispanic/Latino as an ethnic category. This table excludes Latinos from the racial categories and assigns them to a separate category. Hispanics/Latinos may be of any race.
Race / Ethnicity (NH = Non-Hispanic)	Pop 2000	Pop 2010	Pop 2020	% 2000	% 2010	% 2020
White alone (NH)	27,134	25,944	22,293	96.04%	96.67%	94.59%
Black or African American alone (NH)	654	471	405	2.32%	1.75%	1.72%
Native American or Alaska Native alone (NH)	63	18	33	0.22%	0.07%	0.14%
Asian alone (NH)	52	43	32	0.18%	0.16%	0.14%
Pacific Islander alone (NH)	5	0	0	0.02%	0.00%	0.00%
Other race alone (NH)	9	5	33	0.03%	0.02%	0.14%
Mixed race or Multiracial (NH)	201	239	608	0.71%	0.89%	2.58%
Hispanic or Latino (any race)	135	119	164	0.48%	0.44%	0.70%
Total	28,253	26,839	23,568	100.00%	100.00%	100.00%

=== 2010 census ===
As of the 2010 United States census, there were 26,839 people, 11,125 households, and 7,707 families living in the county. The population density was 63.4 inhabitants per square mile (24.5/km^{2}). There were 12,699 housing units at an average density of 30.0 per square mile (11.6/km^{2}). The racial makeup of the county was 97.1% white, 1.8% black or African American, 0.2% Asian, 0.1% American Indian, 0.0% from other races, and 0.9% from two or more races. Those of Hispanic or Latino origin made up 0.4% of the population. In terms of ancestry, 12.6% were Irish, 11.9% were American, 7.0% were German, and 6.9% were English.

Of the 11,125 households, 30.8% had children under the age of 18 living with them, 52.6% were married couples living together, 11.8% had a female householder with no husband present, 30.7% were non-families, and 27.7% of all households were made up of individuals. The average household size was 2.40 and the average family size was 2.91. The median age was 40.9 years.

The median income for a household in the county was $32,902 and the median income for a family was $40,199. Males had a median income of $46,917 versus $27,168 for females. The per capita income for the county was $17,629. About 16.9% of families and 21.6% of the population were below the poverty line, including 30.1% of those under age 18 and 10.8% of those age 65 or over.

=== 2000 census ===
As of the census of 2000, there were 28,253 people, 11,303 households, and 8,217 families living in the county. The population density was 67 people per square mile (26 people/km^{2}). There were 12,898 housing units at an average density of 30 per square mile (12/km^{2}). The racial makeup of the county was 96.39% White, 2.34% Black or African American, 0.24% Native American, 0.21% Asian, 0.02% Pacific Islander, 0.06% from other races, and 0.74% from two or more races. 0.48% of the population were Hispanic or Latino of any race.

There were 11,303 households, out of which 33.50% had children under the age of 18 living with them, 56.20% were married couples living together, 12.70% had a female householder with no husband present, and 27.30% were non-families. 25.20% of all households were made up of individuals, and 10.40% had someone living alone who was 65 years of age or older. The average household size was 2.49 and the average family size was 2.98.

In the county, the population was spread out, with 24.20% under the age of 18, 9.20% from 18 to 24, 29.10% from 25 to 44, 25.00% from 45 to 64, and 12.40% who were 65 years of age or older. The median age was 37 years. For every 100 females there were 93.70 males. For every 100 females age 18 and over, there were 90.20 males.

The median income for a household in the county was $21,347, and the median income for a family was $26,581. Males had a median income of $31,660 versus $18,038 for females. The per capita income for the county was $12,445. About 25.90% of families and 29.70% of the population were below the poverty line, including 38.90% of those under age 18 and 18.60% of those age 65 or over.

== Politics ==
The youngest of West Virginia's 55 counties, Mingo County was created from deeply secessionist Logan County. Consequently, for the 110 years following its creation, Mingo County was staunchly Democratic, voting for Walter Mondale—who came within 3,819 votes of losing all 50 states—by a two-to-one margin in 1984, and voting Republican only for William Howard Taft in 1908, Herbert Hoover in 1928 due to widespread anti-Catholic sentiment against Al Smith, and Richard Nixon against the left-wing George McGovern in 1972. Like all of West Virginia, since 2000 a combination of declining unionization and differences with the Democratic Party's liberal views on social and environmental issues has produced a dramatic swing to the Republican Party. Mingo County last backed a Democratic presidential nominee in 2004, when John Kerry carried the county by 13 percentage points despite losing the national election and popular vote. In 2020, Democrat Joe Biden lost the county by more than 70 percentage points to Republican Donald Trump despite winning the presidential election. In 2024, Mingo County was the second-most Republican county in the state, behind only arch-Republican Grant County.

In state elections, Mingo County remained very Democratic up until the mid-2010s. In the 2018 U.S. Senate election, Democrat Joe Manchin lost Mingo County despite winning statewide. Nonetheless, Democrats enjoy a 2-to-1 advantage in party registration as of October 2023.

United States presidential election results for Mingo County, West Virginia
Year	Republican		Democratic		Third party(ies)	
Year	No.	%	No.	%	No.	%
1896	632	34.33%	1,204	65.40%	5	0.27%
1900	838	38.07%	1,363	61.93%	0	0.00%
1904	1,607	49.08%	1,652	50.46%	15	0.46%
1908	2,058	57.23%	1,520	42.27%	18	0.50%
1912	1,569	36.01%	1,832	42.05%	956	21.94%
1916	2,223	47.25%	2,472	52.54%	10	0.21%
1920	3,972	44.60%	4,934	55.40%	0	0.00%
1924	4,656	42.06%	5,313	47.99%	1,101	9.95%
1928	6,904	50.28%	6,801	49.53%	27	0.20%
1932	7,801	47.28%	8,657	52.46%	43	0.26%
1936	5,771	33.82%	11,278	66.09%	15	0.09%
1940	5,776	33.20%	11,619	66.80%	0	0.00%
1944	4,711	33.03%	9,550	66.97%	0	0.00%
1948	4,896	32.02%	10,362	67.76%	34	0.22%
1952	6,852	34.77%	12,856	65.23%	0	0.00%
1956	7,916	44.15%	10,014	55.85%	0	0.00%
1960	4,903	30.34%	11,259	69.66%	0	0.00%
1964	3,154	20.45%	12,266	79.55%	0	0.00%
1968	3,988	28.90%	8,677	62.89%	1,133	8.21%
1972	7,484	57.27%	5,585	42.73%	0	0.00%
1976	3,010	25.80%	8,655	74.20%	0	0.00%
1980	3,716	27.98%	9,328	70.24%	236	1.78%
1984	4,275	33.59%	8,434	66.27%	17	0.13%
1988	2,896	27.98%	7,429	71.78%	25	0.24%
1992	2,584	23.77%	7,342	67.53%	947	8.71%
1996	2,229	20.50%	7,584	69.74%	1,062	9.77%
2000	3,866	38.49%	6,049	60.23%	128	1.27%
2004	4,612	43.28%	5,983	56.15%	60	0.56%
2008	4,587	55.01%	3,582	42.96%	169	2.03%
2012	6,191	69.92%	2,428	27.42%	236	2.67%
2016	7,911	83.17%	1,370	14.40%	231	2.43%
2020	8,544	85.22%	1,397	13.93%	85	0.85%
2024	7,325	86.28%	1,061	12.50%	104	1.22%

== Communities ==
=== City ===
- Williamson (county seat)

=== Towns ===
- Delbarton
- Gilbert
- Kermit
- Matewan

=== Magisterial districts ===
- Beech Ben Mate
- Kermit Harvey
- Lee
- Magnolia
- Stafford
- Tug Hardee
- Williamson

=== Historical magisterial districts ===
- Hardee
- Harvey
- Kermit
- Tug River

=== Census-designated places ===
- Chattaroy
- Gilbert Creek
- Justice
- Red Jacket

=== Unincorporated communities ===
- Ajax
- Baisden
- Belo
- Bias
- Blackberry City
- Borderland
- Breeden
- Delorme
- Dingess
- East Kermit
- Hampden
- Isaban (part)
- Kirk
- Lando Mines
- Lenore
- Lobata
- Meador
- Merrimac
- Musick
- Myrtle
- Naugatuck
- Newtown
- Nolan
- Pie
- Ragland
- Rawl
- Sprigg
- Taylorville
- Varney
- Verner (part)
- Vulcan
- Wharncliffe
- Wyoming City (part)

== Education ==
Mingo County is served by the Mingo County School District.

== Notable people ==
- Don Blankenship — former president and CEO of Massey Energy, 2018 Senate candidate
- Charles Blevins, a West Virginia folk music artist and the owner of Red Robin Inn, in Borderland, West Virginia.
- H. Truman Chafin — former and longest-serving state senator
- Doc Edwards — former Major League Baseball catcher and manager
- Robert H. "Doc" Foglesong — four-star general in the United States Air Force, president of Mississippi State University from 2006 to 2008
- James H. "Buck" Harless — timber and coal operator, former president and CEO of International Industries
- Sid Hatfield — Matewan chief of police and hero of the Battle of Matewan, murdered by Baldwin-Felts detectives
- Anse Hatfield — patriarch of Hatfield family involved in Hatfield–McCoy feud

== See also ==
- Coal camps in Mingo County, West Virginia
- Elk Creek Wildlife Management Area
- Laurel Lake Wildlife Management Area
- National Register of Historic Places listings in Mingo County, West Virginia
- West Virginia Mine Wars Museum
