= Tug Fork =

River in the Eastern United States

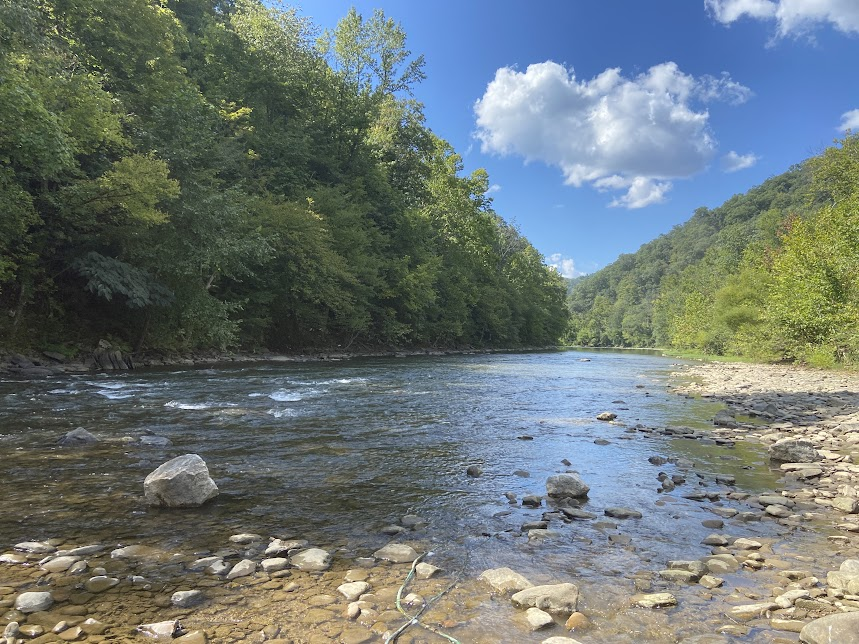
- Tug Fork seen southeast of Matewan, West Virginia

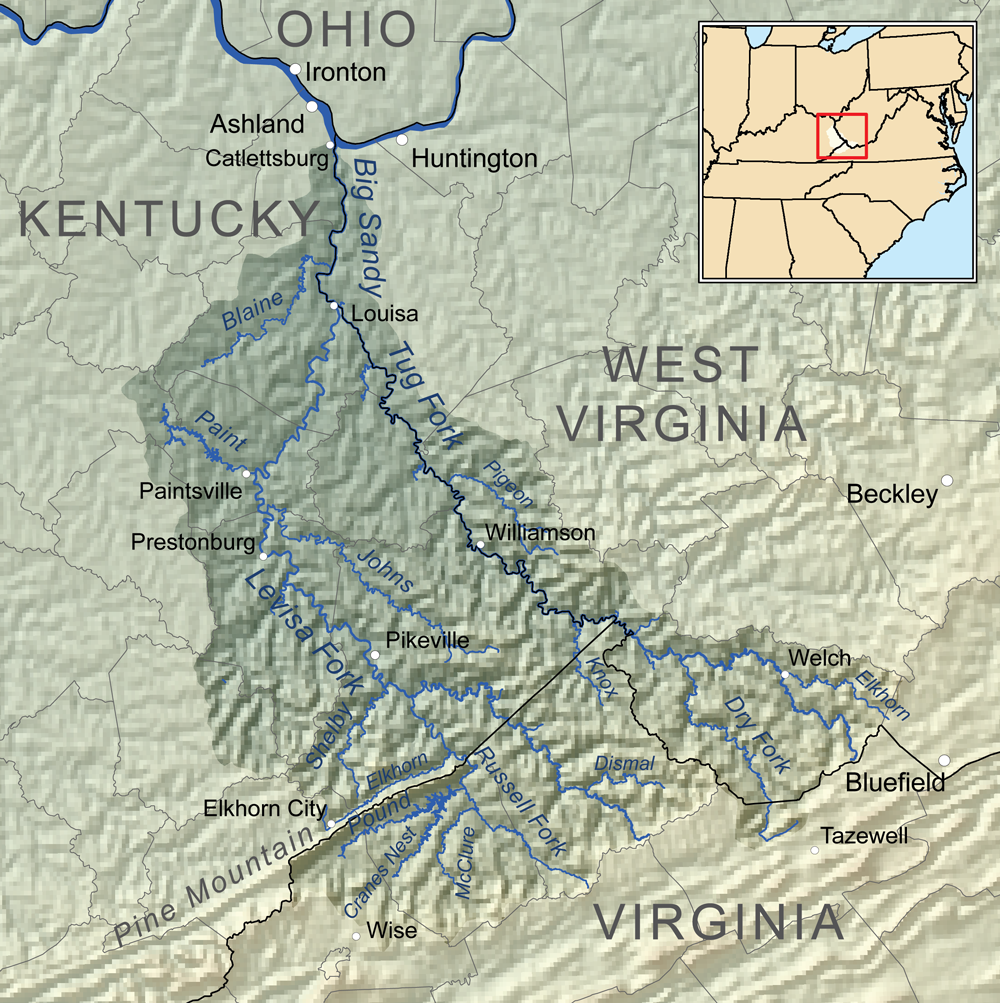
- Map of the Big Sandy River watershed, with its Levisa Fork (left) and Tug Fork (right) tributaries shown

Location
- Country: United States
- State: Kentucky, Virginia, West Virginia
- Counties: McDowell WV, Buchanan VA, Pike KY, Mingo WV, Martin KY, Lawrence KY, Wayne WV

Physical characteristics
- Source: Big Stone Ridge
  - location: McDowell County, West Virginia
  - coordinates: 37°16′38″N 81°26′06″W
  - elevation: 2,604 ft (794 m)
- Mouth: Big Sandy River
  - location: Louisa, Kentucky
  - coordinates: 38°07′05″N 82°36′06″W
  - elevation: 545 ft (166 m)
- Length: 159 mi (256 km)
- Discharge
  - location: Kermit, West Virginia
  - average: 1,457 cu ft/s (41.3 m^{3}/s)
  - minimum: 14 cu ft/s (0.40 m^{3}/s)
  - maximum: 35,400 cu ft/s (1,000 m^{3}/s)

Basin features
- Tributaries
  - left: Big Creek, Dry Fork, Panther Creek, Peter Creek, Pond Creek, Turkey Creek, Kentucky
  - right: Elkhorn Creek, Mate Creek, Pigeon Creek, Marrowbone Creek, Jennie Creek, Aflex, Kentucky, Burnwell, Kentucky

The Tug Fork is a tributary of the Big Sandy River, 159 miles (256 km) long, in southwestern West Virginia, southwestern Virginia, and eastern Kentucky in the United States. Via the Big Sandy and Ohio rivers, it is part of the watershed of the Mississippi River.

It is also known as the Tug Fork River or the Tug River. The United States Board on Geographic Names settled on "Tug Fork" as the stream's official name in 1975.

The Tug Fork rises in the Appalachian Mountains of extreme southwestern West Virginia, in southern McDowell County, near the Virginia state line. It flows in a meandering course through the mountains generally northwest, past Welch. Approximately 20 miles (32 km) northwest of Welch, it briefly forms approximately 4 miles (6 km) of the state line between West Virginia (northeast) and Virginia (southwest). For the remainder of its course it forms part of the boundary between West Virginia (east) and Kentucky (west), flowing northwest past Williamson, West Virginia. It joins the Levisa Fork at Louisa, Kentucky to form the Big Sandy.

The river flows through an especially remote mountainous region in its upper course. The river valley between Pike County, Kentucky and Mingo County, West Virginia was the scene of the infamous Hatfield–McCoy feud in the late 19th century.

Toponymist George R. Stewart writes about the origin of the name "Tug Fork". In 1756 a small army of Virginians and Cherokees conducted the Sandy Creek Expedition against the Shawnee. At one point they killed and ate two buffaloes and hung their hides on a tree. Later they returned and, being out of provisions, took the hides and cut them into thin strips called "tugs". These they roasted and ate. For this reason, the story goes, the stream was given the name "Tug." Stewart also points out another possible origin. Even if the story is true, the second explanation may have reinforced the name. In the Cherokee language "tugulu" refers to the forks of a stream, as in the Tugaloo River and other streams in former Cherokee lands named "tug".

== See also ==
- List of Kentucky rivers
- List of Virginia rivers
- List of West Virginia rivers
- River borders of U.S. states
- Martin County Sludge Spill
