= Charles Lively (labor spy) =

American labor spy (1887–1962)

Charles Everett Lively (March 6, 1887 – May 28, 1962) was an American private detective who worked as a labor spy for the Baldwin–Felts Detective Agency. He played an active role in the Coal Wars in Appalachia and Colorado during the early 20th century.

Lively spied on the United Mine Workers of America in West Virginia and five other states, sometimes while working as a coal miner. After fatally shooting a striking miner during the Colorado Coalfield War, Lively spent several years working for Baldwin–Felts in the Great Plains before his assignment in Matewan, West Virginia.

Lively was so successful posing as a UMWA activist that he became a union delegate and was once photographed with Mother Jones. His cover was abandoned in the wake of the Battle of Matewan in May 1920, in which seven Baldwin–Felts detectives were killed. The following year, Lively and another Baldwin–Felts operative killed Sid Hatfield, Matewan's pro-union police chief, and his associate Edward Chambers, evidently at the behest of the detective agency. Lively successfully claimed self-defense in the double homicide. His participation in three killings, with scant consequences, cemented his reputation as one of the most violent opponents of efforts to unionize the coal fields. He has been called "the deadliest man in the West Virginia-Colorado coal mine wars".

== Early career ==
=== West Virginia ===
Lively was born on March 6, 1887, in Spring Hill, West Virginia, one of 11 children born to James Joseph Lively and Amelia Parsons. His father was a farmer who struggled to make a living, and his mother was illiterate. The 1900 census shows his name as "Everett Lively", and it is unclear if his birth name was "Charles". It is possible that name was added as an alias after he began work undercover in the coal fields. He then began calling himself "Charles Everett Lively" by 1940.

Lively began working as a coal miner at the age of 13, doing "most anything about a mine—loading coal, running a machine". As a youth he was "friendly and persuasive", and became close to Fred Mooney, a future leader of District 17 of the United Mine Workers of America.

Lively joined the United Mine Workers of America in Kanawha County, West Virginia, in 1902, and remained in the union even after his work began with the Baldwin–Felts Detective Agency. He testified before Congress that he joined the detective agency in late 1912 or early 1913 in Fayette County, West Virginia. However, the 1910 census indicates that he was in El Paso County, Colorado, working in coal mines there. Since miners had little mobility at the time due to their poverty, it is entirely possible that he began work with Baldwin-Felts two years earlier than stated in his testimony. Newspaper accounts indicate that Lively obtained employment in Colorado at the Pike's View mine in 1910, and was seriously injured there.

In 1913, he attended a UMWA convention as a delegate, representing the local in Gatewood, West Virginia. In addition to his mining pay, his initial salary from Baldwin-Felts was $75 a month plus expenses.

=== Colorado ===
Sometime after 1910, Lively became active in the Western Federation of Miners, initially as a union organizer before becoming its president. After returning to West Virginia, he was sent to Huerfano County, Colorado, assigned to infiltrate the UMWA local in La Veta, Colorado, and investigate a murder committed by union men. He did so successfully, using the name Everett Lively, and became vice-president of the local while working as a detective. He obtained evidence that led to the murder arrest of Jonathan Flockheart, who was secretary of the local.

In 1914, during the Colorado Coalfield War, Lively fatally shot a striking miner, a Swedish immigrant named Swan Oleen, in a saloon in La Veta. Lively claimed that the shooting was in self-defense. According to his biographer R.G. Yoho, it is likely that Lively killed Oleen deliberately, perhaps because of Oleen's union activities, and that he did so in order to infiltrate the Huerfano County jail. While in jail, as Everett Lively, he gathered information on union activities for the detective agency. At the behest of Albert Felts, co-owner of the agency, Lively's stay in the jail was extended to 16 months for information-gathering purposes. Lively's activities in the jail were likely conducted with the knowledge of the county sheriff, who was anti-union. Lively subsequently pleaded guilty to involuntary manslaughter and was sentenced to ten days in jail, with credit for time served. He was freed and ordered to leave Colorado, a decision that was necessary for his protection after the union became aware that he was a spy.

After leaving Colorado in 1915, he worked for Baldwin-Felts in Missouri for about a year, and then was assigned to Oklahoma, Kansas and Illinois, where he was located in 1917. His work in those regions is not known due to destruction of the agency's records in future years.

== Union infiltration in Matewan ==
Lively returned to West Virginia in January or February 1920. Posing as a coal miner, he investigated the robbery of a company store and the burning of coal mining equipment. While engaged in those probes, Lively became known as a union sympathizer, for which he was fired. This firing only enhanced his reputation with union coal miners. After his firing, he was assigned to Williamson, Merrimac and then to Matewan in Mingo County, West Virginia, a scene of labor unrest, drawing a salary of $225 a month plus expenses from Baldwin-Felts. In West Virginia he became an active member of the union, and became involved in organizing meetings, swearing in new members and planning strategies. At one point he posed with a photo that included other union activists and Mother Jones. He became widely viewed by union members as a future union leader.

Lively became the operator of a restaurant in Matewan just beneath the UMWA office. His restaurant became a popular hangout for union miners. Lively has testified that he began operating the restaurant after the Battle of Matewan, a gun battle on May 19, 1920, which pitted local Mingo County coal miners and their allies against Baldwin-Felts agents. Other accounts indicate that he was running the restaurant three weeks before the gunfight and continued to operate it until February 1921, when he was called to witness at a trial stemming from the battle. Lively was in Charleston, West Virginia, at UMWA headquarters at the time of the battle, in which ten men were killed, including seven Baldwin-Felts operatives and several others were wounded. Among the dead were the brothers Albert and Lee Felts, brothers of the agency's co-owner Thomas Felts, and the pro-union Mayor Cabell Testerman. The town's pro-union sheriff, Sid Hatfield, was involved in the gunfight.

Subsequent to the gunfight, Lively's restaurant, which was on the east end of Matewan, became a meeting place for both sides of the conflict. It became a "rendezvous for strikers" who "repeatedly detailed to him" how they planned the shootings of Baldwin-Felts personnel in the battle. According to Yoho, personal records indicate that by then it was clear that Thomas Felts wanted Hatfield dead. Thomas Felts accused Hatfield of killing his brother Albert and publicly stated that he wanted to see him hanged. Lively was now instructed to cultivate friendships with the union participants in the gunfight, and obtain information that would lead to the conviction and execution of Hatfield and the others who were involved in the killing of the Felts brothers. After the gunfight, Lively helped plan violent actions planned by union men, and was so trusted that he became a bodyguard for Mother Jones and other union officials. Lively was among several Baldwin-Felts men who infiltrated the union to obtain information on the Battle of Matewan, but was the only one who was publicly identified.

Hatfield and 22 other defendants were put on trial in February 1921 for the murder of Albert Felts, with other trials planned for the future. In the runup to the trial, the coal operators offered $1,000 to any of the defendants willing to switch sides and testify for the prosecution. Prosecutors agreed to drop charges against any defendant who did so. Lively helped persuade one defendant, Isaac Brewer, to do so, plying him with alcohol and meals at his restaurant. Brewer's testimony, however, was ultimately ineffective.

Lively was called to testify as the state's star witness even though he did not directly witness the gun battle, and could only speak of things he had heard. He testified that Hatfield killed Testerman because of a desire to court his wife, who he later married, and because Testerman was getting too close to the coal operators. The defense countered that it was absurd that Hatfield would engage in a gun battle with heavily armed men with that as a motive. The defendants were acquitted. Lively's career as a labor spy ended and he never returned to Matewan. He took no precautions to shield his family from the possible wrath of the miners. After the trial, Lively was expelled from the union for 99 years.

In July 1921, Lively was called to testify before the United States Senate, where he was sternly questioned by Sen. Kenneth McKellar of Tennessee regarding the practice of agencies infiltrating union organizers. McKellar denounced the practice of detectives infiltrating unions, saying it was "not right." In response to questioning, Lively said that if the union members knew he was a detective they would have "turned me over to an undertaker."

=== Killing of Sid Hatfield and Edward Chambers ===
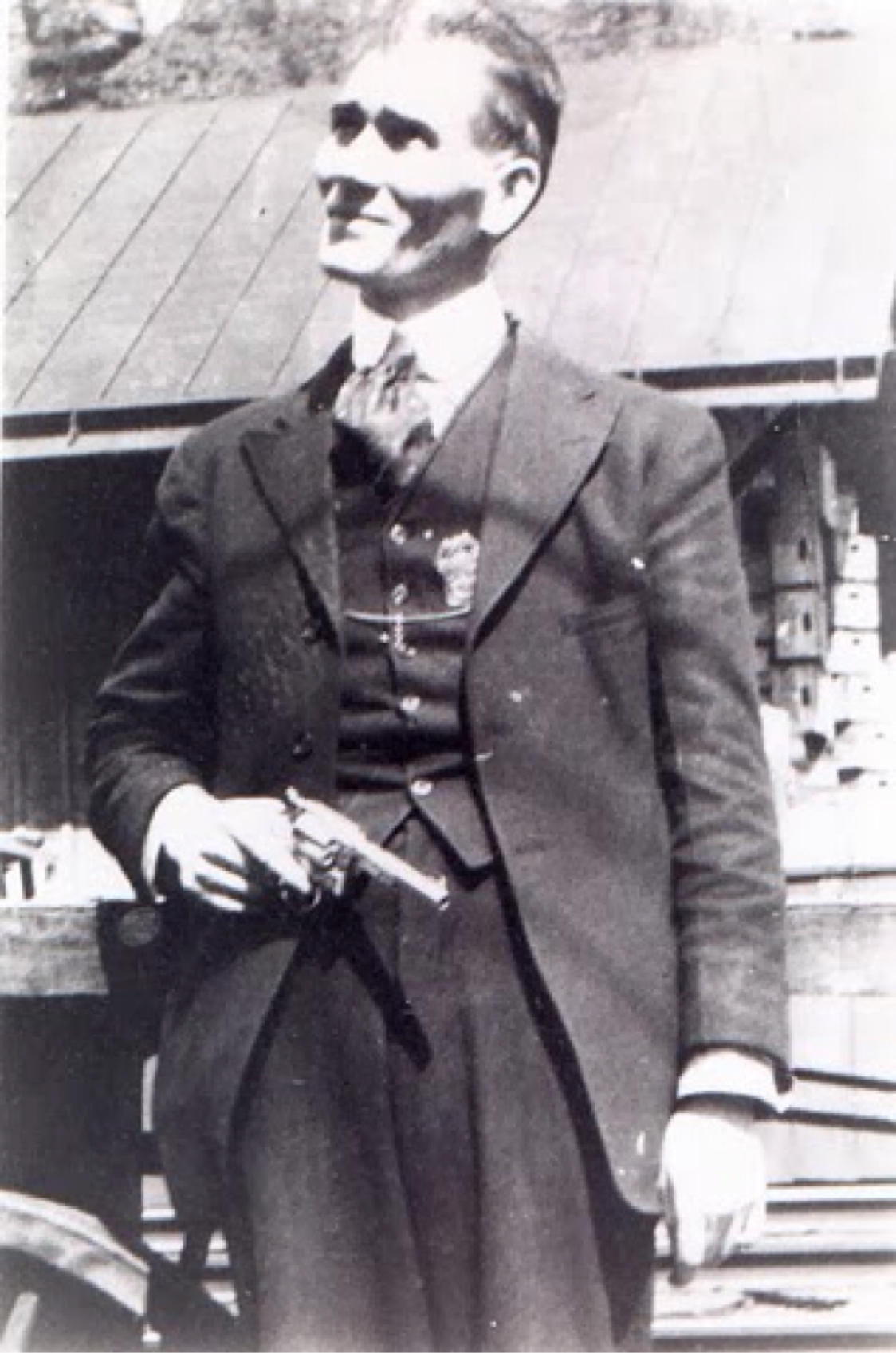
Sid Hatfield, police chief of Matewan, West Virginia, was shot by Lively on August 1, 1921.

While he was in Washington testifying before the Senate, at the same hearing at which Lively testified, Hatfield and his deputy, Edward Chambers, were indicted in McDowell County for "shooting up" a mining encampment in Mohawk, West Virginia. Lively supplied the information that was the basis of the prosecution. They stood trial in Welch, West Virginia on conspiracy charges. The county was anti-union, and Hatfield felt he was being brought there to be killed.

On August 1, 1921, the two men, both unarmed, were fatally shot on the steps of the courthouse by at least three Baldwin-Felts agents, Lively among them. The first to fire was Lively, shooting two guns at Hatfield, killing him. According to later testimony by Chambers' widow, Lively administered the coup de grâce to Chambers, shooting the wounded man in the head. One of the Baldwin-Felts men fired shots into the granite face of the courthouse and placed the guns in the dead hands of Hatfield and Chambers in order to lay the groundwork for a self-defense claim.

The Baldwin-Felts men claimed self-defense. In December 1921, Lively and two other Baldwin-Felts employees, George Pence and William Salters, were acquitted of murder charges in the Chambers killing. The jury deliberated for 51 minutes before reaching a verdict. In April 1922, the three men were acquitted in the Hatfield slaying.

In his biography of Lively, author R. G. Yoho writes that there is "no conclusive proof" that the leadership of Baldwin-Felts conspired to kill Hatfield and Chambers, but that "circumstances and evidence strain credulity to think otherwise." Yoho points out that Thomas Felts was traumatized by the murder of his two brothers and the acquittal of Hatfield and the other defendants, that Lively had no reason to be at the courthouse, and that Lively's son Charles Albert Lively has written that his father stated that when the Felts brothers were killed Hatfield "signed his own death warrant". Yoho writes that there is "overwhelming proof" that Baldwin-Felts conspired with Lively to ensure that no one was convicted for the killings.

== After Matewan ==
Lively disappeared from public view after the murder trials, and in 1923 was working as McDowell County Deputy Sheriff and Prohibition officer, a position he acquired in January 1921. There, he was engaged in a number of violent incidents. He was fined $100 and sentenced to 60 days in jail after being found guilty of using unlawful force when he pistol-whipped a man during an arrest. In 1924, Lively was arrested again for assaulting a grand jury witness against him.

In 1925, Lively was arrested in Stirrat, West Virginia on a federal whiskey possession charge. He was ordered held when he could not post a $10,000 bond. Federal agents had raided his room at a Y.M.C.A., where he was staying under a pseudonym, and found one pint of liquor.

Later that year, while employed as a guard at a Fairmont-Chicago Coal Company mine in Chesapake, West Virginia, Lively and another man were indicted on charges that they assaulted the 13-year-old daughter of a non-union coal miner. The other man confessed and was sentenced to life in prison. Lively was acquitted. When the indictment was publicized, the UMWA protested Lively's employment as a guard, saying that he should not be employed in that position in any coal mine.

Lively worked as a deputy sheriff in West Virginia in the early 1930s, and in the 1940s he and his second wife, Ollie Mae, operated the Forde Hotel in Roanoke, Virginia. He and Ollie Mae purchased and managed an apartment building in Roanoke in 1955.

== Personal life and death ==
In 1911, Lively married Icie Bell Goff in Charleston, West Virginia. They had nine children, six sons and three daughters. Their marriage was unhappy due to his frequent absences, unfaithfulness and abuse toward his wife and children, which included beatings with a phone cord and locking one son in the cellar. He maintained the family's residence in Bluefield, West Virginia even while working as a union spy in western states.

In 1937, Lively was indicted for shooting his 16-year-old son Gordon in the neck. He was convicted and sentenced to 18 months in prison with hard labor, of which he served one year. After his release, Gordon shot his father with a shotgun, for which he was later imprisoned. Lively separated from his wife in the late 1930s and in 1940, without divorcing his wife, committed bigamy by marrying Ollie Mae Hale, a woman 20 years his junior. They divorced in 1961, and Lively moved back with his first wife.

He died in 1962 in Huntington, West Virginia, at the age of 75. His death was ruled a suicide by a gunshot wound to the head. Lively had been blind for over a year, and his wife, who had serious health problems, was hospitalized shortly before his suicide.

== In popular culture ==
Lively was portrayed by Bob Gunton in the 1987 John Sayles film Matewan, which depicts the Battle of Matewan and mentions the subsequent assassination of Hatfield.

He was the subject of a biography in 2020 by historian R. G. Yoho, The Nine Lives of Charles E. Lively: The Deadliest Man in the West Virginia-Colorado Coal Mine Wars.

== See also ==
- History of union busting in the United States
- Labor spying in the United States
- Union busting
