= Matewan Historic District =

Historic district in West Virginia, United States

- U.S. National Register of Historic Places
- U.S. National Historic Landmark District
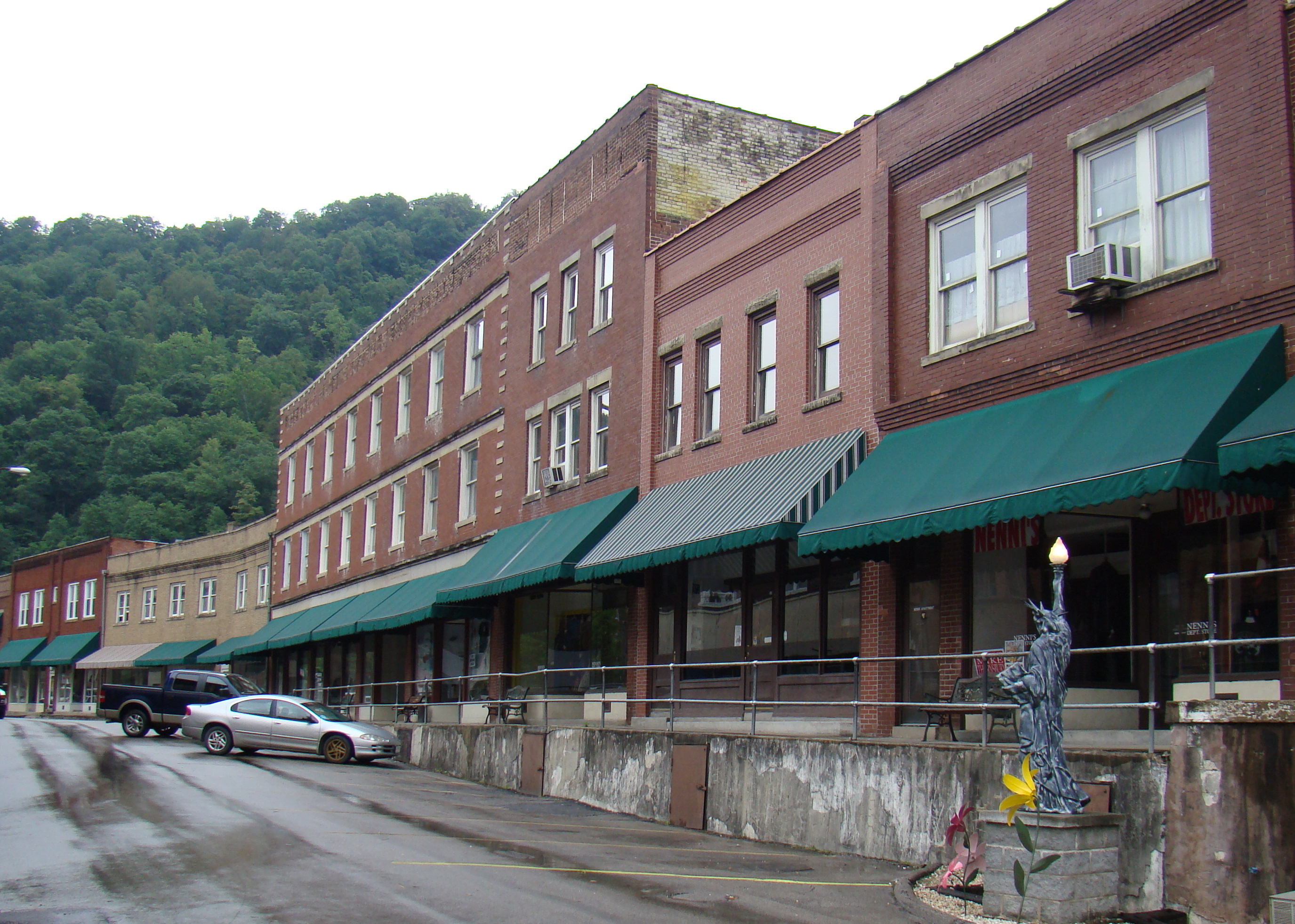
- Matewan Historic District, June 2008

- Location within West Virginia Location within the United States
- Location: Roughly bounded by McCoy Alley, Railroad Alley, Mate St. underpass and Warm Hollow to the head of the hollow, Matewan, West Virginia
- Coordinates: 37°37′21″N 82°9′55″W
- Area: 10 acres (4.0 ha)
- Built: 1893
- Architect: Levi J. Dean
- Architectural style: Early Commercial, Classical Revival, Bungalow/craftsman
- NRHP reference No.: 93000303

Significant dates
- Added to NRHP: April 27, 1993
- Designated NHLD: February 18, 1997

The Matewan Historic District encompasses the town center of the rural coal mining community of Matewan, West Virginia. Matewan was the scene of the Battle of Matewan on May 19, 1920, during a coal miners' strike, an event which led to the Battle of Blair Mountain, the largest insurrection ever associated with the labor movement in the United States, and was depicted in the film Matewan. It was designated a National Historic Landmark in 1997.

== Description ==
Matewan is located on the banks of the Tug Fork, a tributary of the Big Sandy River in mountainous western West Virginia. The hills rise steeply above the river, and the town center is located in a segment of flood plain on the north bank. It is bounded on the west by a 20th-century concrete bridge, and on the east by Mate Creek. There are two main roads, Mate Street (West Virginia Highway 49) and Main Street, with McCoy Alley paralleling Main Street between it and the river. Main Street and Mate Street are separated by a row of commercial buildings and by the right-of-way of the Norfolk Southern Railway. This basic layout is unchanged since the historic events of the 1920s, although the bridge is a replacement and the railroad bed has been raised. The row of commercial buildings are mainly vernacular early 20th-century buildings, most of which were standing at the time. A few historically significant buildings have been lost, including that housing the Urias Hotel, headquarters of the Baldwin–Felts Detective Agency operatives.

== History ==
In the early 20th century, Matewan was essentially a company town, in which the owners of the coal mines controlled many aspects of the lives of the miners they employed. In a response to efforts by the United Mine Workers of America to unionize the miners in the region, the owners hired detectives of the Baldwin-Felts Agency to evict the families of striking workers from their company-owned housing. In Matewan, this effort was resisted by the chief of police, Sid Hatfield, who objected to the presence of armed detectives in the town. In a standoff on May 19, 1920, shots were fired, and the ensuing shootout resulted in the deaths of 10 men: seven detectives, two miners, and Matewan's mayor. The event served to greatly heighten tensions, and prompted many miners to join the union. The miners' actions culminated in the September 1921 Battle of Blair Mountain, which was ended by the intervention of federal troops. It was the most violent act of labor violence in United States history.

== Gallery ==
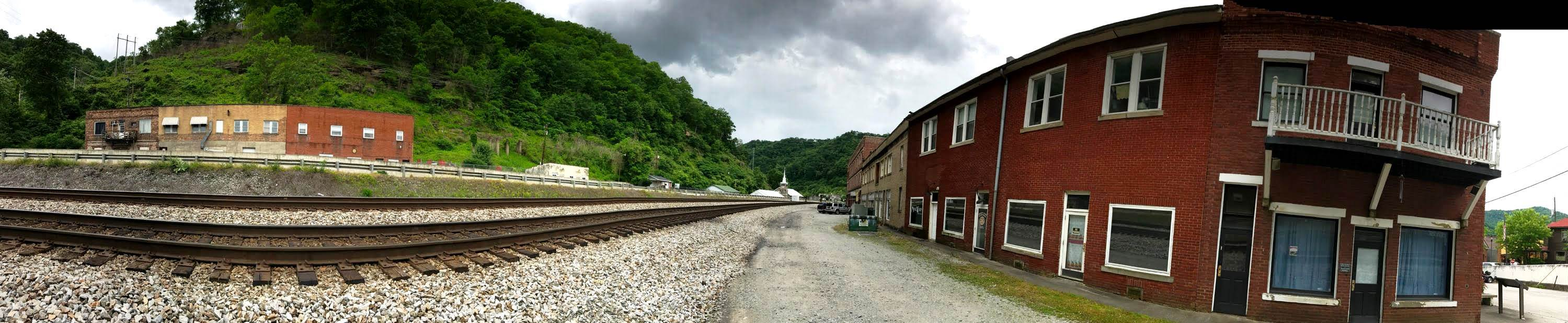
Panorama of Matewan West Virginia Historic District

== See also ==
- List of National Historic Landmarks in West Virginia
- National Register of Historic Places listings in Mingo County, West Virginia
