= Matewan (film) =

1987 American drama film by John Sayles

- Theatrical release poster
- Directed by: John Sayles
- Written by: John Sayles
- Produced by: Peggy Rajski; Maggie Renzi
- Starring: Chris Cooper; James Earl Jones; Mary McDonnell; Will Oldham
- Cinematography: Haskell Wexler
- Edited by: Sonya Polonsky
- Music by: Mason Daring
- Distributed by: Cinecom Pictures
- Release date: August 28, 1987 (United States)
- Running time: 132 minutes
- Country: United States
- Language: English
- Budget: $4 million (estimated)
- Box office: under $2 million (US)

Matewan (/ˈmeɪtwɒn/) is a 1987 American historical drama film written and directed by John Sayles, and starring Chris Cooper (in his film debut), James Earl Jones, Mary McDonnell and Will Oldham, with David Strathairn, Kevin Tighe and Gordon Clapp in supporting roles. The independent film dramatizes the events of the 1920 Battle of Matewan, a coal miners' strike in the small town of Matewan in the Appalachian countryside of Mingo County, West Virginia.

The film was a critical success but a box-office failure, grossing under $2 million on an estimated $4 million budget. It was nominated for the Academy Award for Best Cinematography, and received a Criterion Collection re-release in 2019. In 2023, Matewan was selected for preservation in the United States National Film Registry by the Library of Congress as "culturally, historically or aesthetically significant".

== Plot ==
In mid-May 1920, Joe Kenehan, an ex-Wobbly with pacifist leanings, arrives in Matewan to organize the miners working for the Stone Mountain Coal Company. He sees a mob of miners—on strike because of recent wage cuts—beating up black workers who have been lured by the company into crossing the picket line. Kenehan takes up residence at a boarding house run by a miner's widow, Elma Radnor, and her 15-year-old son, Danny (himself a miner and a budding Baptist preacher). The miners resist letting imported workers, black or Italian, into their union. Their go-it-alone position is encouraged by C. E. Lively, a company spy in their ranks who tries to goad the miners into violence and secretly informs the Baldwin-Felts Detective Agency of the "red" Kenehan's presence.

The next day, two Baldwin-Felts agents, Griggs and Hickey, arrive and seek residence at the Radnor boarding house. Danny at first refuses to rent them a room, but Kenehan voluntarily moves into a hotel, freeing up a room for the agents and averting trouble for Mrs. Radnor. Griggs and Hickey then start a campaign to evict union miners from company-owned houses. Mayor Testerman and Police Chief Sid Hatfield won't let them be evicted without writs from Charleston. Hatfield deputizes the men in town and tells them to go home and get their guns.

The Baldwin-Felts agents turn their attention to the strikers' camp outside Matewan, where miners and their families are living in tents. At night, strikebreakers fire shots into the camp. The next day, the agents enter the camp to demand that all food and clothing purchased at the company store with scrip be turned over to them, but are thwarted by the arrival of armed hill people, whose land was taken by the coal company. The hill people complain about last night's noise, express sympathy for the miners, and compel the Baldwin-Felts men to leave empty-handed.

Delays in receiving strike funds from the United Mine Workers of America test the patience of Danny and other miners who grow disillusioned and turn to violence in spite of Kenehan's warnings. The miners are involved in a night-time shootout with the agents. Sephus Purcell is wounded, but not before he recognizes that Lively is an infiltrator in their midst.

Lively tries to disgrace Kenehan by persuading a young widow, Bridey Mae Tolliver, to falsely accuse him of sexual assault. Lively also plants a letter that makes Kenehan appear to be the infiltrator, which leads the miners to plot to kill him. After overhearing Griggs and Hickey discuss the scheme to frame Kenehan, Danny is discovered and threatened by Hickey. That night, while preaching at the Freewill church, Danny relates a parable about Joseph that convinces the miners they have been deceived by a false story. The inebriated Griggs and Hickey are giggling in the church and not paying attention to what Danny is preaching. Lively, however, is paying attention and slips out the rear of the church, and temporarily flees town. Danny's teenaged friend Hillard Elkins runs to the camp to stop the killing of Kenehan. Meanwhile, the wounded Sephus makes his way back and informs the others of Lively's betrayal, and they burn down his restaurant.

Later, while stealing coal from the mine, Danny and Hillard encounter the agents. Danny hides, but Hillard is caught and tortured. Although he offers five names of confederates, he is murdered anyway because, as Lively reveals, the named men all died years earlier in a mine accident. Lively warns the agents that the death of a boy like Hillard will stir people up. The next day, an emotional funeral for Hillard is held at the camp.

The tension builds when Baldwin-Felts reinforcements arrive with orders to carry out the evictions. As the mayor makes one last attempt at negotiating, Kenehan comes running to try to stop the bloodshed. The sudden movement sets off a gunfight between the exposed Baldwins and the armed townspeople firing from barricades and rooftops. Chief Hatfield shoots two men and survives the battle, but Kenehan is killed and the mayor is shot in the stomach. Griggs is brought down, while Hickey escapes to Elma Radnor's boarding house, where she kills him with a shotgun. Seven Baldwin-Felts men and two townspeople are ultimately killed, along with Mayor Testerman, who dies from his wounds.

In the epilogue, the narrator explains that the mayor's wife married Chief Hatfield, who himself was shot and killed in broad daylight on the steps of the McDowell County Courthouse on August 1, 1921, with Lively delivering the coup de grâce. Hatfield's murder started the West Virginia Coal Wars.

== Cast ==
- Chris Cooper as Joe Kenehan
- James Earl Jones as "Few Clothes" Johnson
- Mary McDonnell as Elma Radnor
- Will Oldham as Danny Radnor
- David Strathairn as Police Chief Sid Hatfield
- Ken Jenkins as Sephus Purcell
- Gordon Clapp as Griggs
- Kevin Tighe as Hickey
- John Sayles as Hardshell Preacher
- Bob Gunton as C. E. Lively
- Josh Mostel as Mayor Cabell Testerman
- Nancy Mette as Bridey Mae Tolliver
- Jace Alexander as Hillard Elkins
- Joe Grifasi as Fausto
- Maggie Renzi as Rosaria
- Jo Henderson as Mrs. Elkins
- Gary McCleery as Ludi

== Production ==
2015 photo of Thurmond, a mostly deserted West Virginia coal town

Matewan was filmed on location in West Virginia. The town of Thurmond stood in for Matewan.

Other scenes were filmed in New River Gorge National Park and Preserve in southern West Virginia's Appalachian Mountains.

== Music ==
The film score features Appalachian music of the period composed and performed by Mason Daring, who has frequently worked on Sayles's films. West Virginia bluegrass singer Hazel Dickens sings the film's title track, "Fire in the Hole", and appears in the film as a member of the Freewill Baptist Church whose voice is heard leading the congregation in an a cappella hymn, "What A Friend We Have in Jesus". She sings "Hills of Galilee" over the closing credits, and also memorably sings "Gathering Storm" at the grave of the murdered young union miner, Hillard Elkins. In his book about the making of Matewan, Sayles writes:

Mason and I both wanted to get Hazel Dickens involved from the beginning. Hazel grew up in West Virginia coal country hearing the songs and sermons, and her voice carries all the mournfulness and strength of the hill tradition.... When she sings at Hillard's funeral it is not only background sound but an important action in the story. There is a sense of tragic destiny in many hill ballads, and the expression of that resignation to doom is as palpable an antagonist to Joe [Kenehan] as the Baldwin-Felts agents are. As he stands at the graveside and Hazel sings we wonder how can he go against fate – how can he fight all that?

The soundtrack was released on LP by Columbia. Besides Dickens, performers include John P. Hammond and Phil Wiggins (harmonica); Gerry Milnes and Stuart Schulman (fiddle), Jim Costa (mandolin); John Curtis (guitar), and Mason Daring (guitar, dobro).

== Reception ==
Variety praised the acting in the film, writing: "Matewan is a heartfelt, straight-ahead tale of labor organizing in the coal mines of West Virginia in 1920 that runs its course like a train coming down the track. Among the memorable characters is Joe Kenehan (Chris Cooper), a young union organizer who comes to Matewan to buck the bosses. With his strong face and Harrison Ford good-looks, Cooper gives the film its heartbeat.... Most notable of the black workers is 'Few Clothes' Johnson (James Earl Jones), a burly good-natured man with a powerful presence and a quick smile. Jones' performance practically glows in the dark. Also a standout is Sayles veteran David Strathairn as the sheriff with quiet integrity who puts his life on the line."

New York Times film critic Vincent Canby lauded the acting and cinematography:

There's not a weak performance in the film, but I especially admired the work of Mr. Cooper, Mr. Tighe, Miss McDonnell, Miss Mette, Mr. Gunton, Mr. Strathairn and Mr. Mostel. They may be playing Social-Realist icons, but each manages to make something personal and idiosyncratic out of the material, without destroying the ballad-like style. For the most part, Haskell Wexler's photography doesn't go overboard in finding poetry in the images.

Critic Desson Howe liked the look of the film and wrote: "Cinematographer Haskell Wexler etches the characters in dark charcoal against a misty background. You get the feeling of dirt, sweat and—despite the story's mythic intentions—the grim grey struggle of it all. And Sayles, struggling for authority from Return of the Secaucus 7 through The Brother from Another Planet, has finally tapped the vein."

Jonathan Rosenbaum called Matewan a "simpleminded yet stirring" film that "offers a bracing alternative to complacent right-wing as well as liberal claptrap. If Sayles's bite were as lethal as his bark, he might have given this a harder edge and a stronger conclusion."

The review aggregator Rotten Tomatoes reported that 94% of critics gave the film a positive rating, based on 34 reviews. Metacritic, which uses a weighted average, assigned the film a score of 73 out of 100, based on 15 critics, indicating "generally favorable" reviews.

== Awards and nominations ==
Haskell Wexler was nominated for the Academy Award for Best Cinematography at the 60th Academy Awards.

In 2011, Empire Online ranked the film 21st on its list of the 50 Greatest American Independent Movies. Its description read, "The film not only marked a significant turning point in Sayles's career (it was his first film to attract anything like a mainstream audience), it's arguably an even more relevant, cautionary tale today than it was during the Reagan/Thatcher controlled-climate of its release year."

In 2023, the film was selected for preservation in the United States National Film Registry by the Library of Congress as "culturally, historically or aesthetically significant."

== In popular culture ==
The version of "Gathering Storm" used in the film was sampled by Canadian post-rock band Godspeed You! Black Emperor for the track "Providence" on its 1997 album F♯ A♯ ∞. The band later reused the melody for a track also named "Gathering Storm" on its 2000 album Lift Your Skinny Fists Like Antennas To Heaven.
