= Battle of Blair Mountain =

Violent 1921 American labor dispute

- Part of the West Virginia Coal Wars
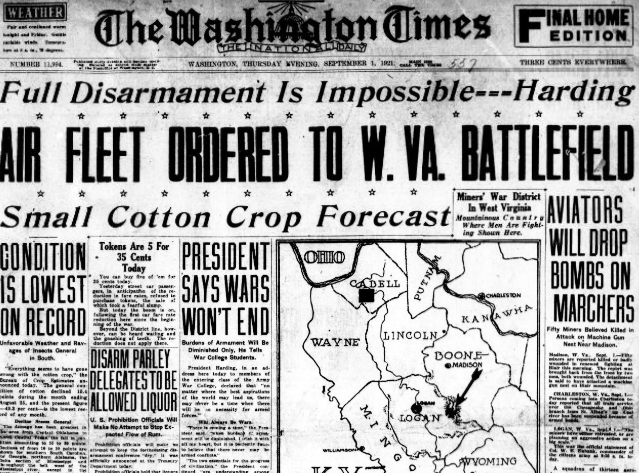
- Cover of The Washington Times with the headline that the US airfleet had been sent into West Virginia.
- Date: August 25 – September 2, 1921 (1 week and 1 day)
- Location: Logan County, West Virginia; 37°51′45″N 81°51′23″W
- Result: Tactical law enforcement–military victory: Bill Blizzard acquitted of treason; Most arrested miners are acquitted or receive short prison sentences

Parties
United Mine Workers	Baldwin–Felts Detective Agency; United States; United States Army; West Virginia; Logan County Sheriff's Department; West Virginia State Police; West Virginia National Guard

Lead figures
Bill Blizzard; Mother Jones	Don Chafin; William Eubanks; Billy Mitchell

Number
10,000	3,000 initial forces; 27,000 federal troops

Casualties and losses
50–100 killed	30 killed; Army: 4 killed

The Battle of Blair Mountain was the largest labor uprising in United States history and the largest armed uprising since the American Civil War. The conflict occurred in Logan County, West Virginia, as part of the Coal Wars, a series of early-20th-century labor disputes in Appalachia.

For five days, from late August to early September 1921, 10,000 armed coal miners confronted 3,000 lawmen and strikebreakers (called the Logan Defenders) who were backed by coal mine operators during the miners' attempt to unionize the southwestern West Virginia coalfields when tensions rose between workers and mine management. The battle ended after approximately one million rounds were fired, and the United States Army, represented by the West Virginia National Guard, which was led by McDowell County native William Eubanks, intervened by presidential order.

Short documentary about the events

== Background ==
Since the founding of the United Mine Workers union, a trade union founded with a focus on coal miners, in 1890, coal mines in Mingo County, West Virginia, and its surrounds hired only nonunion workers, and strictly enforced employment contracts that included union membership as grounds for immediate termination. As miners in the area lived almost exclusively in company towns, termination also meant eviction. Company homes were all that were available, so evicted workers were forced to live in tent colonies along the Tug Fork River. Rows of company houses were boarded up, and the miners and their families, including in one instance a woman with a newborn, were thrown out and had to live in tents or board houses with no sides.

In 1920, the UMW's new president John L. Lewis sought to finally end the three-decade resistance to unionization in the area. He was under increased pressure to do so from both miners elsewhere participating in the United Mine Workers coal strike of 1919, and from affected mine operators who were now being undercut by nonunion mines in West Virginia. One of the workers from the Keystone Mine said miners from Illinois and Pennsylvania had put up fliers about joining the union. The miners were paid very little: "You could go in the mines and load five or six cars of coal and couldn't come out to the company store and get enough food to feed your family till you worked another day."

This unionization push included efforts from Frank Keeney, president of the local union district, and Mother Jones, who gave fiery speeches at the age of 83. An eyewitness stated that Mother Jones would "come up to the head of the creek ... and call out for all the men that wanted to be let out of slavery to follow her. And they did, scores of them." Over 3,000 Mingo County miners joined the union—and were summarily fired. The coal companies then hired agents of the Baldwin–Felts Detective Agency to evict the families of their former employees.

On May 19, 1920, a dozen Baldwin–Felts detectives, including Lee Felts, arrived in Matewan in Mingo County and connected with Lee's brother Albert Felts. Albert and Lee were the brothers of Thomas Felts, the co-owner and director of the private detective agency. The Baldwin–Felts agents were union busters who had a reputation for using violence against groups looking to organize. The agents were also responsible for the Ludlow Massacre of 1914 in Colorado. Albert had already been in the Matewan area and had tried to bribe Mayor Cabell Testerman with $500 (equivalent to $8,036 in 2025) to place machine guns on roofs in the town; Testerman refused. That afternoon, Albert and Lee, along with 11 other men, set out to the Stone Mountain Coal Co. property. The first family they evicted was a woman and her children; the woman's husband was not home at the time. The detectives forced them out at gunpoint in poor weather. Witnesses sent word to the authorities in town.

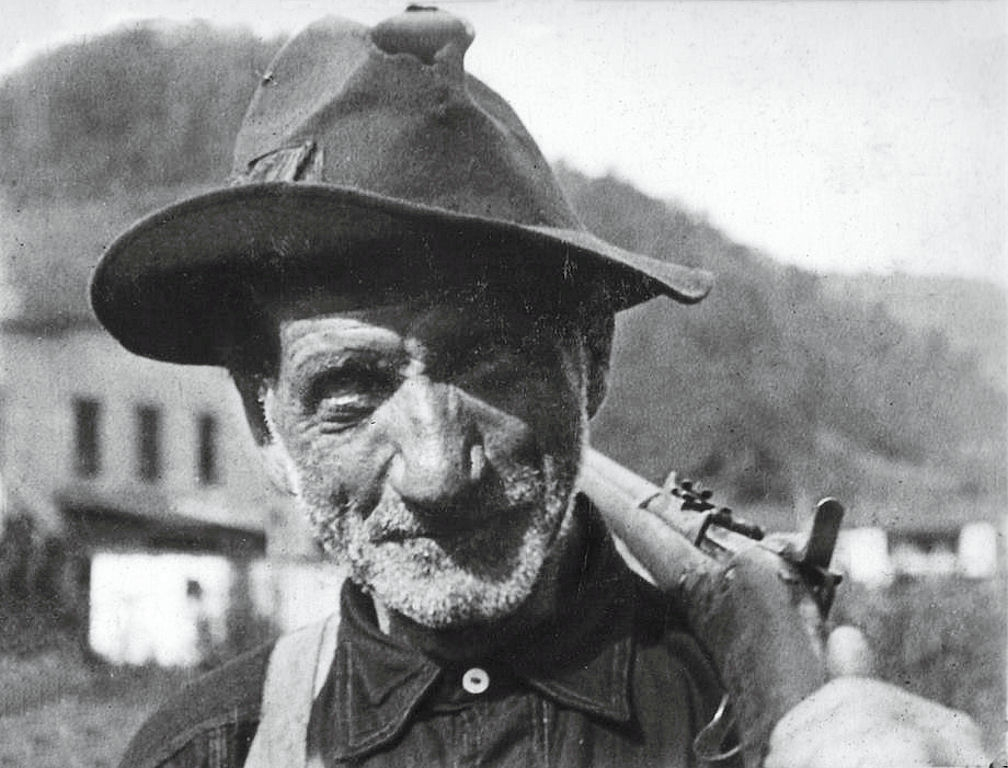
Blair Mountain miner with his rifle on his shoulder

As the agents walked to the train station to leave town, Police Chief Sid Hatfield and a group of deputized miners confronted them and told them they were under arrest. Albert Felts replied that in fact he had a warrant for Hatfield's arrest. Testerman was alerted, and he ran out into the street after a miner shouted that Hatfield had been arrested. Hatfield backed into the store and Testerman asked to see the warrant. After reviewing it, Mayor Testerman exclaimed, "This is a bogus warrant." There followed a gunfight, in which Chief Hatfield shot the agent Albert Felts. Testerman, together with Lee Felts, was also among the ten men killed (three from the town and seven from the agency).

The gunfight became known as the Matewan Massacre, and held symbolic significance among the miners, representing the first major setback for Baldwin–Felts. Chief Sid Hatfield was lauded as a hero by the union miners. Throughout the summer and into the fall of 1920, the union gained strength in Mingo County, as did the resistance of the coal operators. Sporadic shootouts occurred up and down the Tug River. In late June, state police under the command of Captain Brockus raided the Lick Creek tent colony near Williamson. Miners were said to have fired on Brockus and Martin's men from the colony. In response, the state police shot and arrested miners, destroyed their tents, and evicted their families. Both sides were bolstering their arms, and Sid Hatfield continued to support the resistance (specifically by converting Testerman's jewelry store into a gun shop).

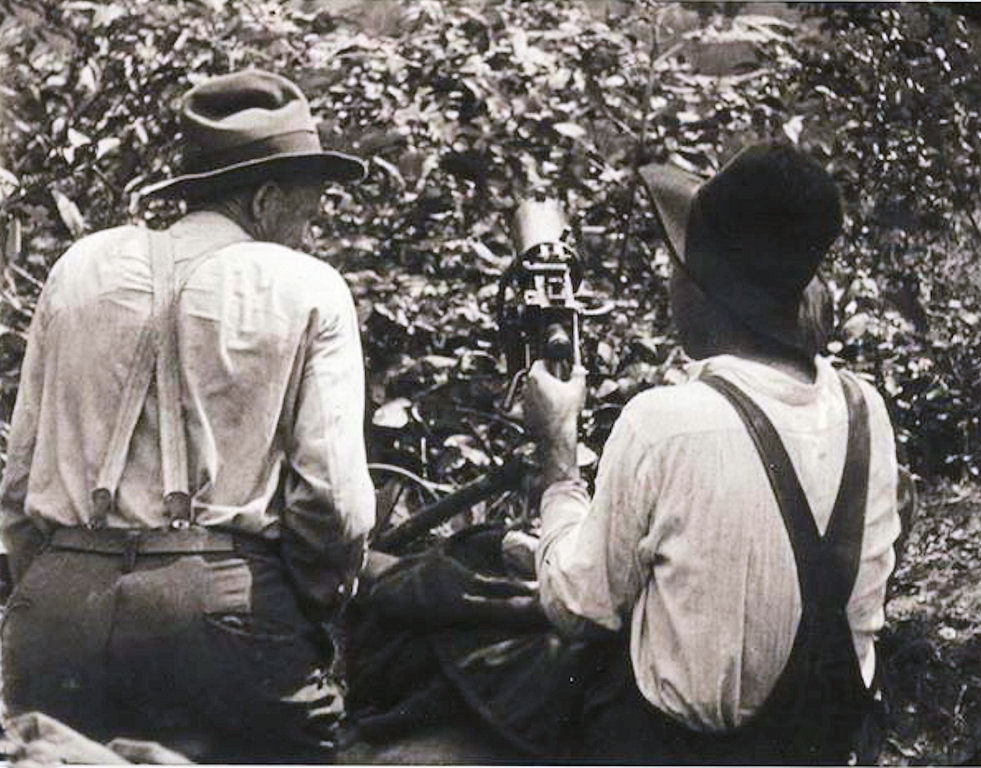
Two union coal miners sitting in a sniper's nest with a machine gun

On January 26, 1921, Hatfield's trial for killing Albert Felts began. It was in the national spotlight and brought much attention to the miners' cause. Hatfield's stature and mythical status grew as the trial proceeded, driven largely by his interactions with reporters. All men were acquitted in the end, but overall, the union was facing significant setbacks. Eighty percent of mines had reopened with imported replacements and ex-strikers who signed yellow-dog contracts to return to work. In mid-May 1921, union miners launched an assault on nonunion mines. In a short time, the conflict had consumed the entire Tug River Valley. This "Three Days Battle" was ended in a truce and the implementation of martial law. From the beginning, the miners perceived the enforcement of martial law as one-sided. Hundreds of miners were arrested, often for minor infractions. The miners responded with guerrilla tactics and sabotage.

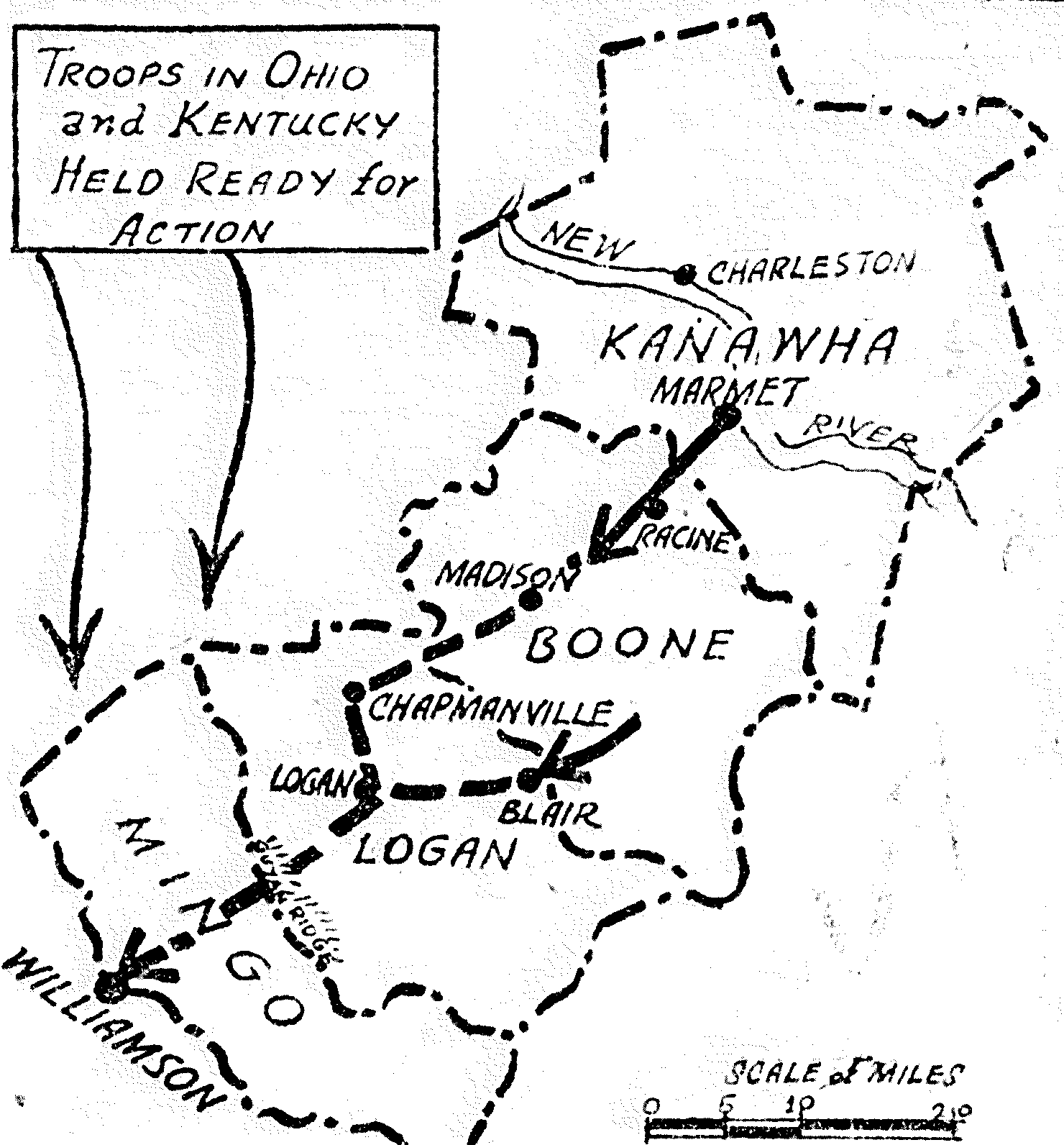
Map of the movement of the union miners during their march from Marmet towards Williamson

Hatfield traveled to McDowell County on August 1, 1921, to stand trial on charges of dynamiting a coal tipple. Along with him traveled a good friend, Ed Chambers, and their wives. However, a group of Baldwin–Felts ambushed Hatfield and Chambers outside the courthouse. The group included Charlie E. Lively, a double agent working for the coal industry who had opened a restaurant near the UMWA office and reported back to the coal company. The agents shot Hatfield and Chambers as they approached the steps of the courthouse. One agent then descended the steps and further shot Chambers in the back of the head. Hatfield's and Chambers' bodies were returned to Matewan, where word of the murders spread through the local community.

Angered by the murder of Hatfield, the miners again took up arms. Miners along the Little Coal River were among the first to organize and began patrolling the area. Sheriff Don Chafin of Logan County sent troopers to the Little Coal River area, where armed miners captured, disarmed, and routed them.

On August 7, 1921, the leaders of the United Mine Workers (UMW) District 17, which encompassed much of southern West Virginia, called a rally in Charleston. The leaders were Frank Keeney and Fred Mooney, veterans of previous mine conflicts in the region. Keeney and Mooney met with Governor Ephraim Morgan and presented him with a petition of the miners' demands. When Morgan rejected the demands, the miners began to talk of a march on Mingo to free the confined miners, end martial law and organize the county. However, this required them to pass through Logan County via Blair Mountain, which was under the supervision of the anti-union Sheriff Chafin.

== Battle ==
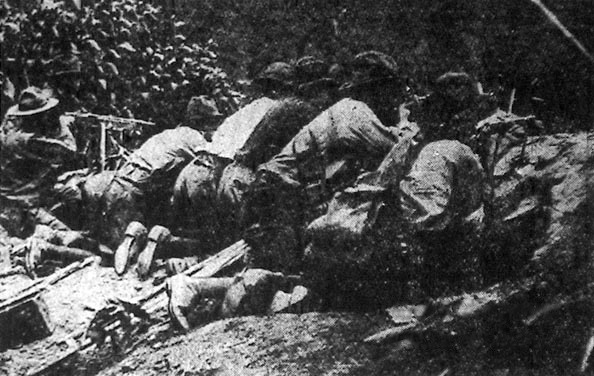
Logan County Sheriff's deputies during the battle of Blair Mountain.

At a rally on August 7, Mary Harris "Mother" Jones called on the miners not to march into Logan and Mingo counties and set up the union by force. She feared a bloodbath as the Logan County deputies were better equipped than the miners. Regardless, on August 20, armed men began gathering at Lens Creek Mountain, Kanawha County. Four days later, an estimated 13,000 had gathered and began marching towards Logan County. Miners near St. Albans, Kanawha County, commandeered a Chesapeake and Ohio freight train, renamed by the miners the "Blue Steel Special", to meet up with the advance column of marchers at Danville, Boone County, on their way to "Bloody Mingo". During this time, Keeney and Mooney fled to Ohio, while Bill Blizzard assumed quasi-leadership of the miners. Meanwhile, Sheriff Chafin had begun to set up defenses on Blair Mountain. He was supported financially by the Logan County Coal Operators Association, creating the nation's largest private armed force of nearly 2,000.

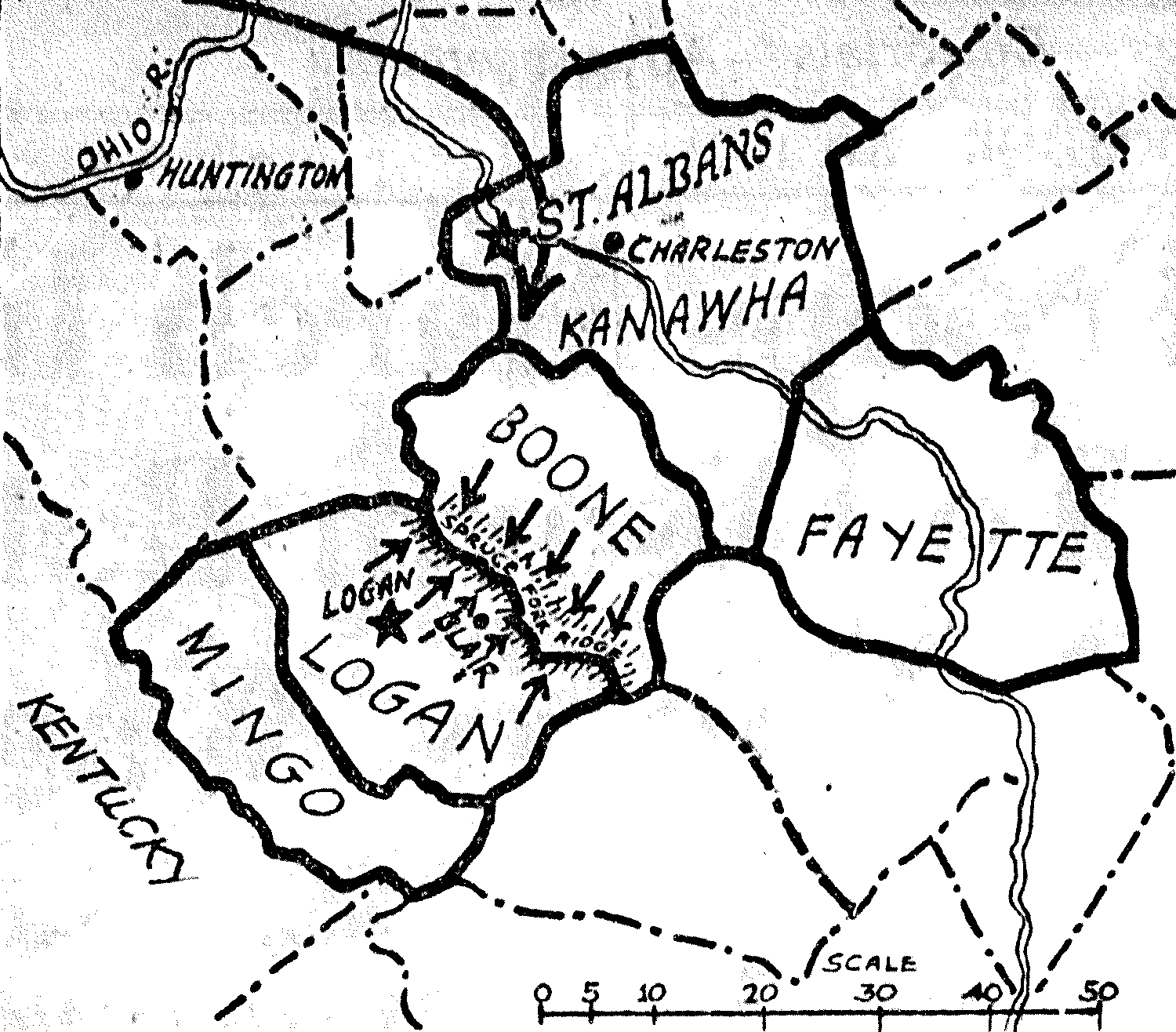
Short arrows indicate the location of fighting between union and nonunion forces. The long arrow shows federal troop movement.

The first skirmishes occurred on the morning of August 25. The bulk of the miners were still 15 mi (24 km) away. The following day, President Warren G. Harding threatened to send in federal troops and Army Martin MB-1 bombers. After a long meeting in Madison, Boone County, the miners were convinced to return home. However, within hours of the Madison decision, rumors abounded that Chafin's men had shot union sympathizers in the town of Sharples, just north of Blair Mountain, and that families had been caught in crossfire. As a result, the miners returned to Blair Mountain, many traveling in other stolen and commandeered trains.

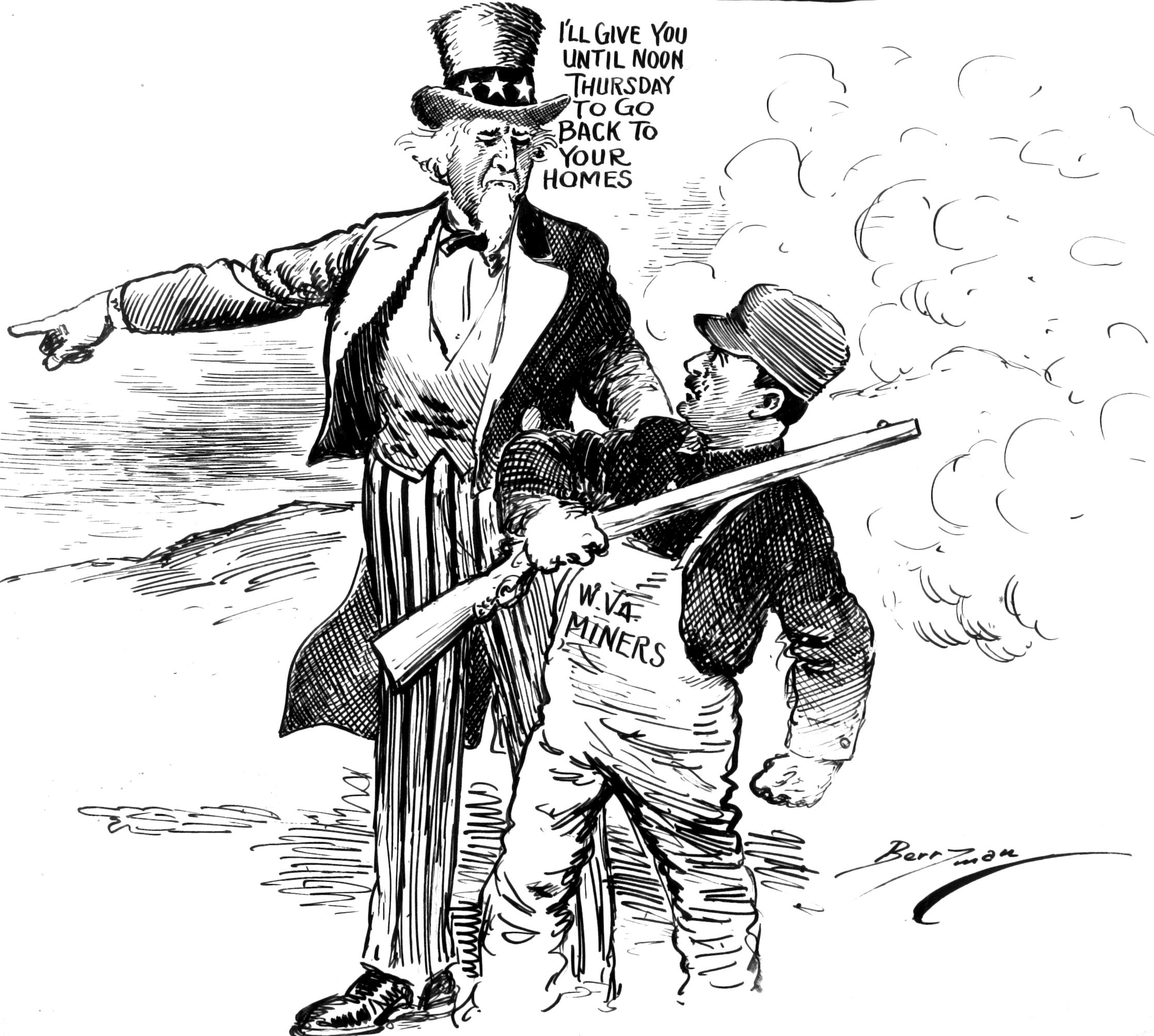
Political cartoon with Uncle Sam saying to the miners "I'll give you until noon Thursday to go back to your homes."

On August 29, the titular battle began in earnest. Chafin's men, though outnumbered, had the advantage of higher positions and better weaponry. Private planes were hired to drop homemade bombs on the miners. At least one did not explode and was recovered by the miners; it was used months later to great effect as evidence for the defense during treason and murder trials. On orders from General Billy Mitchell, Army bombers from Maryland were also used for aerial surveillance. One Martin bomber crashed on its return flight, killing four of the five crew members.

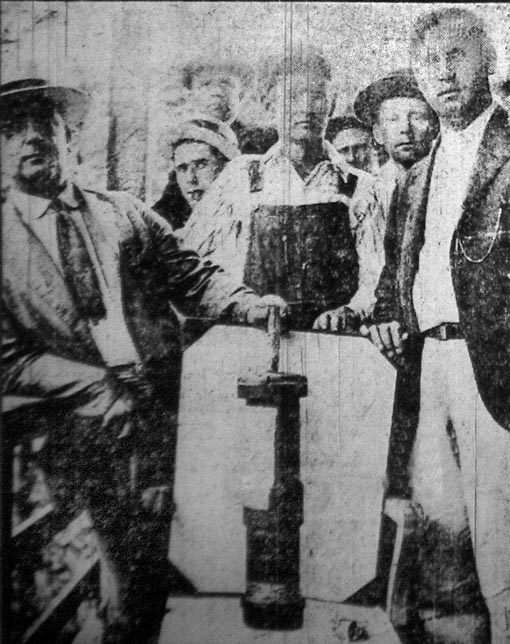
Coal miners in 1921 display an unexploded bomb dropped during the Battle of Blair Mountain

On August 30, Morgan appointed Colonel William Eubanks of the West Virginia National Guard to command the government and volunteer forces confronting the miners. Sporadic gun battles continued for a week, with the miners at one time nearly breaking through to the town of Logan and their target destinations (the nonunionized Logan and Mingo counties to the south). Gatling guns and machine guns were employed by both sides. Chafin's forces consisted of 90 men from Bluefield, West Virginia; 40 from Huntington, West Virginia; and about 120 from the West Virginia State Police. Three of Chafin's forces (two volunteers and a deputy sheriff) were killed, and one miner was fatally wounded.

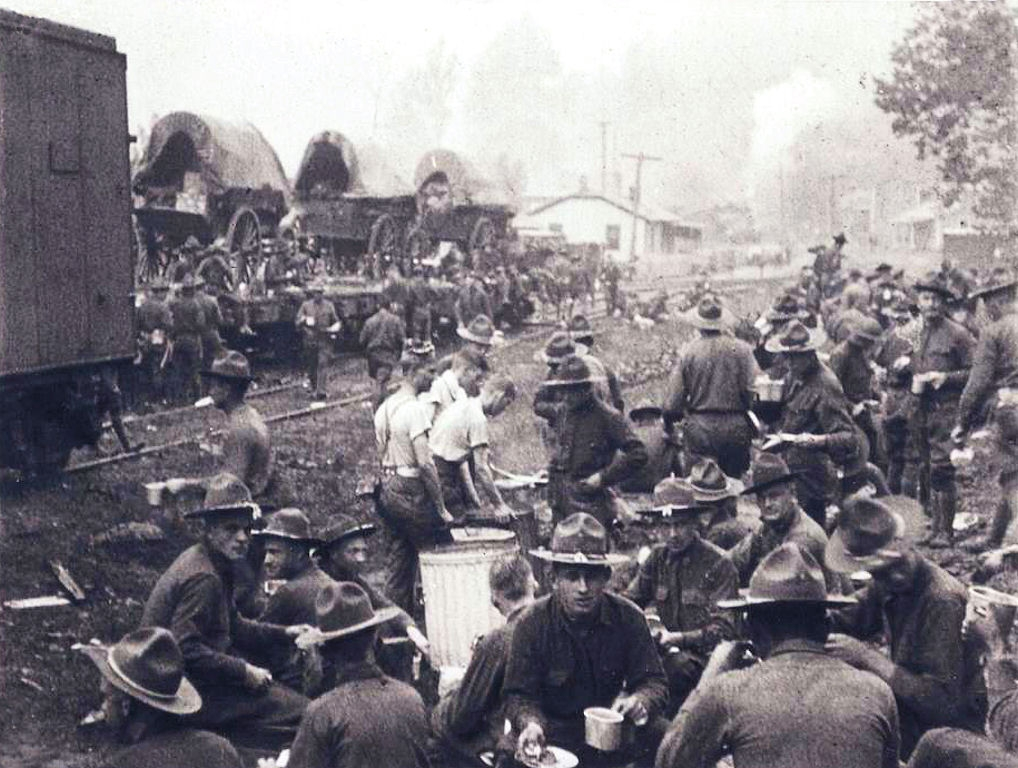
Federal troops arriving in Blair, WV and beginning to unload supplies.

Federal troops arrived by September 2. The miners, many of whom were veterans themselves, were unwilling to fire on U.S. troops. Bill Blizzard passed the word for the miners to start heading home the following day. Miners fearing jail and confiscation of their guns concealed their firearms in the woods before leaving Logan County. Some were found later, along with many spent and live cartridges, which helped archeologists reconstruct the course of the fighting.

The intervention of the federal government played a very important role in ending the battle of Blair Mountain. President Warren G. Harding ordered federal troops to the region in response to the growing conflict. When the troops arrived, the miners surrendered rather than continue fighting against the United States military. The miners believed that their struggle was against local and state authorities that supported the coal companies, rather than the federal government. Although the intervention ended in fighting, the miners did not achieve their immediate goal of freeing the imprisoned workers in Mingo County.

After the battle, 985 miners were indicted for murder, conspiracy to commit murder, accessory to murder, and treason against the State of West Virginia. Though the majority were acquitted by sympathetic juries, others were imprisoned for up to four years, with the last being paroled in 1925. At Blizzard's trial, the unexploded bomb was used as evidence against the government and companies, and he was acquitted.

== Legacy ==
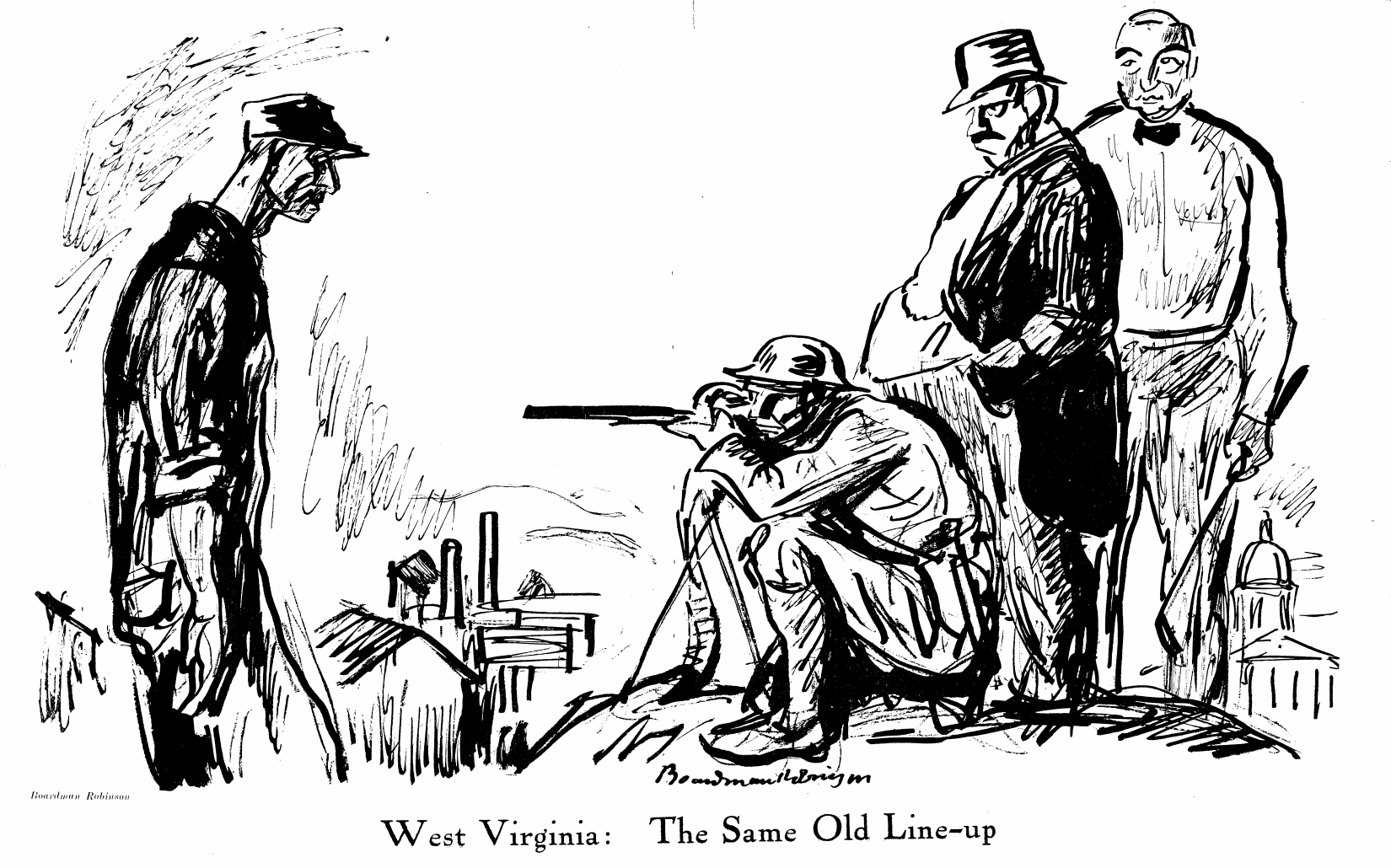
Political cartoon showing soldier with rifle trained on striking miner; standing to the right, behind the soldier, are President Harding and a mine owner. The caption reads "West Virginia: The same old line up." (1921)

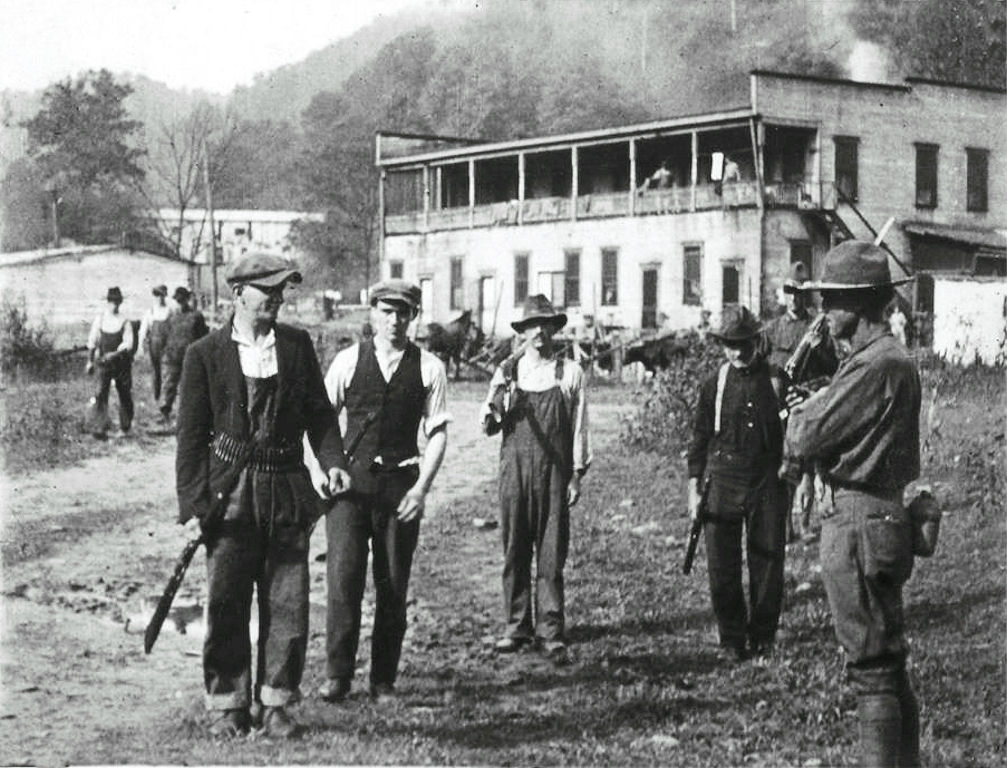
Armed coal miners surrendering their weapons to federal troops.

In the short term, the battle was an overwhelming victory for coal industry owners and management. United Mine Workers of America (UMWA or UMW) membership plummeted from more than 50,000 miners to approximately 10,000 over the next several years, and it was not until 1935—following the Great Depression and the beginning of the New Deal under President Franklin Delano Roosevelt—that the UMW fully organized in southern West Virginia.

This union defeat had major implications for the UMWA as a whole. As World War I ended, the demand for coal declined, adversely impacting the industry. Because of the defeat in West Virginia, the union was also undermined in Pennsylvania and Kentucky. By the end of 1925, Illinois was the only remaining unionized state in terms of soft coal production.

When the National Industrial Recovery Act was passed during FDR's presidency, workers were given the right to organize and bargain collectively. This led to huge growth in the UMWA and other unions. John L. Lewis then "led the drive to establish an organization of industrial unions, the Congress of Industrial Organizations (CIO), for those whom he felt were being neglected by the AFL." Lewis later fought for benefits for miners through work stoppages that angered FDR and many Americans. When UMWA members tacitly accepted increased mechanization in union coal mines after the war, mine owners agreed to provide workers with their first health and retirement plan.

In the long term, the battle raised awareness of the appalling conditions miners faced in the dangerous West Virginia coalfields. It also led to a change in union tactics in political battles to get the law on labor's side, by confronting recalcitrant and abusive management. This eventually resulted in a much larger organized labor victory a few years later during the New Deal in 1933. That, in turn, led to the UMWA helping organize many better-known unions, such as the Steel Workers during the mid-'30s, and spurred the creation of labor union affiliations and umbrella organizations, such as the American Federation of Labor (AFL) and Congress of Industrial Organizations (CIO).

In literature, Diane Gilliam Fisher's poetry collection Kettle Bottom explores "the West Virginia mine wars of 1920–21".

== Future of site ==
Starting in mid-2006, a local hobby archeologist, Kenneth King, led a team of professional archeologists to further investigate the battlefield. King and the team's initial survey "mapped 15 combat sites and discovered more than a thousand artifacts, from rifle and shotgun shell casings to coins and batteries [and] little sign of disturbance" to the site, challenging earlier surveys conducted by Arch Coal Inc., one of two companies that own the mining rights to Blair Mountain. In April 2008, Blair Mountain was chosen for the list of protected places on the National Register of Historic Places (NRHP).

The site was accepted and added to the NRHP list on March 30, 2009, but clerical errors by the West Virginia State Historic Preservation Office (SHPO) failed to notarize all objections, and it was removed. In mid-2010, National Geographic reported that "subsidiaries of two of the United States' largest coal producers – Arch Coal, Inc., and Massey Energy Company, ... – [held] permits to blast and strip-mine huge chunks of the upper slopes and ridge of Blair Mountain, removing much of the mountaintop".

In October 2012, a federal district judge ruled that a coalition of preservation groups did not have standing to sue to protect the historic site. On August 26, 2014, the United States Court of Appeals for the District of Columbia Circuit voted 2–1 to overturn the ruling and returned the case.

In April 2016, the order to remove the Blair Mountain battlefield from the National Register was overturned by a federal court, and the further decision to add the site back to the register was turned over to the Keeper of the National Register. On June 27, 2018, the Keeper's Office decided that the 2009 decision to remove the site from its listings was "erroneous" and issued a statement confirming that, as of that date, the site was again on the National Register.

== Historic interpretation ==
The Battle of Blair Mountain is related by the State of West Virginia through a Historic Highway marker. The marker was made by the West Virginia Division of Culture and History. The marker reads,

BATTLE OF BLAIR MT. In August of 1921, 7000 striking miners led by Bill Blizzard met at Marmet for a march on Logan to organize the southern coalfields for the UMWA. Reaching Blair Mt. on August 31, they were repelled by deputies and mine guards, under Sheriff Don Chafin, waiting in fortified positions. The five day battle ended with the arrival of U.S. Army and Air Corps. UMWA organizing efforts in southern WV were halted until 1933.

The marker is on West Virginia 17, about 8 miles (13 km) east of Logan, between Ethel and Blair.

== See also ==
- Anti-union violence in the United States
- Coal strike of 1902
- Colorado Labor Wars
- Copper Country strike of 1913–1914
- Cripple Creek miners' strike of 1894
- Harlan County War
- Illinois coal wars
- List of incidents of civil unrest in the United States
- List of rebellions in the United States
- List of worker deaths in United States labor disputes
- Labor history of the United States
- Ludlow Massacre
- Mining in the United States
- Molly Maguires
- Railroad Wars
- Range war
- Sheep Wars
- Union violence in the United States
- West Virginia Coal Wars
- West Virginia Mine Wars Museum

== Bibliography ==
- Blizzard, William C. (2010). When Miners March. Gay, WV: PM Press. ISBN 978-1604863000.
- Corbin, David (2011). Gun Thugs, Rednecks, and Radicals: A Documentary History of the West Virginia Mine Wars. Oakland: PM Press. ISBN 9781604864526.
- Corbin, David, ed. (1998). The West Virginia Mine Wars: An Anthology. Martinsburg, WV: Appalachian Editions. ISBN 978-0-9627486-0-8.
- Kinder, Chuck (2005). Last Mountain Dancer: Hard-Earned Lessons in Love, Loss, and Honky-Tonk. New York: Da Capo Press. ISBN 978-0-7867-1653-1.
- Lee, Howard B. (1969). Bloodletting in Appalachia: The Story of West Virginia's Four Major Mine Wars and Other Thrilling Incidents of Its Coal Fields. Morgantown, WV: West Virginia University Press. ISBN 978-0-87012-041-1.
- McGuire, Randall; Reckner, Paul (2003). "Building a Working-Class Archaeology: The Colorado Coal Field War Project". Industrial Archaeology Review. 25 (2): 83–95. doi:10.1179/iar.2003.25.2.83. S2CID 109047421.
- Mooney, Fred (1967). Struggle in the coal fields: The Autobiography of Fred Mooney. Morgantown, WV: West Virginia University Library. ISBN 9780937058107. OCLC 795742.
- Patel, Samir S. (January–February 2012). "Mountaintop Rescue". Archaeology. 65 (1).
- Savage, Lon (1990). Thunder in the Mountains: The West Virginia Mine War, 1920–21. Pittsburgh: University of Pittsburgh Press. ISBN 978-0-8229-3634-3.
- Shogan, Robert (2004). The Battle of Blair Mountain: The Story of America's Largest Union Uprising. Boulder, CO: Westview Press. ISBN 978-0-8133-4096-8.
- State of West Virginia (2002). Marking Our Past: West Virginia's Historical Highway Markers. Charleston: West Virginia Division of Culture and History.
- Torok, George D. (2004). A guide to historic coal towns of the Big Sandy River Valley. Knoxville, TN: University of Tennessee Press. ISBN 978-1-57233-282-9.
