= Ethel, West Virginia =

Unincorporated community in West Virginia, United States

- Unincorporated community
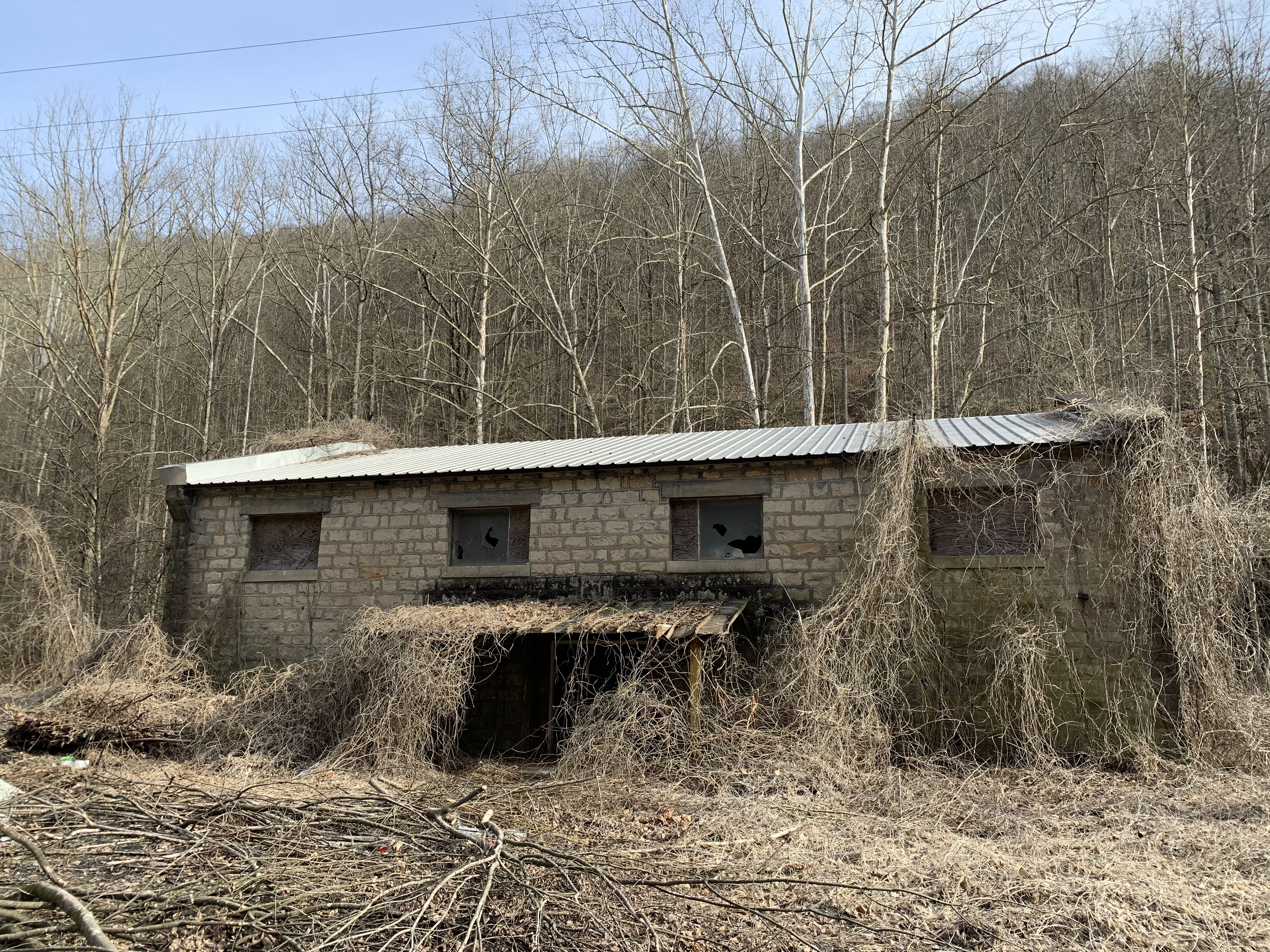
- Ethel Coal Company Supply Building, 2020

- Location within West Virginia Location within the United States
- Coordinates: 37°51′59″N 81°54′44″W
- Country: United States
- State: West Virginia
- County: Logan
- Elevation: 823 ft (251 m)
- Time zone: UTC-5 (Eastern (EST))
  - Summer (DST): UTC-4 (EDT)
- ZIP code: 25076
- Area codes: 304 & 681
- GNIS feature ID: 1554414

Ethel is an unincorporated community in Logan County, West Virginia, United States. Ethel is located on West Virginia Route 17, 4.5 miles (7.2 km) east-northeast of Logan. Ethel has a post office with ZIP code 25076.

== Geography ==
Ethel was originally located at the mouth of Left Fork (now Ethel Hollow) of Dingess Run. Today, Ethel includes Camp Branch, Freeze Fork (town and stream), Rockcamp Branch, Rockhouse Branch (now Georges Creek), Mash Branch (formerly Wanda), and Bearwallow Branch (formerly Red Campbell). It is situated at the base of Blair Mountain.

== History ==
In the 1890s, land speculators James L. Caldwell, a banker from Huntington, C.W. Campbell, an attorney from Huntington, and John Q. Dickinson, a banker from Charleston, acquired many acres of land on Dingess Run and Rum Creek. The trio procured some of Logan County's finest coal lands with six accessible seams of coal: the Lewis-Stockton or Five Block, the Chilton, the Winifrede, the Coalburg, the Cedar Grove or Island Creek, and the Number 2 Gas or Eagle Seam. They formed the Dingess-Rum Coal Company in June 1903 to administer their lands, which totaled over 26,000 acres. They surveyed a railroad bed up Dingess Run and laid the cross-ties, leaving only the rails to be laid by the C&O Railroad, which occurred by late 1906. From there, the railroad extended up Right Fork and Left Fork (Ethel Hollow). At the juncture of the two forks, the company town of Ethel, named for the daughter or wife of an early coal operator, was established around 1907.

=== Ethel Coal Company ===
Ethel Coal Company, formed in 1906, operated No. 1 and No. 2 mines from 1907 to 1916 in Ethel Hollow. Between 1907 and 1916, the company constructed dwelling houses in Ethel Hollow. The company built the Ethel No. 1 Company Store; its ruins are visible today. During this time, about 1914, Italian stonemasons constructed the Ethel Coal Company Supply Building, one of the town's few remaining landmarks. Ethel Coal Company employed 184 men in 1915; nearly half of the labor force was immigrants, with the largest group being from Hungary. Italians were also employed and 1/6 of the work force were African-Americans. Ethel Coal Company operated No. 1, No. 2, and No. 3 in 1917.

=== Logan Coal Company ===
Logan Coal Company operated Logan No. 1, situated at the mouth of Ethel Hollow, from 1908 to 1916. Logan Coal Company employed few immigrants; in 1911 and 1912, no immigrants were employed at the Logan No. 1 mine. In 1916, Ethel Coal Company took over the lease of the Logan Coal Company and its Logan No. 1 mine.

=== Cleveland Cliffs Iron Company ===
Cleveland Cliffs Iron Company took over the lease of Ethel Coal Company and operated Ethel No. 1, No. 2, No. 3 (the latter located at the mouth of Ethel Hollow) from 1918 to 1929. It was the only out-of-state coal company to operate at Ethel and it was the most efficient: in 1925, it produced 525,628 tons with only 224 men (2,346 tons per man). The Great Depression essentially shut down all of its operations.

=== Battle of Blair Mountain ===
Ethel, situated at the base of Blair Mountain, played a role in the story of the Battle of Blair Mountain. Logan County Sheriff Don Chafin set up field posts at various points along the defensive line, including one post at Cleveland Cliffs Company Store No. 2 at the mouth of Ethel Hollow. On August 27, 1921, a force of over 200 state police troopers and deputies under the command of Captain J.R. Brockus set out from the Ethel post for Beech Creek on the union side of Spruce Fork Ridge in order to serve warrants on certain union leaders. The route was likely either up the Left Fork of Dingess Run (Ethel Hollow) to Pine Fork and then along Spruce Fork Ridge to Beech Creek (in which case Brockus would have passed the Ethel Coal Company Supply Building) or up the Right Fork of Dingess Run, then up the graded road to Blair Mountain northward along Spruce Fork Ridge and down Beech Creek.

On August 28, 1921, John L. Rice, an employee of the Logan Mining Company, shot State Police private George Duling near the Ethel Coal Company Supply Building. Duling was shot in the head while he sat on the Club House porch. Sheriff Don Chafin arrested Rice but determined the killing to have been an accident.

The supply building served as a staging area for defensive forces in the battle.

=== 1920s ===
In 1923, Ethel was populated by 2000 residents, featured a Methodist Episcopal church, and was accessed by the Dingess Run Branch of the C&O Railroad. J.H. Cress served as postmaster and express agent; mail was received daily. Businesses included Central Amusement Company, Cleveland Cliffs Iron Company, Ethel Cleaning and Pressing Company, Ethel Theatre, Georges Creek Coal Company, Illinois Commercial and Mining Company, Logan Mining Company, Rex Coal Company, and Wood Coal Company. Dr. W.T. McClellan and Dr. E.B. Thompson served the community.

During the 1920s, Ethel had a high school.

=== Ethel Block Coal Company ===
Ethel Block Coal Company took over the Cleveland Cliffs lease in 1931 and operated No. 2 mine until 1932.

=== Chilton Block Coal Company ===
In 1933, Chilton Block Coal Company took over the Ethel Block Coal Company lease for No. 2 mine until 1941. No. 1 mine was reopened in 1935 and operated until 1941. The combined production of No. 1 and 2 mines reached 408,857 tons in 1941 (983 tons per man), well below what was accomplished by Cleveland Cliffs. During the 1933-1941 period, several structures were demolished, such as the No. 1 mining plant, the No. 1 mine tipple, and the No. 1 powerhouse. In 1941, Chilton Block Coal Company went into bankruptcy.

=== Chilton Coal Company and A.T. Massey Coal Company, Inc. ===
A.J. McCalla, a Charleston banker who was named receiver for Chilton Block, managed the company's affairs until 1944 when he formed the Chilton Coal Company to manage the mine. He likewise managed Ethel Chilton Mines, Inc., organized in 1942, to operate the No. 1 mine. This latter company absorbed Chilton Coal Company in 1946. McCalla directed this company until 1949 when A.T. Massey Coal Company, Inc. became the exclusive sales agency for Ethel Chilton Mines. Massey handled the product until 1962 when the mines closed.

=== Recent decades ===
In 1962, C.F. Colley, who had served as store manager for Ethel Chilton Mines, Inc. since 1951, leased a small parcel from the Dingess-Rum Coal Company that included the Ethel Coal Company Supply Building. He operated Colley Equipment Company, which bought used mine equipment and machinery, reconditioned it in the stone building, then resold it. He leased the building until 1986. In 1987, Cook Electric Maintenance Company leased the building for two years.

== Today ==
Only a few structures remain from Ethel's earlier days, namely the Ethel Coal Company Supply Building and ruins of Ethel No. 1 Company Store. Ethel Post Office is located near the mouth of Bearwallow Branch. Bearwallow Trailhead, opened in 2000 as part of the Hatfield-McCoy ATV Trail, is located in the headwaters of Bearwallow Branch.

== Notable person ==
John C. Gore (1873-1921), a deputy sheriff murdered by UMWA miners at Georges Creek, is buried at Ethel Cemetery on Mash Branch.
