= Sid Hatfield =

American police Chief, mining union activist

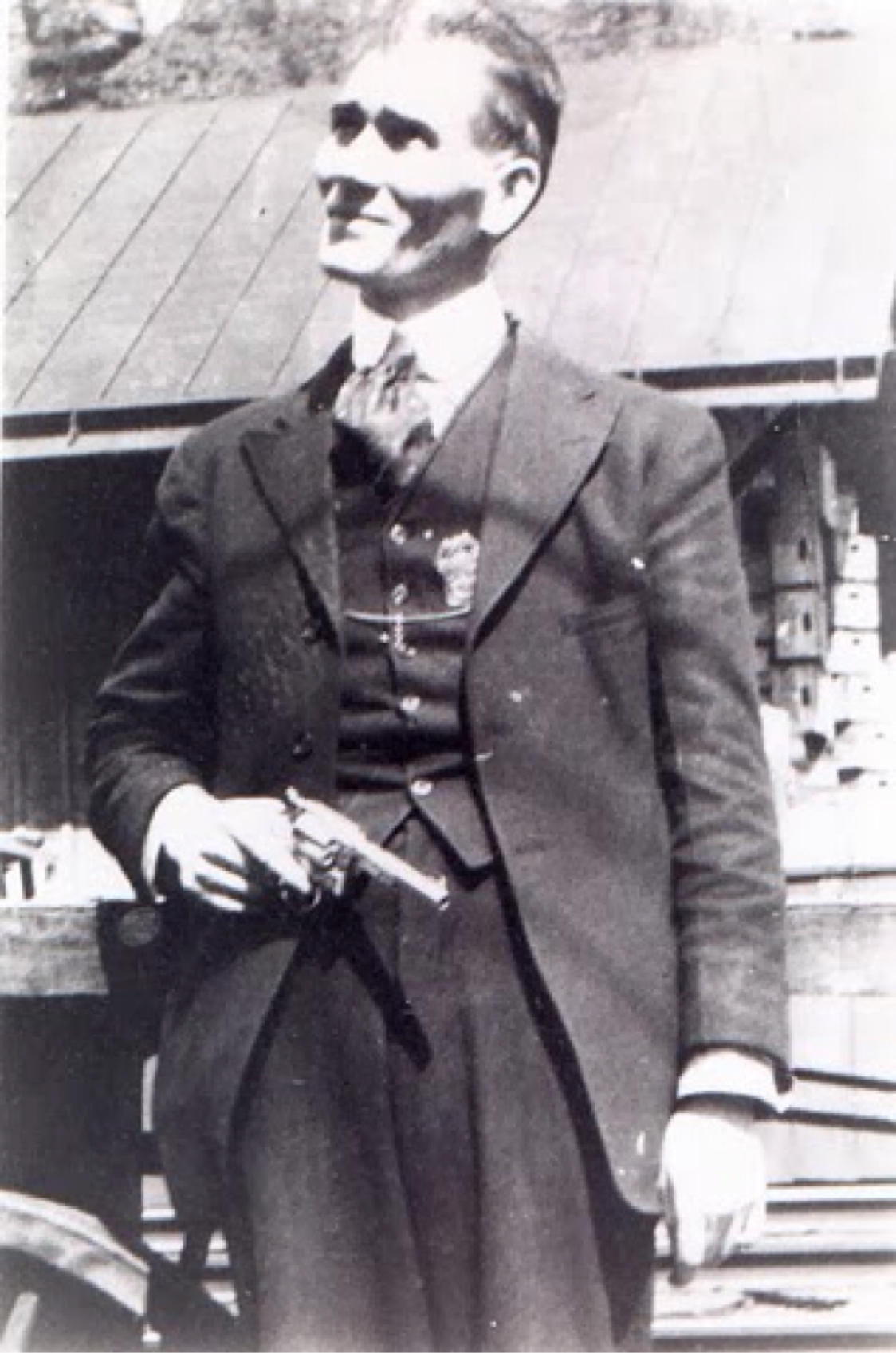
- Hatfield c. 1920
- Born: William Sidney Hatfield; May 15, 1891, or 1893; Pike County, Kentucky
- Died: August 1, 1921 (aged 28 or 30); Welch, West Virginia
- Cause of death: Gunshot wound
- Other names: Smilin' Sid, Two-Gun Sid
- Occupation: Police Chief of Matewan, West Virginia
- Years active: 1919–1921
- Known for: Participating in the Battle of Matewan
- Spouse: Jessie Lee Maynard (m. 1920)

William Sidney Hatfield (May 15, 1891, or 1893 – August 1, 1921), was a West Virginia law enforcement officer noted for his involvement in bitter labor disputes, on the side of labor, during the Coal Wars of the early 20th century.

Hatfield was police chief of Matewan, West Virginia during the Battle of Matewan, a shootout that followed a series of evictions carried out by detectives from the Baldwin–Felts Detective Agency. He was indicted on murder charges stemming from the conflict and was shot on the courthouse steps by Baldwin-Felts detectives.

== Biography ==
Hatfield was born in Blackberry, Pike County, Kentucky, the tenth of twelve children (of whom nine survived infancy) of Jacob Hatfield (c. 1843/45 – 1923), a tenant farmer, and his wife Rebecca Crabtree (b. circa 1856). His grandfather, Jeremiah Hatfield, was a half-brother to Valentine Hatfield (1789–1867), grandfather of William Anderson "Devil Anse" Hatfield, leader of the Hatfield family involved in the famous Hatfield–McCoy feud (see Hatfield family tree).

As a child, Hatfield worked on his father's farm. He became a miner in his teens, and then worked as a blacksmith for several years. He received his nickname, "Smilin' Sid", because of the gold caps on several of his upper teeth. He seems to have had a reputation for hard living and fighting, and his appointment in 1919 to the post of Police Chief of Matewan, by the mayor, Cabell Cornelis Testerman (1882–1920), surprised some of the more "respectable" townsfolk. However, he was a staunch supporter of the United Mine Workers of America, as was Testerman: together, they were instrumental in leading the mining community's resistance to the Baldwin–Felts operatives. Operatives offered both men substantial bribes to allow them to station machine guns in the town. Hatfield and Testerman refused. The Battle of Matewan was precipitated by the Baldwin–Felts agents' attempts to evict the families of unionized miners.

On June 2, 1920, in Huntington, he married Jessie Lee Maynard, the widowed second wife of Testerman, who had been mortally wounded in the battle. The speed of the marriage (they were married 11 days after Testerman's death, the morning after being arrested in a hotel room together and charged with having "improper relations") led to an attempt at arrest and accusations by Thomas Felts and the Baldwin–Felts spy, Charles Lively, that he, not Albert Felts, had shot the Mayor because of his desire for Jessie. However, according to Jessie, her first husband, aware of the danger of their situation, had asked that his friend take care of her and their young son, Jackson (1915–2001), should he be killed.

The battle had given Hatfield a degree of celebrity. He appeared in a short film, "Smilin' Sid", for the United Mine Workers (UMWA), and was photographed with other UMWA activists, including Mary Harris "Mother" Jones. However, he was aware that his life was in danger from Felts, who sought vengeance for his brothers Albert and Lee. He was indicted on murder charges stemming from the Matewan shootout but was later acquitted by the jury. He was sent to stand trial with his friend and deputy, Edward Chambers, on conspiracy charges for another incident, in Welch, West Virginia.

The conspiracy charges were based on an incident in Mohawk, West Virginia, located in McDowell County near the border of Mingo County. The mining camp of Mohawk was shot up, and according to the local mine guards, the perpetrators were Mingo County strikers led by Sid Hatfield and Ed Chambers, intending to force the Mohawk miners to unionize. According to Lively's secret testimony (leading to Hatfield's indictment), Lively had persuaded miners in his restaurant—as well as Hatfield and Chambers—to do something drastic: he encouraged the miners to arm themselves and shoot up the nonunion tipple at Mohawk. At this location, the mine guards had a reception committee waiting for them, with bloodhounds and machine guns, while Lively made himself busy on the telephone. The union leaders, on the other hand, argued that the shooting was done by McDowell County mine guards, and that they were attempting to falsely accuse Hatfield and Chambers of the offense in order to ambush them in McDowell County.

At the assurances of McDowell County sheriff W. J. "Bill" Hatfield, a distant relative of Sid Hatfield, Ed Chambers and Sid Hatfield were told that they would have the fullest protection of the sheriff's office. However, the day before the shooting at Mohawk, Sheriff Hatfield left the county for Craig Healing Springs in Virginia.

Both men arrived in Welch on August 1, 1921, unarmed and accompanied by their wives. Several Baldwin–Felts men shot them on the McDowell County Courthouse steps. Hit in the arm, and three or four times in the chest, Hatfield died instantly. Chambers was shot several more times, as his wife tried to defend him, and finished off with a bullet in the head by Charles Lively. None of the Baldwin-Felts detectives were ever convicted of Hatfield's assassination: they claimed they had acted "in self-defense". To this day, the bullet marks from the assassins are visible on the sandstone stairs of the courthouse.

There was an outpouring of grief for the fallen local heroes at the funeral, which was attended by at least 3,000 people, and conducted with full honors from the Odd Fellows, Knights of Pythias and Redmen (he was a member of all of these organizations).

== Legacy ==
Director John Sayles' Academy Award-nominated 1987 film Matewan starred David Strathairn in the role of Hatfield.

West Virginia: A Film History mistakenly identifies him as Albert Sidney Hatfield, as well as claiming that he was not related to "Devil Anse" Hatfield. This may be because of rumours that he was illegitimate, and so possibly not of Hatfield descent.

== See also ==
- Charles Lively (labor spy)
- List of worker deaths in United States labor disputes
