= Battle of Matewan =

1920 shootout in Matewan, West Virginia

Coordinates: 37.6231°N 82.1664°W

- Part of the West Virginia coal wars
- Date: May 19, 1920
- Location: Matewan, West Virginia, United States
- Result: A setback for miners' rights until the early 1930s when the Government finally recognized American labor unions. Eventual passage of the National Industrial Recovery Act of 1933

Parties
Matewan civilians; United Mine Workers of America	Baldwin–Felts Detective Agency

Lead figures
Sid Hatfield; Mayor Cabell Testerman †	Albert Felts †

Number
Deputy Fred Burgraff, local miners & residents	13 Baldwin–Felts detectives

Casualties and losses
Deaths: 3; two miners and Mayor Cabell Testerman	Deaths: 7; including Baldwin–Felts detectives brothers Albert and Lee Felts

The Battle of Matewan (also known as the Matewan Massacre) was a shootout in the town of Matewan in Mingo County and the Pocahontas Coalfield mining district, in southern West Virginia. It occurred on May 19, 1920, between local coal miners and their allies and the Baldwin–Felts Detective Agency. The dead included the detective agency's founder's two brothers and Matewan's mayor, Cabell Testerman, who supported the union.

== History ==
Employed by the Stone Mountain Coal Company, a contingent of the Baldwin–Felts Detective Agency arrived on the No. 29 morning train to evict families that had been living at the Stone Mountain Coal Camp on the outskirts of town. The detectives carried out several evictions before they ate dinner at the Urias Hotel and, upon finishing, they walked toward the train depot to catch the five o'clock train back to Bluefield, West Virginia. As the detectives made their way to the train depot, they were intercepted by Matewan Chief of Police Sid Hatfield, who claimed to have arrest warrants from the Mingo County sheriff. Hatfield, a native of the Tug River Valley, was a supporter of the miners' attempts to organize the UMWA in the southern coalfields of West Virginia. Detective Albert Felts and his brother Lee Felts then produced their own warrant for Sid Hatfield's arrest. Upon inspection, Matewan mayor Cabell Testerman claimed it was fraudulent.

Unbeknownst to the detectives, they had been surrounded by armed miners, who watched intently from the windows, doorways, and roofs of the businesses that lined Mate Street. Accounts vary as to who actually fired the first shot and the ensuing gun battle left seven detectives and three townspeople dead, including the Felts brothers and Testerman. The battle was hailed by miners and their supporters for the number of casualties inflicted on the Baldwin–Felts detectives. This incident, along with events such as the Ludlow Massacre in Colorado six years earlier, marked an important turning point in the battle for miners' rights.

=== Coal miners ===
At the time, the United Mine Workers of America had just elected John L. Lewis as their president. During this period, miners worked long hours in unsafe and dismal working conditions, while being paid low wages. Adding to the hardship was the use of coal scrip by the Stone Mountain Coal Company, because the scrip could only be used for those goods the company sold through their company stores. A few months before the battle at Matewan, union miners in other parts of the country went on strike, receiving a full 27 percent pay increase for their efforts. Lewis recognized that the area was ripe for change, and planned to organize the coal fields of southern Appalachia. The union sent its top organizers, including the famous Mary Harris "Mother" Jones. Roughly 3,000 men signed the union's roster in the spring of 1920. They signed their union cards at the community church, something that they knew could cost them their jobs, and in many cases their homes. The coal companies controlled many aspects of the miners' lives. Stone Mountain Coal Corporation fought back with mass firings, harassment, and evictions.

=== Town of Matewan ===
Matewan, founded in 1895, was a small independent town with only a few elected officials. The mayor at the time was Cabell Testerman, and the chief of police was Sid Hatfield. Both refused to succumb to the company's plans and sided with the miners. In turn, the Stone Mountain Coal Corporation hired their own enforcers, the Baldwin–Felts Detective Agency, dubbed the "Baldwin Thugs" by the miners. The coal operators hired them to evict the miners and their families from the company-owned houses. As a result, hundreds of miner families spent the spring of 1920 in tents. The assemblage of tents was known as Stony Mountain Camp Tent Colony.

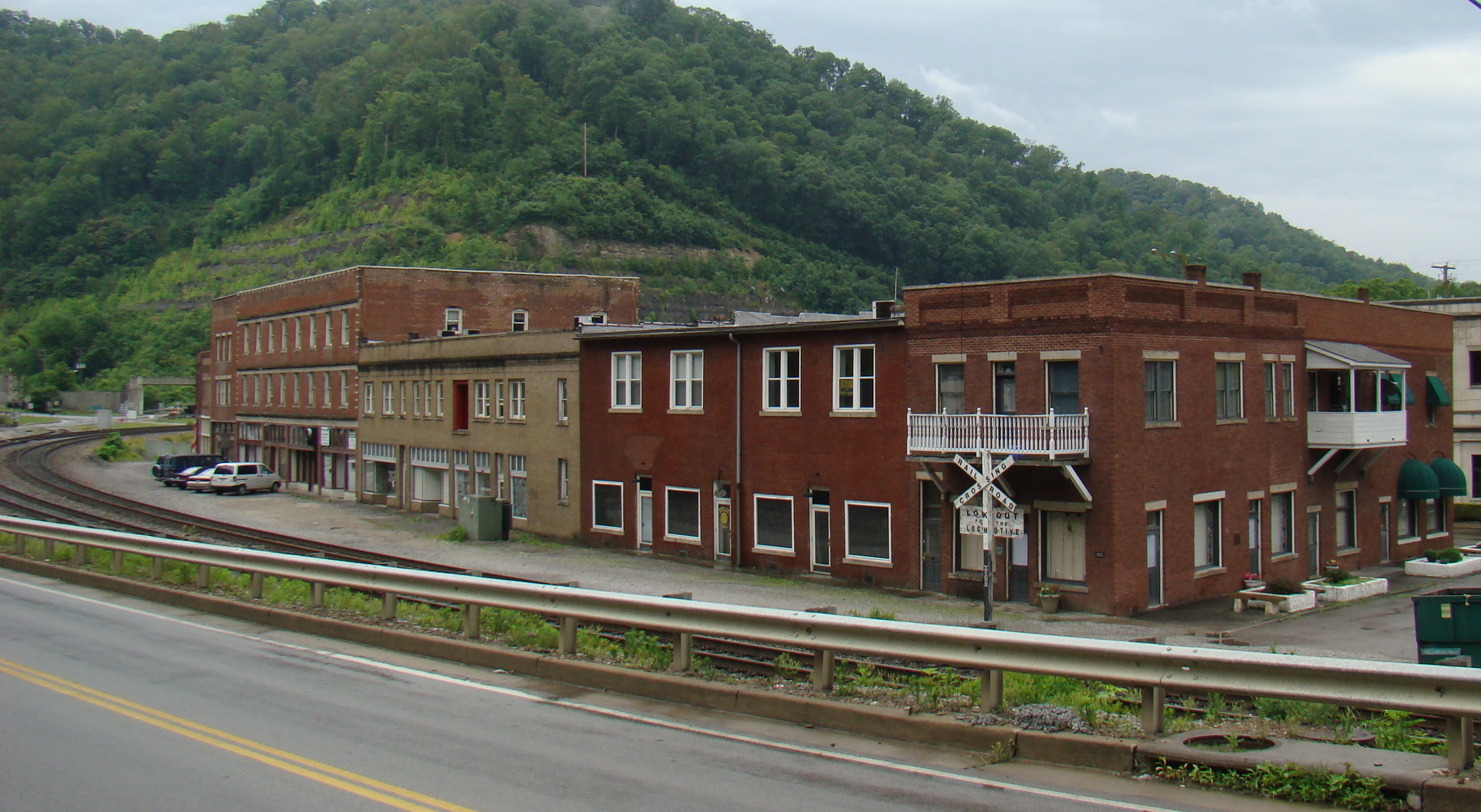
Modern-day Matewan, West Virginia

=== Battle ===
On the day of the fight, a group of the Baldwin–Felts enforcers arrived to evict families living at the mountain coal camp, just outside Matewan. The sheriff and his deputy, Fred Burgraff, sensed trouble and met the Baldwin–Felts detectives at the train station. News of the evictions soon spread around the town. When Sid Hatfield approached Felts, Felts served a warrant on Hatfield, which had been issued by Squire R. M. Stafford, a justice of the peace of Magnolia District, Mingo County, for the arrest of Hatfield, Bas Ball, Tony Webb and others. The warrant had been directed to Albert C. Felts for execution. Burgraff's son reported that the detectives had submachine guns with them in their suitcases.

Hatfield, Burgraff, and Mayor Cabell Testerman met with the detectives on the porch of the Chambers Hardware Store. It was then that Albert Felts fired from his coat pocket, mortally wounding Testerman, and then fired over his shoulder at Sid Hatfield, instantly killing a miner, Tot Tinsley. At this time, Sid Hatfield opened fire, killing Albert Felts. When the shooting finally stopped, there were casualties on both sides. Seven Baldwin–Felts detectives were killed, including Albert and Lee Felts. One more detective had been wounded. Two miners were killed: Tinsley and Bob Mullins, who had just been fired for joining the union; both were unarmed. Mayor Testerman died in hospital the next day from his gunshot wound. Four other bystanders were wounded.

=== Aftermath ===
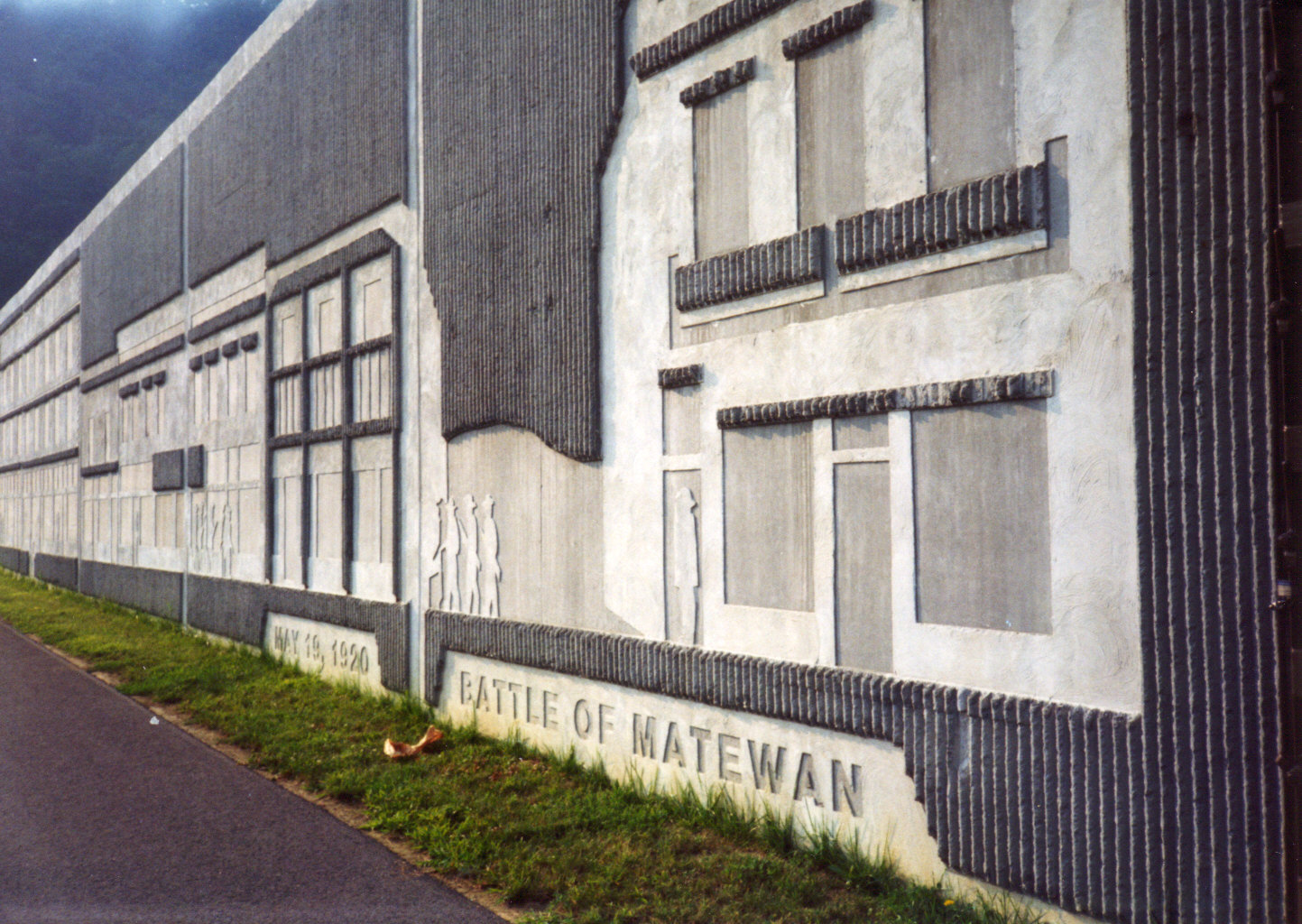
Section of Matewan's flood wall commemorating the Battle of Matewan

Governor John J. Cornwell ordered the state police force to take control of Matewan. Hatfield and his men cooperated, and stacked their arms inside the hardware store. The miners, encouraged by their success in getting the Baldwin–Felts detectives out of Matewan, improved their efforts to organize.

Hatfield and Testerman's widow, Jessie, were married twelve days after the May 19 shootout.

On July 1, the miners' union went on another strike, and widespread violence erupted. Railroad cars were blown up, and strikers were beaten and left to die by the side of the road.

The trial for the miners who killed the seven agents started January 26, 1921, and ended March 19, 1921, with all defendants being acquitted of all charges.

Tom Felts, the last remaining Felts brother, sent undercover operatives to collect evidence to convict Sid Hatfield and his men. When the charges against Hatfield and 22 others for the murder of Albert Felts were dismissed, Baldwin–Felts detectives assassinated Hatfield and his deputy Ed Chambers on August 1, 1921, on the steps of the McDowell County courthouse located in Welch, West Virginia. Of those defendants whose charges were not dismissed, all were acquitted.

Less than a month later, miners from the state gathered in Charleston. They were even more determined to organize the southern coalfields, and began the march to Logan County. Thousands of miners joined them along the way, culminating in what was to become known as the Battle of Blair Mountain.

The headquarters of the Baldwin–Felts Detective Agency was the Urias Hotel and was destroyed in a fire in December 1992.

The Matewan Historic District was added to the National Register of Historic Places on April 27, 1993.

== Victims ==
Casualties

Mayor

- Cabell Cornelius Testerman (38)

Detectives

- Andrew Jackson Booher (44)
- Charles Butchard Cunningham (45)
- Albert Creed Felts (42)
- LeGrand Crockett "Lee" Felts (47)
- Charles Troy Higgins (44)
- John Wesley Ferguson (41)
- Emmitt Owen Powell (37)

Miners

- Robert "Bob" Mullins (53)
- Clarence McKinley "Tot" Tinsley (19)

== Historic interpretations ==
The Matewan massacre is officially recognized by a Historic Highway marker produced by the West Virginia Division of Culture and History. The marker is located off Main Street in Matewan.

The marker reads:

MATEWAN MASSACRE. In 1920 area miners went on strike to gain recognition of UMWA. On May 19 of the same year, twelve Baldwin–Felts Agency guards came from Bluefield to evict the miners from company houses. As guards left town, they argued with town police chief Sid Hatfield and Mayor Testerman. Shooting of undetermined origins resulted in the deaths of two coal miners, seven agents, and the mayor. None of the 19 men indicted were convicted.

== In media ==
- The battle was the subject of the 1987 John Sayles film Matewan.
- Sid Hatfield was featured in Smilin' Sid which was a silent movie that portrayed Sid Hatfield as a hero and was shown in union mining camps.
- Terror of the Tug, a 2000 play by Jean Battlo, covers the violent events that occurred directly afterward.
- The battle features in Glenn Taylor's 2008 novel The Ballad of Trenchmouth Taggart. In the book, it is Trenchmouth Taggart that shoots Al Felts when Felts draws a gun to shoot Sid Hatfield. Felts then accidentally shoots Mayor Testerman. Trenchmouth also shoots and kills Lee Felts.
- The battle receives prominent mention in Eric Flint's science fiction novel 1632, the starting point of his Ring of Fire series.
- The battle plays an important role in the 2024 novel Rednecks by Taylor Brown.

== See also ==
- Coal Wars
- Coal mining in Appalachia
- Union violence
- Labor spying in the United States
- List of incidents of civil unrest in the United States
- List of worker deaths in United States labor disputes
- West Virginia Mine Wars Museum
