= Rum Creek (West Virginia) =

Stream in West Virginia, U.S.

Coordinates: 37°48′48″N 81°56′12″W

Rum Creek is a stream in the U.S. state of West Virginia.

Rum Creek was named for an incident when a barrel of rum spilled in its waters.

== See also ==
- List of rivers of West Virginia
