= Gatewood, West Virginia =

Unincorporated community in West Virginia, US

Coordinates: 38°00′38″N 81°03′39″W

Gatewood is an unincorporated community in Fayette County, in the U.S. state of West Virginia. As a census-designated place, the population was 390 at the 2020 census.

The community was named after Elizabeth Gatewood Bibb, the wife of an early settler.
