= Matewan, West Virginia =

- Town
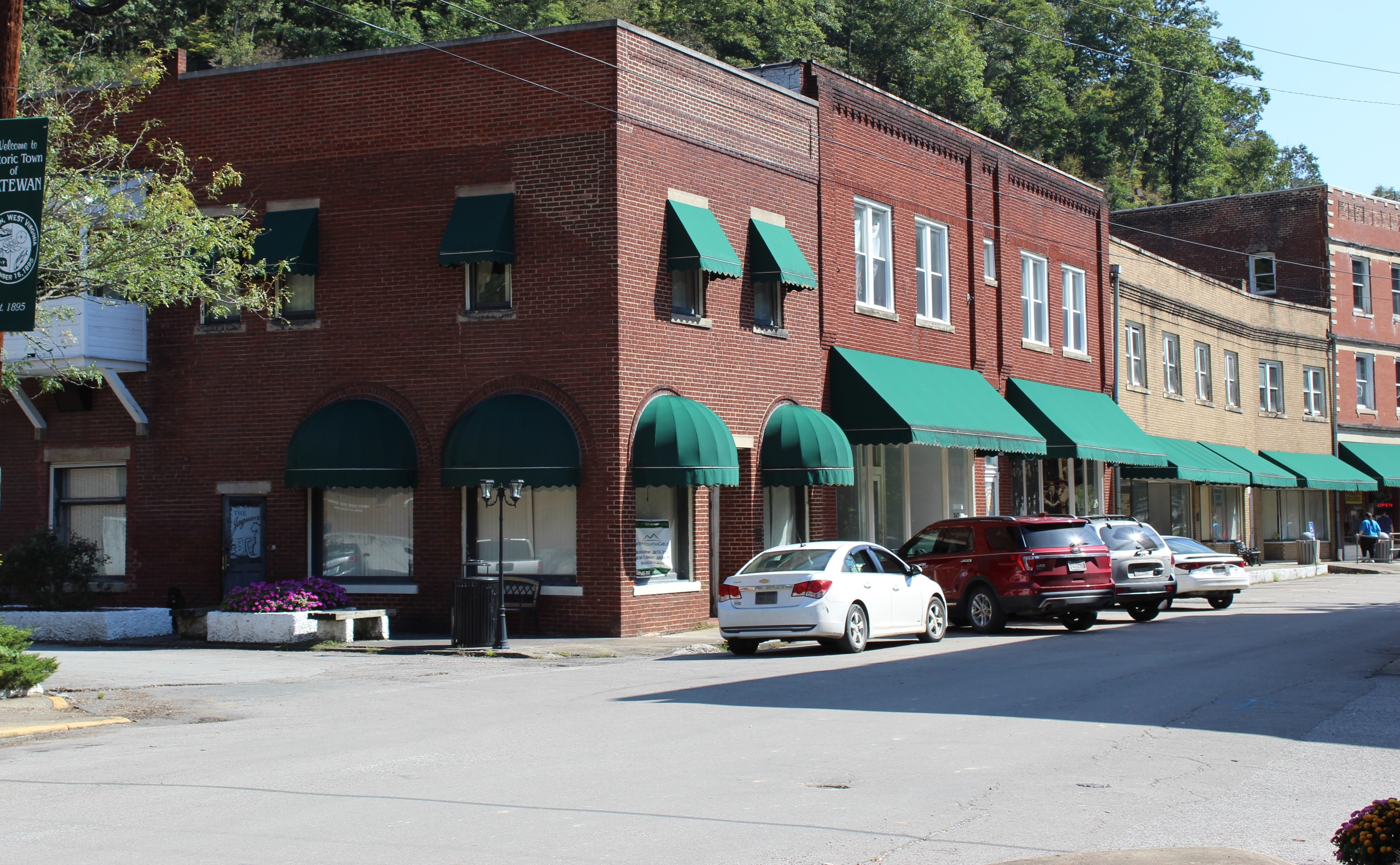
- Matewan, West Virginia.

- Location of Matewan in Mingo County, West Virginia.
- Coordinates: 37°37′23″N 82°9′59″W
- Country: United States
- State: West Virginia
- County: Mingo
- Incorporated: 1895

Government

Area
  - Total: 0.55 sq mi (1.43 km^{2})
  - Land: 0.55 sq mi (1.43 km^{2})
  - Water: 0 sq mi (0.00 km^{2})
- Elevation: 705 ft (215 m)

Population (2020)
  - Total: 412
- Time zone: UTC-5 (Eastern (EST))
  - Summer (DST): UTC-4 (EDT)
- ZIP code: 25678
- Area code: 304
- FIPS code: 54-52324
- GNIS feature ID: 1542862
- Website: https://matewanwv.gov/

Matewan (/ˈmeɪtwɒn/) is a town in Mingo County, West Virginia, United States at the confluence of the Tug Fork River and Mate Creek. The population was 412 at the 2020 census, down from 499 in 2010. The Norfolk Southern Railway's Pocahontas District passes through the town. It was a key site of the Coal Wars and the location of the Battle of Matewan in 1920.

== Geography ==
According to the United States Census Bureau, the town has a total area of 0.56 square miles (1.45 km^{2}), all land.

== Demographics ==
Historical population
Census	Pop.	Note	%±
1910	588		—
1920	851		44.7%
1930	932		9.5%
1940	905		−2.9%
1950	989		9.3%
1960	896		−9.4%
1970	651		−27.3%
1980	822		26.3%
1990	619		−24.7%
2000	498		−19.5%
2010	499		0.2%
2020	412		−17.4%
U.S. Decennial Census

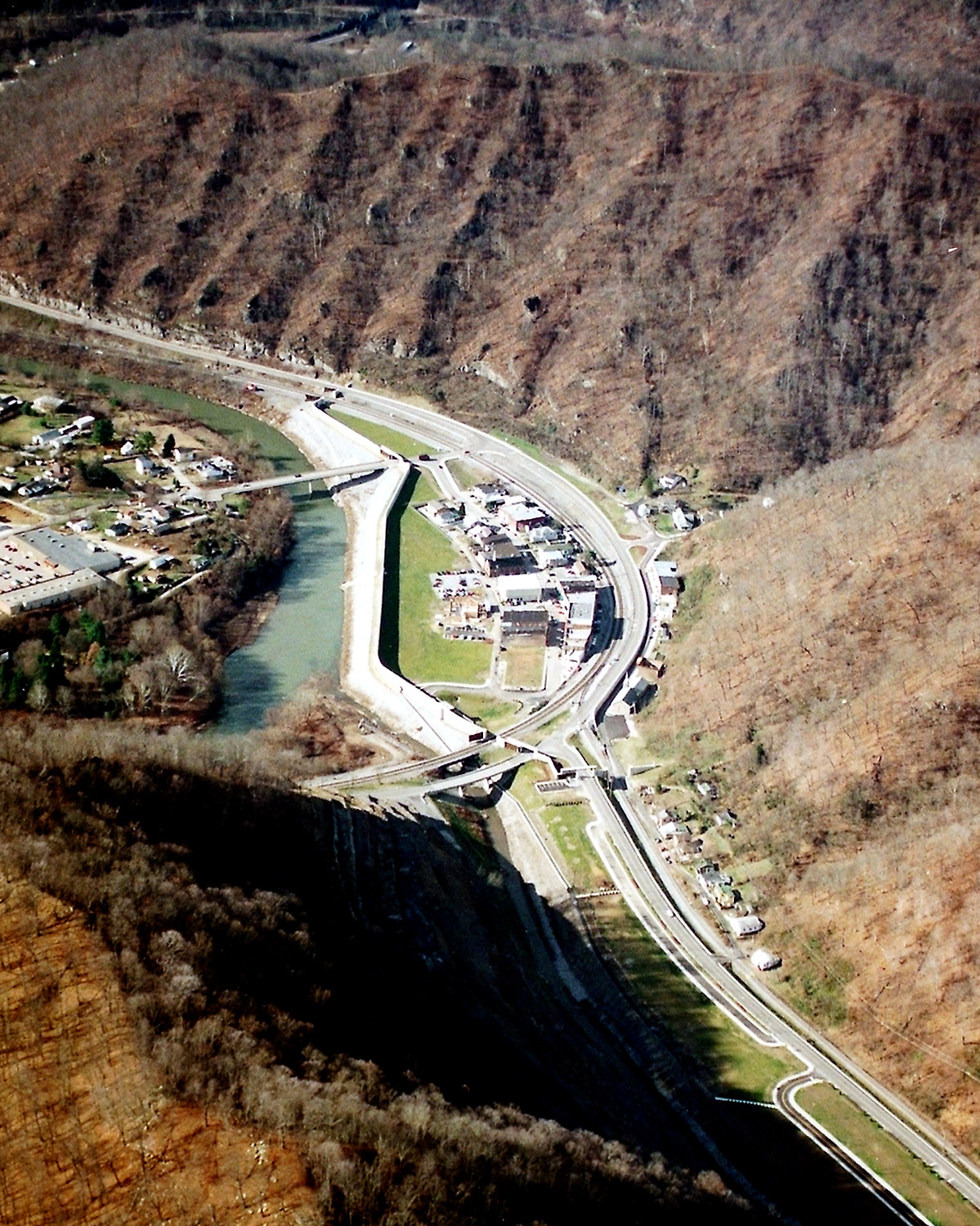
Aerial view of Matewan

=== 2010 census ===
At the 2010 census there were 499 people, 261 households, and 117 families living in the town. The population density was 891.1 inhabitants per square mile (344.1/km^{2}). There were 301 housing units at an average density of 537.5 per square mile (207.5/km^{2}). The racial makeup of the town was 91.6% White, 6.4% African American, 0.2% Native American, and 1.8% from two or more races. Hispanic or Latino of any race were 0.6%.

Of the 261 households 19.9% had children under the age of 18 living with them, 31.4% were married couples living together, 10.3% had a female householder with no husband present, 3.1% had a male householder with no wife present, and 55.2% were non-families. 52.5% of households were one person and 15.7% were one person aged 65 or older. The average household size was 1.91 and the average family size was 2.85.

The median age in the town was 45.4 years. 17.2% of residents were under the age of 18; 5.2% were between the ages of 18 and 24; 27.2% were from 25 to 44; 32.8% were from 45 to 64; and 17.4% were 65 or older. The gender makeup of the town was 42.5% male and 57.5% female.

=== 2000 census ===
At the 2000 census there were 498 people, 253 households, and 124 families living in the town. The population density was 989.2 inhabitants per square mile (384.6/km^{2}). There were 277 housing units at an average density of 550.2 per square mile (213.9/km^{2}). The racial makeup of the town was 94.78% White, 3.61% African American, 1.00% Native American, 0.20% Asian, and 0.40% from two or more races. Hispanic or Latino of any race were 1.00%.

Of the 253 households 18.6% had children under the age of 18 living with them, 36.4% were married couples living together, 8.7% had a female householder with no husband present, and 50.6% were non-families. 48.6% of households were one person and 13.4% were one person aged 65 or older. The average household size was 1.97 and the average family size was 2.87.

The age distribution was 17.7% under the age of 18, 6.8% from 18 to 24, 26.1% from 25 to 44, 28.9% from 45 to 64, and 20.5% 65 or older. The median age was 45 years. For every 100 females, there were 87.9 males. For every 100 females age 18 and over, there were 83.0 males.

The median household income was $13,529 and the median family income was $27,188. Males had a median income of $25,500 versus $21,875 for females. The per capita income for the town was $12,586. About 16.8% of families and 31.9% of the population were below the poverty line, including 35.0% of those under age 18 and 20.2% of those age 65 or over.

== History ==
"Mate Creek Post Office" was established on February 18, 1875. Early postmasters included Joseph Murphy (February 18, 1875) and Elias Hatfield (January 13, 1882). The latter was a brother to William Anderson "Devil Anse" Hatfield, father to future West Virginia governor Henry Drury Hatfield, and participant in the Hatfield-McCoy Feud.

By 1885, Mate Creek PO was discontinued and replaced by "Sidney Post Office". Elliot Rutherford, a Logan County sheriff, was postmaster beginning on September 3, 1885.

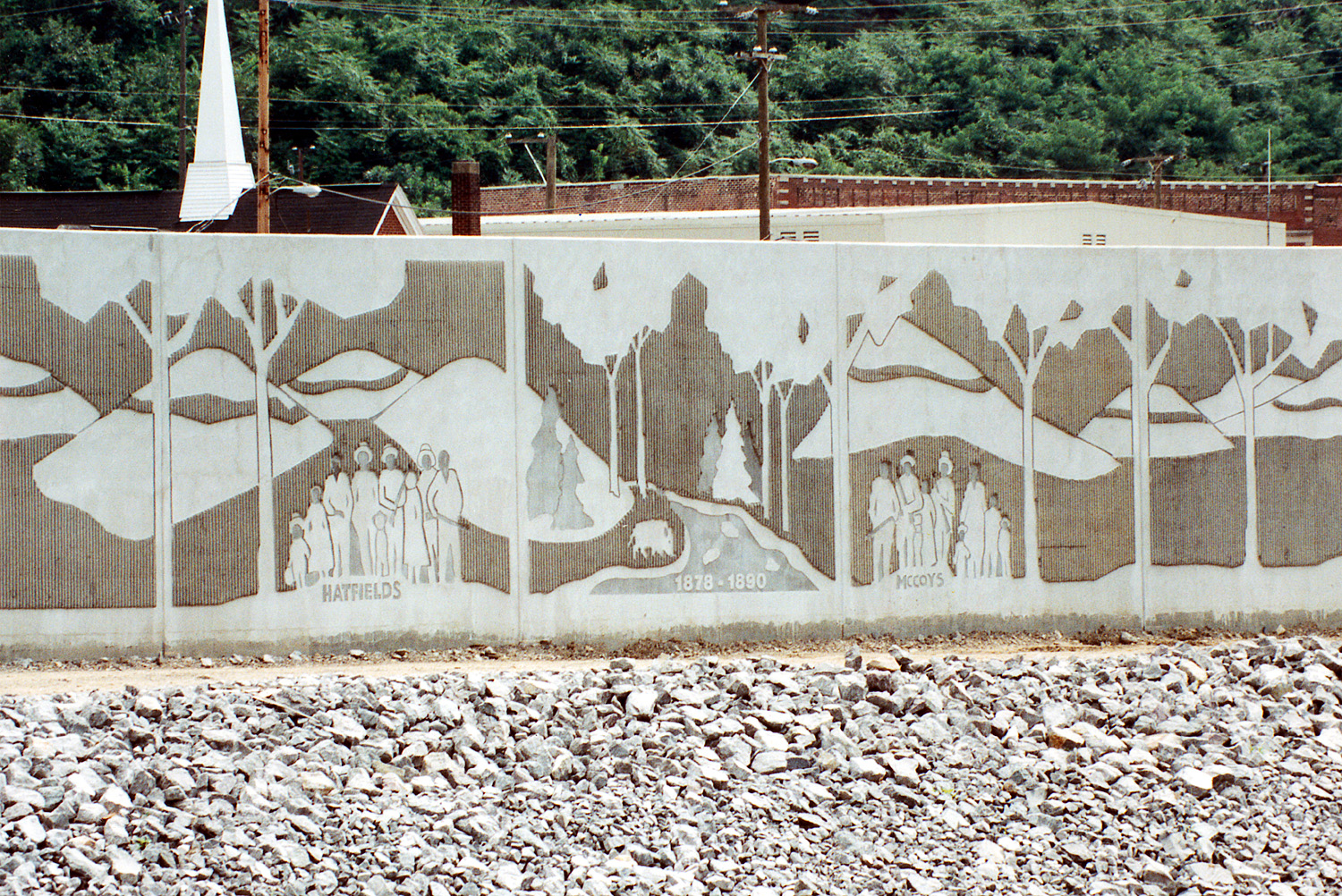
The floodwall along the Tug Fork River in Matewan depicts the Hatfield-McCoy feud

In 1890, Erskine Hazard, a civil engineer from the Norfolk and Western Railway, laid out the town and drafted the first map of the community. The town was named after Matteawan (now called Beacon), a town in Dutchess County, Upstate New York. Local residents, however, changed the spelling and pronunciation. Early postmasters for Matewan included Elliot Rutherford (January 13, 1893), George R. Buskirk (May 1, 1894), George Bonzo (May 17, 1897), Mary White (December 23, 1904), A.L. Hatfield (January 26, 1915), Emma Chafin (August 2, 1921), Mary White (November 17, 1921), and Neville L. Chancey (June 20, 1930).

Attempts to unionize by coal miners in 1920 led to the Battle of Matewan between miners and Baldwin-Felts detectives, which was the inspiration for the 1987 movie Matewan. The town's history is on display at the Matewan Depot, which includes a small museum. The West Virginia Mine Wars Museum, housed in a building owned by the United Mine Workers of America, provides history for the mine wars.

== Notable people ==
- Sam Church, labor union leader
- John Hendricks, founder and former chairman of Discovery Communications; founder of CuriosityStream
- Sid Hatfield, police chief, famous for supporting miners in the Matewan Massacre

== Attractions ==
Because of its rich history (Hatfield-McCoy feud and Matewan Massacre), the center of the town was designated the Matewan Historic District, a National Historic Landmark. Interesting sights and tours can be had while visiting the town.

The Hatfield-McCoy Trails opened a trail head in Matewan. Trail Riders can now easily access the trail system while staying in town.
