= Mohawk, West Virginia =

Mohawk
- Unincorporated community
- Location within the state of West Virginia Mohawk (the United States)
- Coordinates: 37°30′17″N 81°54′54″W
- Country: United States
- State: West Virginia
- County: McDowell
- Elevation: 1,010 ft (310 m)
- Time zone: UTC-5 (Eastern (EST))
  - Summer (DST): UTC-4 (EDT)
- ZIP code: 24862
- Area codes: 304 & 681
- GNIS feature ID: 1689167

Mohawk is an unincorporated community in McDowell County, West Virginia, United States. Mohawk is 6 miles (9.7 km) west-northwest of Iaeger. Mohawk had a post office, which opened on December 8, 1903, and closed on June 27, 2009. The community was named after the Mohawk Indians.
