= Coal Wars =

Series of armed labor conflicts in the US (1890 to 1930)

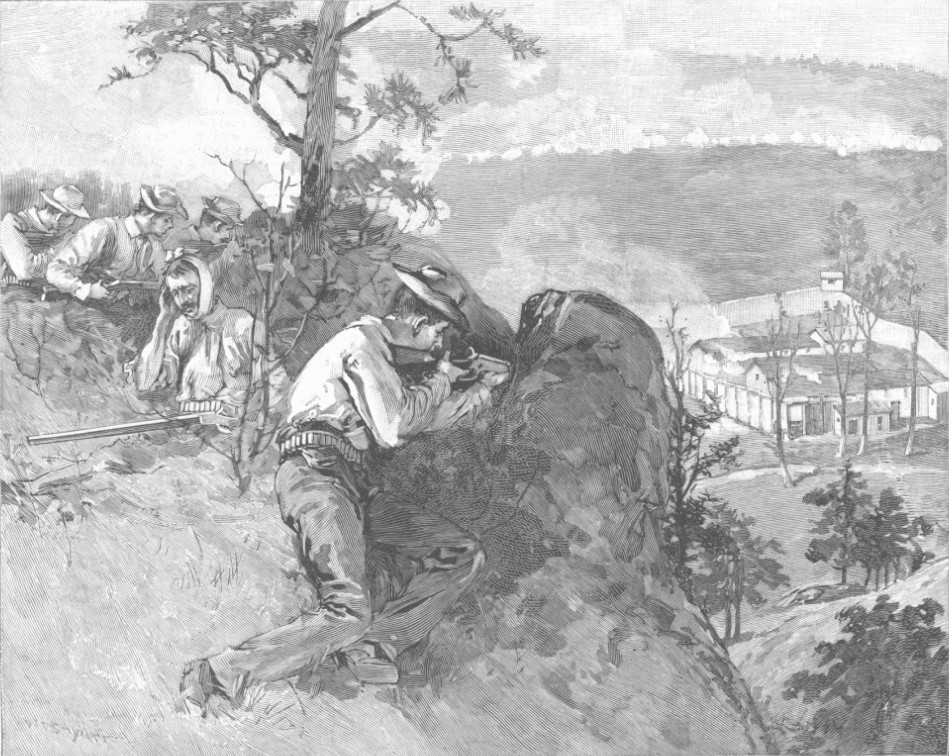
- Tennessee miners attacking Fort Anderson during the Coal Creek War in 1892.
- Date: c. 1890 – 1930
- Location: United States, especially West Virginia and Colorado
- Also known as: Coal Mine Wars

The Coal Wars were a series of armed labor conflicts in the United States, roughly between 1890 and 1930. Although they occurred mainly in the East, particularly in Appalachia, there was a significant amount of violence in Colorado after the turn of the century.

== History ==
The Coal Wars were the result of economic exploitation of workers during a period of social transformation in the coalfields. Beginning in 1870–1880, coal operators had established the company town system. Coal operators paid private detectives as well as public law enforcement agents to ensure that union organizers were kept out of the region. In order to accomplish this objective, agents of the coal operators used intimidation, harassment, espionage and even murder. Throughout the early 20th century, coal miners attempted to overthrow this system and engaged in a series of strikes, including the Paint Creek–Cabin Creek strike of 1912, and the Battle of Evarts, which coal operators attempted to stop through violent means. Mining families lived under the terror of Baldwin–Felts detective agents who were professional strikebreakers under the hire of coal operators. During that dispute, agents rode on a heavily armored train next to a tent colony at night, opening fire on women, men, and children with a machine gun. They would repeat this type of tactic during the Ludlow Massacre in Colorado the next year, with even more disastrous results.

By 1920, the United Mine Workers of America (UMWA) organized most of West Virginia and Colorado. The southern West Virginia coalfields, however, remained non-unionized bastions of coal operator power. In early 1920, UMW president John L. Lewis targeted Mingo County for organizing. Certain aspects of Mingo made it more attractive to union leaders than neighboring Logan County, which was under the control of the vehemently anti-union Sheriff Don Chafin and his deputized army. Mingo's political structure was more independent, and some politicians were pro-union. Cabell Testerman, the mayor of the independent town of Matewan was one supporter of the union cause. He appointed 27-year-old Sid Hatfield as town police chief. As a teenager, Hatfield had worked in the coalmines and he was sympathetic to the miners' condition. These men provided union organizers an opportunity to gain a foothold, and unionizing accelerated rapidly in the county.

In response to the organizing efforts, coal operators used every means to block the union. One of their primary tactics of combating the union was firing union sympathizers, blacklisting them, and evicting them from their homes. Their legal argument for evictions is best stated by S.B. Avis, a coal company lawyer; "It is like a servant lives at your house. If the servant leaves your employment, if you discharge him, you ask him to get out of the servants' quarters. It is a question of master and servant." The UMW set up tent colonies for the homeless miner families, and soon a mass of idle and angry miners was concentrated in a small area along the Tug Fork River. Even with the coal operators' suppression, by early May 3,000 out of 4,000 Mingo miners had joined the union. At the Stone Mountain Coal Company mine near Matewan, every single worker unionized, and was subsequently fired and evicted.

== West Virginia coal wars ==
The coal wars of the late nineteenth to early twentieth century were a particularly important part of West Virginia's State History. The Paint Creek–Cabin Creek strike of 1912 involved numerous labor leaders, including Mary Harris Jones, also known as "Mother" Jones. The next major event of the mine wars in West Virginia was the Matewan Massacre on May 19, 1920. The massacre only exacerbated tensions between miners, their allies, and coal operators. In West Virginia, the mine wars would come to a head at the Battle of Blair Mountain in 1921. This armed conflict pitched organized miners against detectives, policemen, and eventually, the United States Army. The result of the battle was a loss for the West Virginia miners, and the crushing of organized labor aspirations in the state. Miners would not be allowed to organize again until the 1930s.

== See also ==
- Battle of Blair Mountain
- Cripple Creek miners' strike (1894)
- Coal strike of 1902
- Copper Country strike (1913–1914)
- UMW General coal strike (1922)
- Colorado Coal Strike (1927–1928)
- Harlan County War (1931–1939)
- Colorado Labor Wars
- Illinois coal wars (1898–1900)
- Railroad Wars
- Range war
- Sheep Wars
- Molly Maguires
- List of worker deaths in United States labor disputes

== Sources ==
- Bailey, Rebecca (2008). Matewan Before the Massacre: Politice, Coal, and the Roots of Conflict in a West Virginia Mining Community. Morgantown: West Virginia University Press.
- Corbin, David (2011). Gun Thugs, Rednecks, and Radicals: A Documentary History of the West Virginia Mine Wars. Oakland: PM Press.
- Corbin, David, ed. (1998). The West Virginia Mine Wars: An Anthology. Martinsburg, WV: Appalachian Editions. ISBN 978-0-9627486-0-8.
- Savage, Lon (1990). Thunder in the Mountains: The West Virginia Mine War, 1920–21. Pittsburgh: University of Pittsburgh Press. ISBN 978-0-8229-3634-3.
- Shogan, Robert (2004). The Battle of Blair Mountain: The Story of America's Largest Union Uprising. Boulder, CO: Westview Press. ISBN 978-0-8133-4096-8.
