= Baldwin–Felts Detective Agency =

American private detective firm (1890s–1937)

The Baldwin–Felts Detective Agency was a private detective agency in the United States from the early 1890s to 1937. The agency's members played a key role in the events that led to the Battle of Blair Mountain in 1921 and violent repression of labor union members. Significant incidents, later collectively known as the Coal Wars, occurred in various locations. The Pocahontas Coalfield region of West Virginia witnessed some of these events. Among these incidents are the Paint Creek–Cabin Creek strike of 1912 in West Virginia, 1913–1914 Colorado Coalfield War (which notably included the Ludlow Massacre in 1914), and the Battle of Matewan in 1920.

The agency was founded in the early 1890s by William Gibbony Baldwin as the Baldwin Detective Agency.

== Formation ==
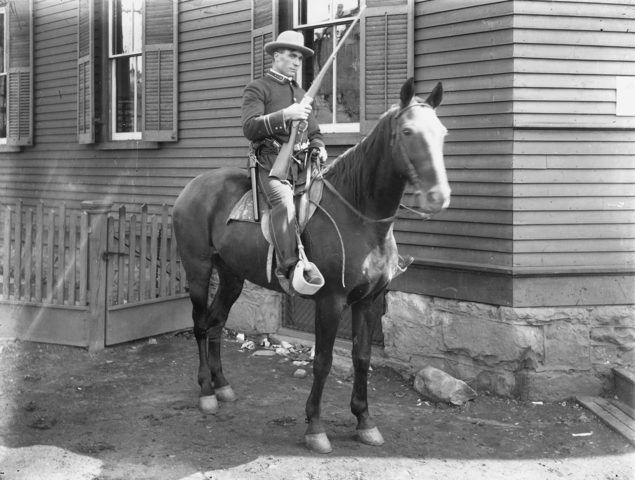
A Baldwin Felts agent at Glen Jean, Fayette County, 1902.

Baldwin, the senior member of the firm, was a native of Tazewell County, Virginia. An avid reader of detective novels in his youth, Baldwin was a small storekeeper in his early days. He then studied dentistry but left that profession to become a detective. He began his career in 1884 with the Eureka Detective Agency in Charleston, West Virginia. After founding the Baldwin Detective Agency, he then moved to Roanoke, Virginia, to oversee security operations in the Norfolk and Western Railway's coalfield district. He was later appointed chief special agent, a position he held until his retirement, in 1930.

Thomas Lafayette Felts was a native of Galax, Virginia, who was educated as a lawyer and was a member of the Virginia Bar Association. In 1900, he joined the Baldwin Detective Agency as a partner who could provide legal advice to the firm. In 1910, the name of the agency was changed to the Baldwin–Felts Detective Agency, and its headquarters were in Roanoke, Virginia, with a secondary office in Bluefield, West Virginia.

Originally, the company provided investigative services to railroads for train robberies and other crimes. Little is known about this chapter in the history of Baldwin–Felts, but it is known that the company provided guards for railway and mine payrolls and accompanied coal trains into the coalfields. The company investigated train wrecks, robberies, and thefts. By the early 1900s, the agency had also undertaken detective work for both federal and state government agencies.

== National prominence ==
The agency rose to national prominence with the pursuit and capture of the fugitive Floyd Allen and members of his family who were involved in a courtroom shootout in Carroll County, Hillsville, Virginia. Five people died and seven were wounded, including Commonwealth's Attorney William Foster, Sheriff Lewis F. Webb, and Judge Thornton Lemmon Massie. The event was reported nationally from March 13 to April 15, 1912.

At the time, Virginia law required the local sheriff to head the criminal investigation and pursue those suspected of committing the killings. No provision for succession after his death had been provided for in the law, and his deputies lost all their legal powers until the next election. Recognizing the need for immediate action, assistant clerk S. Floyd Landreth sent a telegram to Democratic Governor William Hodges Mann which read:

Send troops to the County of Carroll at once. Mob violence, the court. Commonwealth's Attorney, Sheriff, some jurors and others shot on the conviction of Floyd Allen for a felony. Sheriff and Commonwealth's Attorney dead, court serious. Look after this now.

Governor Mann phoned the Baldwin–Felts Detective Agency in Roanoke and asked them to hunt down the Allens who were still at large. The detectives cut a wide swathe through Carroll County in their quest. The wounded Allen was arrested at his hotel by Felts personally. Most of the Allens and their relations were arrested by a posse of Baldwin–Felts detectives, who chased down the fugitives in a relentless search that was carried out regardless of weather conditions. Nevertheless, two of the men (Sidna Allen and Wesley Edwards) escaped to Des Moines, Iowa. An informant (Maude Iroller) tipped the agency as to the men's whereabouts, and the fugitives were arrested and brought back to Carroll County before the end of the year.

== Strike breakers ==
By the 1910s, railroad crimes and associated banditry had decreased in the United States. Therefore, Baldwin–Felts began hiring out their detectives as private security forces for mining companies and so the company is remembered for its violent confrontations with the labor unions.

Baldwin–Felts was allowed to maintain such operations because public law enforcement and the maintenance of order in labor disputes were often left to company owners. Therefore, they could employ the likes of Baldwin–Felts to suppress strikes; collect intelligence on unions; prevent labor organizers from entering company grounds; and evict the families of union members living in company-owned housing who had gone on strike or failed to pay rent.

In 1912, Baldwin–Felts agents were soon employed strikebreaking in West Virginia at the Pocohantas Coal Fields and the Paint Creek–Cabin Creek. Their thuggish behaviour and their known propensity for violence led the former Attorney General of West Virginia, Howard B. Lee, to remark in his 1969 book that Baldwin and Felt were the "two most feared and hated men in the mountains."

Between 1913 and 1914, Baldwin–Felts agents had moved west and become involved in another coal field struggle in Las Animas County, Colorado. Agency detectives were employed in squads to harass striking workers. They used an armored car with a mounted machine gun (it was called the Death Special by the miners). Charles Lively, who infiltrated the UMWA in West Virginia and other states, was tasked with spying on the miners in Colorado and killed a man, for which he pleaded self-defense. The events culminated in the violent confrontation known as the Ludlow Massacre, when the Colorado National Guard used machine guns to kill 21 people, including miners' wives and children.

=== Battle of Matewan ===
The most infamous striking breaking action undertaken by the Baldwin–Felts was in Matewan, West Virginia. A confrontation between locals and agents resulted in the deaths of two miners and Matewan's Mayor as well as seven Baldwin–Felts detectives including Thomas Felts' brothers, Albert and Lee.

On May 19, 1920, 12 Baldwin–Felts agents, including Lee Felts, arrived in Matewan, West Virginia and met with Albert Felts, who was already in the area. Albert and Lee were the brothers of Thomas Felts, the co-owner and director of the agency. Albert had already been in the area and had tried to bribe Mayor Testerman with $500 to place machine guns on roofs in the town; Testerman refused. That afternoon Albert and Lee along with 11 other men set out to the Stone Mountain Coal Co. property. The first family they evicted was a woman and her children; the woman's husband was not home at the time. They forced them out at gunpoint and threw their belongings in the road under a light but steady rain. The miners who saw it were furious, and sent word to town.

As the agents walked to the train station to leave town, Police Chief Sid Hatfield and a group of deputized miners confronted them and told them they were under arrest. Albert Felts replied that in fact he had a warrant for Hatfield's arrest. Testerman was alerted, and he ran out into the street after a miner shouted that Sid had been arrested. Hatfield backed into the store and Testerman asked to see the warrant. After reviewing it, the mayor exclaimed, "This is a bogus warrant." With these words, a gunfight erupted and Hatfield shot Albert Felts. Testerman and Albert and Lee Felts were among the ten men killed (three from the town and seven from the agency). Albert and Lee Felts were buried in Galax, Virginia in what is now the Felts Memorial Cemetery. Their funeral was attended by over 3,000 people.

This gunfight became known as the Matewan Massacre, and its symbolic significance was enormous for the miners. The seemingly invincible Baldwin–Felts had been beaten. Sid Hatfield became an immediate legend and hero to the union miners, and a symbol of hope that the oppression of coal operators and their hired guns could be overthrown. Throughout the summer and into the fall of 1920 the union gained strength in Mingo County, as did the resistance of the coal operators. Low-intensity warfare was waged up and down the Tug River. In late June state police under the command of Captain Brockus raided the Lick Creek tent colony near Williamson. Miners were said to have fired on Brockus and Martin's men from the colony, and in response the state police shot and arrested miners, ripped the canvas tents to shreds and scattered the mining families' belongings. Both sides were bolstering their arms, and Sid Hatfield continued to be a problem, especially when he converted Testerman's jewelry store into a gun shop.

On January 26, 1921, the trial of Hatfield for killing Albert Felts began. It was in the national spotlight and brought much attention to the miners' cause. Hatfield's stature and mythical status grew as the trial proceeded. He posed and talked to reporters, fanning the flames of his own legend. All men were acquitted in the end, but overall the union was facing significant setbacks. Eighty percent of mines had reopened with the importation of replacements and the signing of yellow-dog contracts by ex-strikers returning to the mines. In mid-May 1921 union miners launched a full-scale assault on non-union mines. In a short time the conflict had consumed the entire Tug River Valley. This "Three Days Battle" was finally ended by a flag of truce and the implementation of martial law. From the beginning, the miners perceived the enforcement of martial law as one-sided. Hundreds of miners were arrested; the smallest of infractions could mean imprisonment, while those on the side of "law and order" were seen as immune. The miners responded with guerrilla tactics and violence.

In the midst of this tense situation, Hatfield traveled to McDowell County on 1 August 1921 to stand trial on charges of dynamiting a coal tipple. Along with him traveled a good friend, Ed Chambers, and their wives. As they walked up the courthouse stairs, unarmed and flanked by their wives, a group of Baldwin–Felts agents standing at the top of the stairs opened fire. Hatfield was killed instantly. Chambers was bullet-riddled and rolled to the bottom of the stairs. Despite Sally Chambers' protests, one of the agents (Charles Lively) ran down the stairs and shot Chambers once more, point blank in the back of the head. Hatfield's and Chambers' bodies were returned to Matewan, and word of the slayings spread through the mountains.

The miners were angry at the way Hatfield had been slain, and that it appeared the assassins would escape punishment. They began to pour out of the mountains and take up arms.

== Final years & closure ==
Both Baldwin and Felts were also involved in banking, and Baldwin later served as president and member of the board of directors of several banks. Felts was later elected to two terms as a Virginia state senator.

Baldwin died in 1936, at 75; Felts died a year later, at 69. In 1937, four months before his death, Felts had formally dissolved the Baldwin–Felts Detective Agency. By then, strikebreaking work had declined. State and federal legislation outlawing the use of private detectives for the purpose of spying on or harassing workers, along with shifting public opinion, had made such detectives less useful to management in labor disputes.

After the agency closed its doors, most of the company's files were destroyed or lost. The largest collection of extant files is housed at the Eastern Regional Coal Archives, in Bluefield, West Virginia.

== See also ==
- Anti-union violence
- Charles Lively (labor spy)
- Pinkerton (detective agency)
- Labor spying in the United States

== Sources ==
- Savage, Lon (1990). Thunder in the Mountains: The West Virginia Mine War, 1920–21. Pittsburgh: University of Pittsburgh Press. ISBN 978-0-8229-3634-3.
- Shogan, Robert (2004). The Battle of Blair Mountain: The Story of America's Largest Union Uprising. Boulder, CO: Westview Press. ISBN 978-0-8133-4096-8.
