= Coal camps in Mingo County, West Virginia =

The coal towns, or "coal camps" of Mingo County, West Virginia were situated to exploit the area's rich coal seams. Many of these towns were located in deep ravines that afforded direct access to the coal through the hillsides, allowing mined coal to be dropped or conveyed downhill to railway lines at the valley floor. Many of these encampments were set up as coal towns, and when their mines closed, the towns vanished. Mingo County covers the Williamson Coalfield and a small portion of the Logan Coalfield. Below is partial listing of known coal towns within the Williamson Coalfield and a small portion of the Logan Coalfield. Further listings are available here

== Williamson Coalfield ==
- Blocton
- Borderland (abandoned)
- Burch (abandoned)
- Cedar (abandoned)
- Chattaroy
- Cinderella
- Delbarton
- Glen Alum
- Greyeagle
- Kermit
- Lenore
- Lobata (abandoned)
- Matewan
- North Matewan
- Puritan Mines
- Ragland
- Rawl (abandoned)
- Red Jacket
- Sprigg (abandoned)
- Thacker
- Vulcan
- War Eagle
- Williamson

== Logan Coalfield ==
- Gilbert
- Tamcliff
