= National Register of Historic Places listings in Bibb County, Alabama =

Location of Bibb County in Alabama

This is a list of the National Register of Historic Places listings in Bibb County, Alabama.

This is intended to be a complete list of the properties and districts on the National Register of Historic Places in Bibb County, Alabama, United States. Latitude and longitude coordinates are provided for many National Register properties and districts; these locations may be seen together in a Google map.

There are six properties and districts listed on the National Register in the county.

This National Park Service list is complete through NPS recent listings posted January 2, 2026.

	Name on the Register	Image	Date listed	Location	City or town	Description
1	Blocton Italian Catholic Cemetery	Blocton Italian Catholic Cemetery	April 22, 1999 (#99000464)	Primitive Ridge Rd. 33°06′46″N 87°06′49″W	West Blocton	
2	Brierfield Furnace	Brierfield Furnace	November 20, 1974 (#74000401)	West of Brierfield; 33°02′41″N 86°55′45″W	Brierfield	
3	Centreville Historic District	Centreville Historic District	October 19, 1978 (#78000482)	Walnut St., East and West Court Sq. 32°56′41″N 87°08′13″W	Centreville	
4	Davidson-Smitherman House	Davidson-Smitherman House	January 6, 1988 (#87001552)	167 3rd Ave. 32°56′34″N 87°08′01″W	Centreville	
5	Sarah Amanda Trott McKinney House	Sarah Amanda Trott McKinney House	May 29, 1992 (#92000626)	State Route 25 between Montevallo and Centreville; 33°00′25″N 87°00′18″W	Sixmile	
6	Montebrier	Montebrier	April 2, 1973 (#73000331)	North of Brierfield on Mahan Creek; 33°02′32″N 86°54′11″W	Brierfield	

== See also ==
- List of National Historic Landmarks in Alabama
- National Register of Historic Places listings in Alabama
