= Blocton =

Blocton may refer to:

- Blocton, West Virginia
- West Blocton, Alabama
- Blocton Italian Catholic Cemetery, a cemetery in West Blocton, Alabama
