= Bibb County Airport =

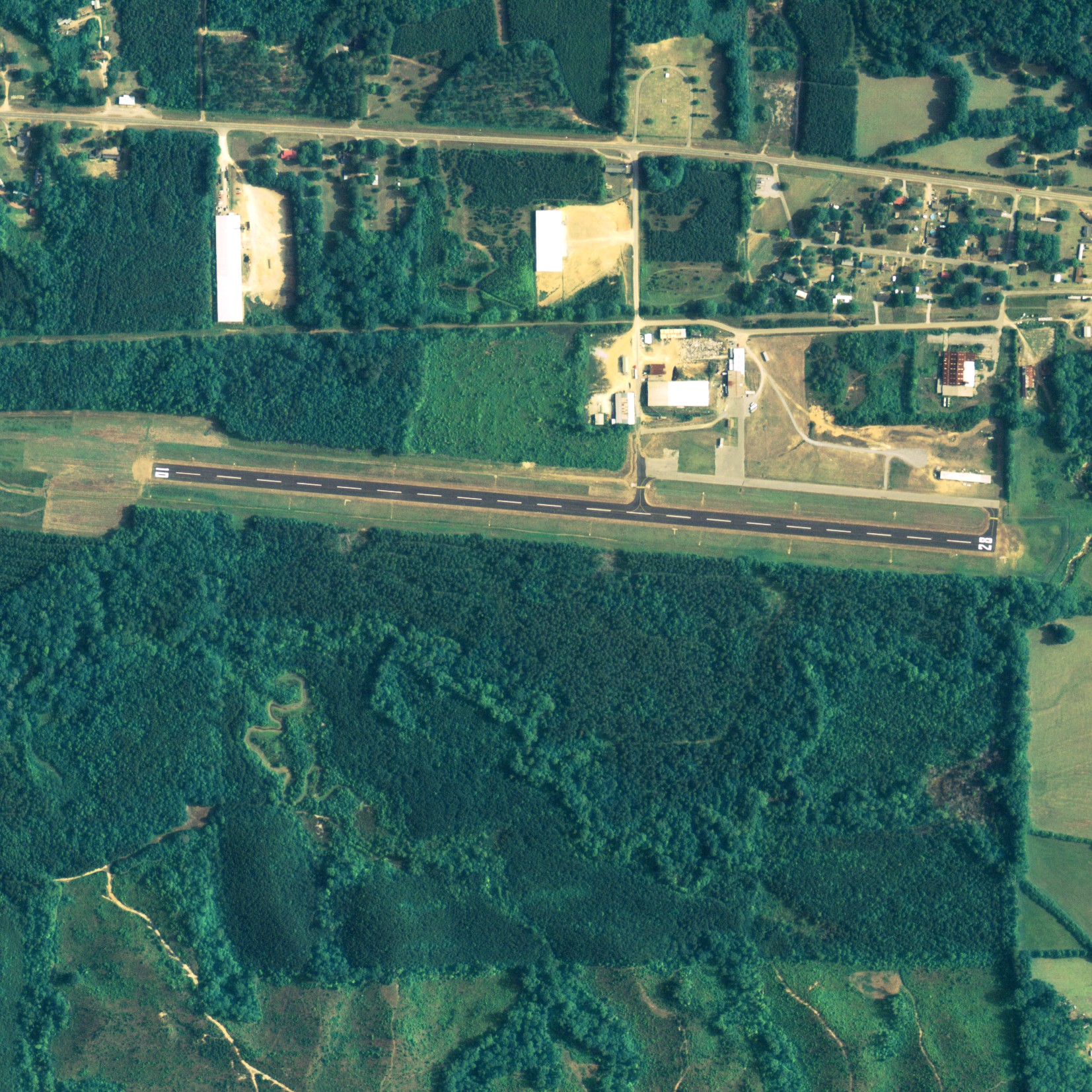
- NAIP aerial image, 29 June 2006
- IATA: none; ICAO: none; FAA LID: 0A8

Summary
- Airport type: Public
- Owner: Bibb County
- Serves: Bibb County, Alabama
- Location: Centreville, Alabama
- Elevation AMSL: 251 ft (77 m)
- Coordinates: 32°56′13″N 087°05′26″W
- Interactive map of Bibb County Airport

Runways
Direction	Length		Surface
Direction	ft	m	Surface
10/28	4,206	1,280	Asphalt

Statistics (2017)
- Aircraft operations (2016): 3,542
- Based aircraft: 11
- Source: Federal Aviation Administration

Bibb County Airport (FAA LID: 0A8) is a county-owned public-use airport in Bibb County, Alabama, United States. It is located 3 nautical miles (6 km) east of the central business district of Centreville, Alabama. According to the FAA's National Plan of Integrated Airport Systems for 2009–2013, it is categorized as a general aviation facility.

== Facilities and aircraft ==
Bibb County Airport covers an area of 56 acres (0.09 sq mi; 0.23 km^{2}) which contains one runway designated 10/28 is 4,200 x 80 feet (1,280 x 24 meters) asphalt pavement. For the 12-month period ending May 30, 2006, the airport had 3,600 general aviation/military aircraft operations.

== See also ==
- List of airports in Alabama
