= Grey Eagle =

Gray Eagle, Grey Eagle, or Greyeagle may refer to:

== Places in the United States ==
- Grey Eagle, Minnesota, a small city
- Grey Eagle Township, Todd County, Minnesota, the city's township
- Greyeagle, West Virginia, an unincorporated community
- Gray Eagle Creek, a tributary of the Middle Fork Feather River, California
- Gray Eagle Creek, near Graeagle, California

== Nickname ==
- Vermont Garrison (1915–1994), United States Air Force flying ace nicknamed "the Gray Eagle", having flown in combat in World War II, the Korean War and the Vietnam War
- Robert H. Milroy (1816–1890), Union Army general during the American Civil War nicknamed "the Gray Eagle"
- Tris Speaker (1888–1958), American Major League Baseball Hall-of-Fame player nicknamed "the Gray Eagle"

== Other uses ==
- Grey Eagle (sternwheeler), an American sternwheel-driven steamboat in use from 1894 to 1930
- Gray Eagle Award, presented to the US Naval Aviator who has served on continuous active duty the longest
- General Atomics MQ-1C Gray Eagle, an unmanned aerial vehicle used by the United States Army
- Grayeagle, a 1977 American Western film directed Charles B. Pierce
- Gray Eagle, a figure in Haida Gwaii mythology
