= Franklin Potts Glass Sr. =

American journalist

Franklin Glass
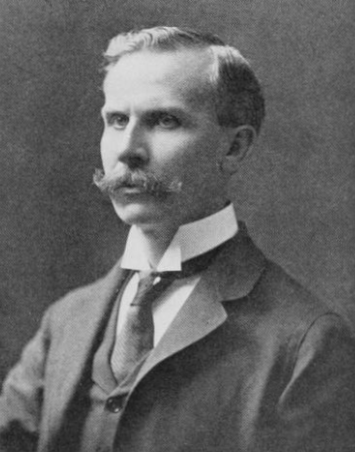

Personal details
- Born: Franklin Potts Glass Sr. June 7, 1858; Centreville, Alabama, U.S.
- Died: January 10, 1934 (aged 75); Birmingham, Alabama, U.S.
- Political party: Democratic
- Education: Princeton University (BA, MA)

Franklin Potts Glass Sr. (June 7, 1858 – January 10, 1934) was an American Democratic politician, newspaper publisher, editor, and United States Senator-Designate from Alabama.

== Background ==
Glass was born on June 7, 1858, in Centreville, Alabama, to Benjamin F. Glass and Caroline Potts Glass. Glass graduated from Princeton University in 1877, and received his master's degree there in 1880. Returning to Alabama, he founded the newspaper the Bibb Blade in Bibb County, Alabama, in 1880. In 1881, Glass bought the Selma Daily News in Selma, Alabama. He bought a share of the Montgomery Advertiser in Montgomery, and became the editor and publisher. Glass eventually moved to Birmingham, where he was the editor and publisher of the Birmingham News.

== Appointment to the United States Senate ==
United States Senator Joseph F. Johnston died in office, on August 8, 1913. Alabama Governor Emmet O'Neal appointed Glass to the United States Senate. Glass was a Democrat. However, on February 4, 1914, the United States Senate voted 32-31 to uphold the Committee of Elections and Privileges recommendation to deny Glass a seat, because the recent ratification of the Seventeenth Amendment to the United States Constitution supported Alabama state law that the Governor of Alabama had to call a special election to fill the vacancy.

== Railroad Labor Mediation Board ==
In 1933, President Franklin Roosevelt appointed Glass to the Railroad Labor Mediation Board. While traveling from Washington D.C. to Memphis, Tennessee, to hear railroad mediation cases, Glass caught a cold. He died in Birmingham, Alabama, on January 10, 1934, as a result of the cold.

== Personal life ==
Glass married Mattie Byrd Purnell, who died in September 1933; he was survived by three sons and three daughters.
