= Bibb County Courthouse =

Bibb County Courthouse may refer to:

- Bibb County Courthouse (Georgia), Macon, Georgia
- Bibb County Courthouse (Alabama), Centreville, Alabama
