= Bibb County School District =

Bibb County School District may refer to:

- Bibb County School District (Alabama)
- Bibb County School District (Georgia)
