= Alabama State Route 209 =

State highway in Alabama, United States

State Route 209

Route information
- Maintained by ALDOT
- Length: 0.325 mi (523 m)
- Existed: 1962–2015

Major junctions
- South end: SR 58 in Centreville
- North end: US 82 / SR 25 in Centreville

Location
- Country: United States
- State: Alabama
- Counties: Bibb

Highway system
- Alabama State Highway System; Interstate; US; State
← SR 208	→ SR 210

State Route 209 (SR 209) was a 0.325-mile (0.523 km) state highway that serves as a connection between downtown and SR 58 to U.S. Route 82 (US 82) and SR 25 in Centreville in central Bibb County, Alabama.

== Route description ==
SR 209 began at its intersection with SR 58 in the central business district of Centreville. The route continued in a northerly direction past the Bibb County Courthouse prior to turning in a northwesterly direction, along SR 25, en route to its northern terminus at US 82/SR 6/SR 25. The highway followed the following streets: Market Street, Court Square, Valley Street, and (while concurrent with SR 25) Montevallo Road.

== History ==
State Route 209 was decommissioned in August 2015, along with State Route 58, when US 82 was rerouted, and SR 382 was created.

== Major intersections ==
The entire route is in Centreville, Bibb County.

mi	km	Destinations	Notes
0.000	0.000	SR 58 (Walnut Street)	Southern terminus
0.308	0.496	SR 25 south (Montevallo Road) – Brent	Southern end of SR 25 concurrency
0.325	0.523	US 82 / SR 25 Truck south (SR 6) / SR 25 north (Montevallo Road) – Tuscaloosa, Wilton, Maplesville	Northern terminus of SR 209 and SR 25 Truck
1.000 mi = 1.609 km; 1.000 km = 0.621 mi: Concurrency terminus
