= Bibb County Courthouse (Alabama) =

- U.S. Historic district – Contributing property
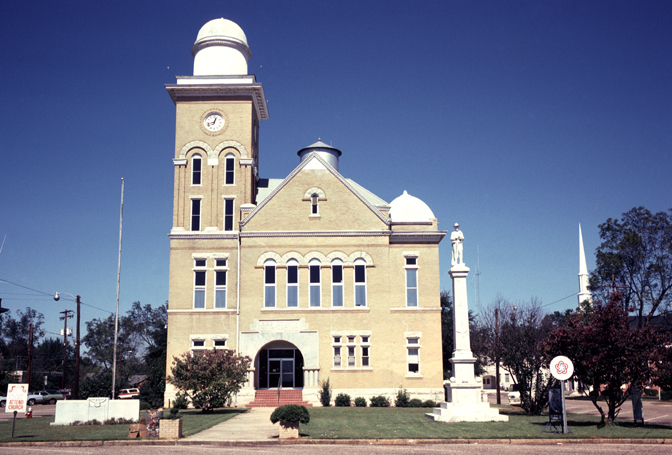
- Bibb County Courthouse

- Location within Alabama Location within the United States
- Interactive map showing the location of Bibb County Courthouse
- Location: Centreville, Alabama
- Coordinates: 32°56′44″N 87°08′08″W
- Built: 1902
- Part of: Centreville Historic District (ID78000482)
- Designated CP: October 19, 1978

Bibb County Courthouse is a historic county courthouse in Centreville, Alabama, county seat of Bibb County, Alabama. It was built in 1902.

== See also ==
- List of county courthouses in Alabama
- National Register of Historic Places listings in Bibb County, Alabama
