= WBIB (AM) =

Radio station in Centreville–Tuscaloosa, Alabama

- Centreville, Alabama; United States
- Broadcast area: Bibb County
- Frequency: 1110 kHz
- Branding: WBIB AM 1110 & FM 107.3

Programming
- Format: Southern gospel
- Affiliations: Salem Radio Network

Ownership
- Owner: James Deloach

History
- First air date: September 14, 1964
- Call sign meaning: "Bibb"

Technical information
- Licensing authority: FCC
- Facility ID: 56372
- Class: D
- Power: 1,000 watts (days only)
- Transmitter coordinates: 32°58′01″N 87°9′01″W
- Translator: 95.1 W236DX (Centreville)

Links
- Public license information: Public file; LMS

WBIB (1110 AM) is a radio station licensed to Centreville, Alabama, United States, and serving Bibb County. Owned by James Deloach, it airs a Southern gospel format with programming from the Salem Radio Network.

WBIB operates as a daytime-only station; programming is also relayed around the clock over low-power FM translator W236DX (95.1 FM).
