= Alabama State Route 58 =

State highway in Alabama, United States

State Route 58

Route information
- Maintained by ALDOT
- Length: 1.648 mi (2.652 km)
- Existed: 1959–2015

Major junctions
- West end: US 82 / SR 25 / SR 219 at Centreville
- East end: US 82 at Centreville

Location
- Country: United States
- State: Alabama
- Counties: Bibb

Highway system
- Alabama State Highway System; Interstate; US; State
| ← SR 57 | → I-59 |

State Route 58 (SR 58) was a 1.648-mile-long (2.652 km) state highway in Centreville in Bibb County. The western terminus of the highway was at an intersection with US 82/SR 25/SR 219. The eastern terminus of the highway was at a second intersection with US 82. SR 58 traveled through the historic business district of Centreville.

== Route description ==
SR 58 began at an intersection with former US 82/SR 6/SR 25/SR 219 (now SR 382) in Centreville, heading east on two-lane undivided Walnut Street. The highway headed into the historic business district of the town, intersecting former SR 209 at the town square. Farther east, the highway headed into wooded residential areas. SR 58 curved to the southeast and reaches its eastern terminus at an intersection with US 82/SR 6.

== History ==
State Route 58 was decommissioned in August 2015, along with State Route 209, when US 82 was rerouted, and SR 382 was created.

== Major intersections ==
The entire route was in Centreville, Bibb County.

| mi | km | Destinations | Notes |
|---|---|---|---|
| 0.000 | 0.000 | US 82 / SR 25 / SR 219 (Montgomery Road / Montevallo Road / Walnut Street / SR 6) | Western terminus |
| 0.188 | 0.303 | SR 209 north (Valley Street) | Southern terminus of SR 209 |
| 1.648 | 2.652 | US 82 (Montgomery Road / SR 6) – Montgomery, Tuscaloosa | Eastern terminus |
1.000 mi = 1.609 km; 1.000 km = 0.621 mi
