= WBHS =

WBHS may stand for:

- West Blocton High School in West Blocton, Alabama
- West Boca Raton Community High School in Boca Raton, Florida, United States
- Westlake Boys High School in Auckland, New Zealand
- Whangarei Boys' High School in Whangarei, New Zealand
- Westville Boys' High School in Westville, South Africa
- William Blount High School in Blount County, Tennessee, United States
- William Byrd High School in Roanoke County, Virginia
- Wednesbury Boys' High School in Wednesbury, England
- Wynberg Boys' High School in Cape Town, South Africa
- Whitley Bay High School in Whitley Bay, England
- West Bloomfield High School in West Bloomfield, Michigan, United States
- West Broward High School in west Pembroke Pines, Florida, United States
- Western Branch High School in Chesapeake, Virginia
- Western Brown High School in Mount Orab, Ohio
- WBHS-LP, a low-power radio station (104.9 FM) licensed to Brunswick, Georgia, United States
- WVEA-TV, a television station (channel 50 virtual/20 digital) licensed to Tampa, Florida, United States, which used the call signs WBHS or WBHS-TV from March 1988 to November 2001
- WBHS Channel 19, the Educational-access television cable TV Station for Belleville High School in Belleville, Michigan, United States
