= Sammie Lee Hill =

American football player (born 1986)

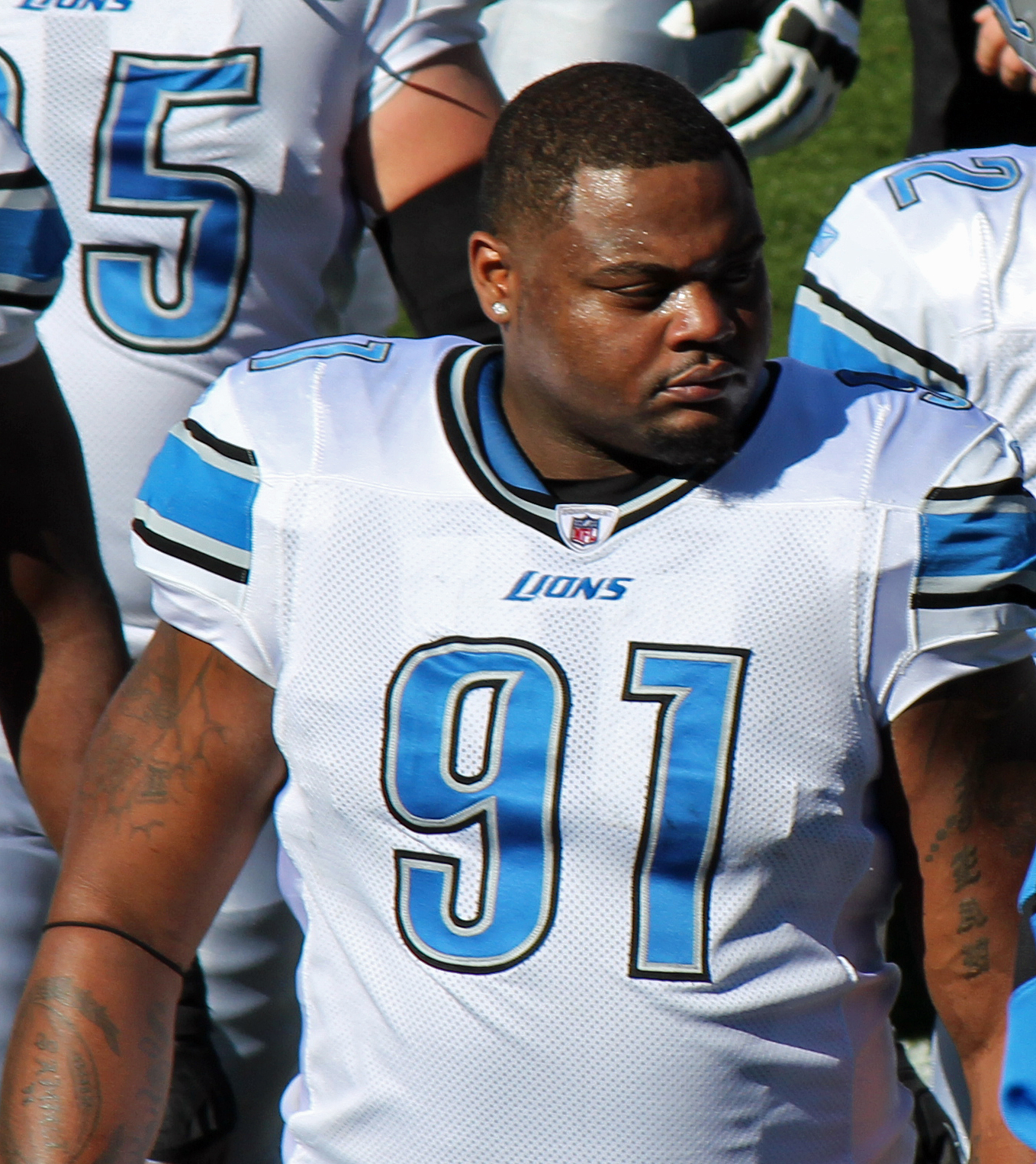
- Hill with the Detroit Lions in 2011

No. 79, 91, 94
- Position: Defensive tackle

Personal information
- Born: November 8, 1986 (age 39); West Blocton, Alabama, U.S.
- Listed height: 6 ft 4 in (1.93 m)
- Listed weight: 331 lb (150 kg)

Career information
- High school: West Blocton
- College: Stillman
- NFL draft: 2009: 4th round, 115th overall pick

Career history
- Detroit Lions (2009–2012); Tennessee Titans (2013–2015)

Awards and highlights
- 2× First-team All-SIAC (2007, 2008)

Career NFL statistics
- Total tackles: 165
- Sacks: 7
- Forced fumbles: 1
- Fumble recoveries: 5
- Stats at Pro Football Reference

Sammie Lee Hill (born November 8, 1986) is an American former professional football player who was a defensive tackle in the National Football League (NFL). He was selected by the Detroit Lions in the fourth round of the 2009 NFL draft. He played college football for the Stillman Tigers. He was also a member of the Tennessee Titans.

== Early life ==
Hill played high school football at West Blocton High School in West Blocton, Alabama.

== College career ==
He played at Stillman College in Tuscaloosa, Alabama from 2005 to 2008.

== Professional career ==
=== Detroit Lions ===
Hill was selected by the Detroit Lions in the fourth round of the 2009 NFL draft and was the first player from Stillman to be drafted.

=== Tennessee Titans ===
On March 13, 2013, Hill signed a three-year, $11.4 million contract, including $4 million guaranteed with the Tennessee Titans.
