= Montebrier =

Historic house in Alabama, United States

- U.S. National Register of Historic Places
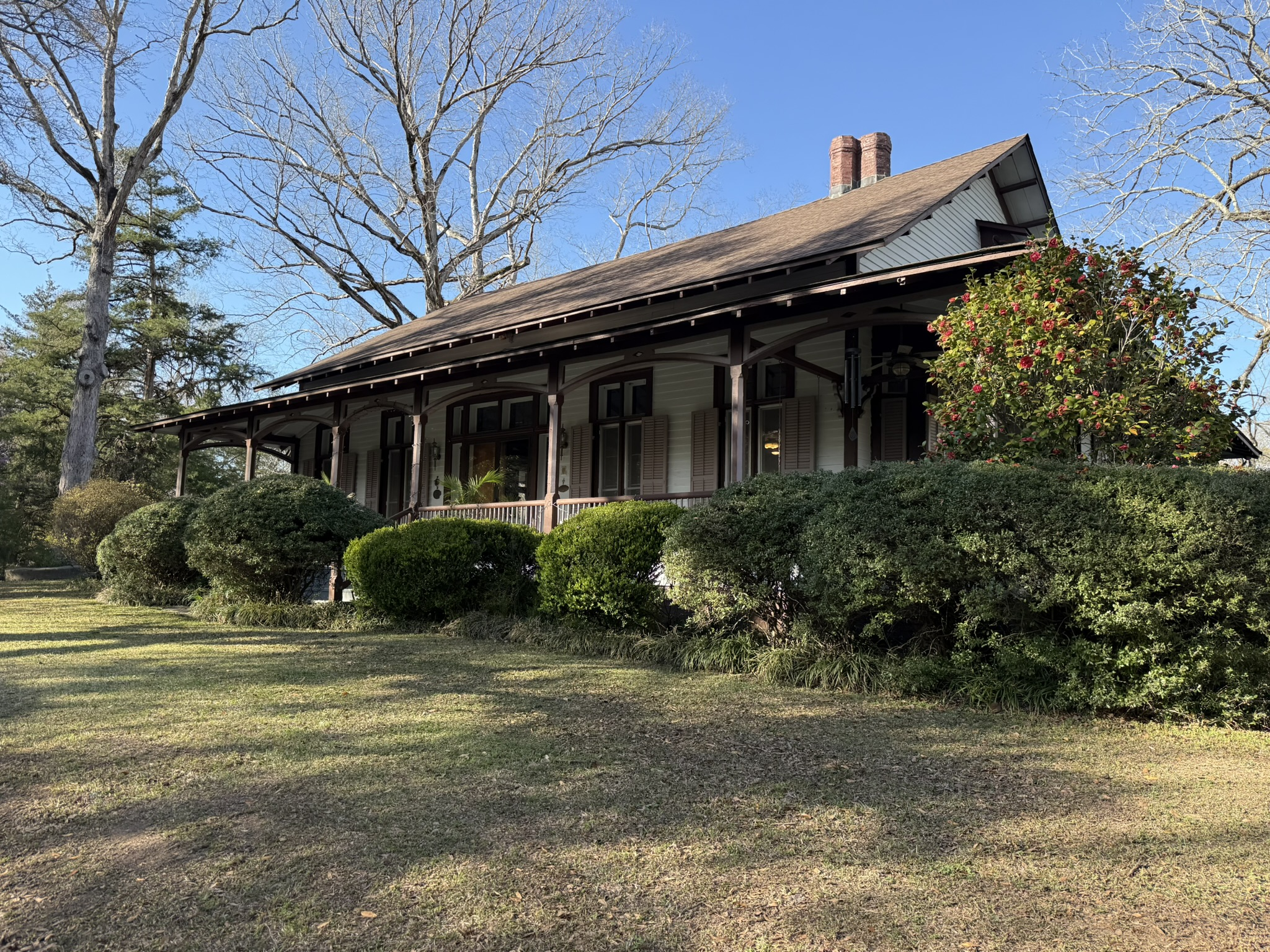
- Front view of Montebrier, a historic residence near Brierfield, Alabama.

- Location within Alabama Location within the United States
- Location: N of Brierfield on Mahan Creek, Brierfield, Alabama
- Coordinates: 33°2′33″N 86°54′17″W
- Area: 6 acres (2.4 ha)
- Built: 1866–67
- Built by: S. W. Mahan; Archimedes Mahan (carpenter)
- Architectural style: Cottage orné
- NRHP reference No.: 73000331
- Added to NRHP: April 2, 1973

Montebrier is a historic residence near Brierfield, Alabama, United States. Although a 2004 historical marker dates the house to 1866–67, the National Register of Historic Places nomination form documents that construction began in the early 1850s under S. W. Mahan and was not completed until after the Civil War. The house is associated with the postwar operations of the Brierfield Iron Works and with the family of Confederate ordnance chief Josiah Gorgas. Architecturally, Montebrier has been described both as an example of early domestic Gothic and as part of the picturesque cottage orné tradition. It was added to the National Register of Historic Places on April 2, 1973.

== History ==
According to the National Register nomination, construction of Montebrier began in the early 1850s under S. W. Mahan, with Archimedes Mahan serving as carpenter. The house was occupied by 1855, though work continued into the postwar period.

In 1866 Mahan sold the property to former Confederate Chief of Ordnance Josiah Gorgas for $320. Gorgas mortgaged the house the following year to trustees of the Brierfield Iron Works. Although Gorgas relocated to the University of the South in 1869, his wife Amelia and their children remained in Brierfield until June 1870. Their eldest son, future U.S. Surgeon General William Crawford Gorgas, spent part of his childhood at Montebrier.

Gorgas defaulted on the mortgage in 1880, and the trustees sold the property to C. C. Huckeby, a former official of the iron works. Huckeby later transferred the house to his daughter Anna McCalley.

A 2004 historical marker presents a simplified version of this chronology, dating construction to 1866–67 and emphasizing the Gorgas family’s residency.

During the 1920s the house was converted into a country club, a use that continued until the economic collapse of 1929, when the property was taken over by the Merchants and Planters Bank of Montevallo. In 1932 the house was purchased for back taxes by Alabama College sociology professor John Steelman, who later served as executive assistant to President Harry Truman. Steelman and his wife lived at Montebrier until their separation in 1938, after which she remained in the home until selling it to Ruby Lee Latham of Montgomery.

In 1962 Dr. and Mrs. S. M. Mahan acquired the property and undertook restoration of the exterior to its original appearance.

== Architecture ==
The National Register nomination describes Montebrier as “simple, early domestic Gothic,” citing its steep roof, wide eaves, veranda arches, and window treatments as features consistent with mid‑19th‑century Gothic Revival domestic design. The form notes that the house’s inspiration “could have easily been taken from A. J. Downing’s The Architecture of Country Houses.″

Architectural historian Robert S. Gamble offers a more restrained interpretation. In Historic Architecture in Alabama he places Montebrier within the broader cottage orné tradition, arguing that the house’s Gothic elements are limited and that its decorative treatment represents a modest picturesque upstyling rather than a fully developed Gothic Revival design.

== See also ==
- National Register of Historic Places listings in Bibb County, Alabama
