= Brookwood High School (Alabama) =

Location
- 12250 George Richmond Parkway; Brookwood, Alabama 35444; United States; 33.2576°N 87.3122°W

Information
- Type: Public
- Established: 1927 (99 years ago)
- School board: Tuscaloosa County School System
- CEEB code: 010530
- Principal: Aaron Tennyson
- Teaching staff: 61.00 (FTE)
- Grades: 9-12
- Enrollment: 1,094 (2023-2024)
- Student to teacher ratio: 17.93
- Campus type: Rural
- Colors: Crimson and White
- Slogan: Be Responsible. Be Respectful. Be Resourceful.
- Mascot: Panther
- Nickname: Bwood
- Rival: Holt High School, West Blocton High School, McAdory High School
- Yearbook: Pantheron
- Feeder schools: Brookwood Middle School (grades 6-8)
- Affiliation: warriormetcoal.com
- Website: brookwoodhigh.tcss.net

Brookwood High School is a high school in Brookwood, Alabama, in the United States and serves grades 9-12. It previously served grades 7-12 until 2002. It is the third largest high school in the Tuscaloosa County School System (TCSS). The school was established in 1927. Prior to 2014, the school was housed in a building designed by noted architect Don Buel Schuyler, who was a protege of Frank Lloyd Wright. In 2012, construction began on a new state-of-the-art building and was completed in 2013. The new high school opened to students at the beginning of 2014. During the fall of 2022, TCSS broke ground on a new football stadium that was funded through an $18.2 million grant from the Alabama Board of Education.

== History ==
=== Establishment ===
Brookwood High School was established in 1927, for the Tuscaloosa County School System. The first building was built in the town of Abernant, Alabama.

=== Present building ===
The present building began construction in 2012 for a total capacity of 1,600 students. The former building was built to accommodate only 500 students, and enrollment had reached almost 1,000. This new state-of-the-art building was constructed to accommodate the area's influx of new residents as a result of the continued growth of the local auto manufacturing industry - Mercedes-Benz US International and its suppliers in nearby Vance, AL. Walter Energy (now Warrior Met Coal, Inc.) donated 93 acres directly adjoining the rear of the old school building, upon which the new 6A, 168,000 sq. ft. building was built.

== Curriculum and extracurricular activities ==
=== Curriculum ===
Brookwood High School offers standard classes (Standard Diploma), advanced classes (Advanced Diploma), Advanced Placement classes, and High Honors classes. The school uses the "Block System."

According to U.S. News & World Report, during the 2022-3 school year, Brookwood High School ranked fourth among six Tuscaloosa County School System high schools, with proficiency scores in math, reading, and science all below 40%. Only 5% of graduating students as a whole score a three or higher on at least one AP® exam: only 24% of the students take at least one AP® exam. In 2022, the school was ranked in the 46.6 percentile on its student performance exams, which is well below expectations. Neighboring Hillcrest High School, by comparison, was ranked in the 72.9 percentile. 20% of Hillcrest's graduating students as a whole scored a three or higher on at least one AP® exam and among those who took an AP® exam, 60% scored a three or higher on at least one. Brookwood's college readiness index is a 9.6/100. Northside, another high school in the TCSS system with half the student population of Brookwood, scored a 25/100 on the same index.

Brookwood's academic performance continues to decline. In the 2023-4 U.S. News & World Report ratings, BHS has fallen to fifth among TCSS high schools and seventh among nine high schools in Tuscaloosa County. Its college readiness index fell to 8.1/100. The percentage of graduating students scoring a three or higher on at least one AP® exam increased from 5 to 6% but the percentage of students taking at least one AP® exam dropped from 24 to 15%. Proficiency scores in math, reading, and science have dropped below 30% as well.

=== Sports ===
Brookwood High School offers several extracurricular sports activities for students. In 2015, the BHS boys' basketball team lost to Bibb County High School by a score of 2–0, the lowest-scoring high school basketball game in recorded history. In ninety-two seasons of football play, the BHS Panthers have only won their region three times. The Panthers are 0-5 in football playoff games. The team's overall winning percentage is 36%. The boys' wrestling team, however, won a state title in 2000. The most consistently successful sports teams at BHS are the boys' baseball team and the girls' softball team. Boys baseball has won six area championships and made three elite eight appearances in fifty-four years of play. The softball team has won six area championships and made two elite eight appearances in thirty-four years of play.

Sports teams

- Cheerleading
- Football (V & JV)
- Baseball (V & JV)
- Basketball, Girls (V)
- Basketball, Boys (V & JV)
- Golf, Boys
- Softball (V & JV)
- Volleyball (V & JV)
- Wrestling
- Track
- Powder Puff Girls (Seniors, female v. Juniors, female)
- Fishing Team

== Feeder schools ==
=== Middle schools ===
- Brookwood Middle School (Brookwood, Alabama) (grades 6-8)

=== Elementary schools ===
- Brookwood Elementary School (Brookwood, Alabama) (grades K-5)
- Vance Elementary School (Vance, Alabama) (grades K-5)
- Lake View Elementary School (Lake View, Alabama) (grades K-5)

== Notable incidents ==
Brookwood High School has experienced several illicit student-teacher relationships.

=== Katherine Nelson ===
Katherine Nelson is a 2004 graduate of Brookwood High School who returned there to teach English and coach cheerleading and golf after graduating from The University of Alabama in 2009. On February 24, 2016, the Tuscaloosa County Sheriff's office began investigating Nelson after the TCSS forwarded an email from an unidentified third party claiming to have caught Nelson in the act with a student who graduated in 2013. By February 29, Nelson had been arrested, charged with having an inappropriate relationship with a male student under the age of 19 during the spring of 2013. Court documents posted subsequently stated that Nelson admitted to the affair when interviewed by sheriff's deputies. Charges against Nelson were dropped on September 25, 2017 and the case dismissed. The Tuscaloosa District Attorney's office stated that the alleged victim declined to testify in the case.

=== Brad Petrey ===
In July 2015, then TCSS Superintendent Elizabeth Swinford announced that a Brookwood High School employee was banned from the school while administrators investigated an alleged "inappropriate" relationship with a student. Swinford noted that she had received "various email and text messages containing a link to a photo album" containing explicit photographs documenting the relationship between Joseph Bradley "Brad" Petrey, a social studies teacher and assistant football coach, and an unnamed student (subsequently identified in a lawsuit as Abigail Weissenbach) and that the matter had been referred to the Tuscaloosa County Sheriff's Office. Petrey was arrested on August 4, 2015, and booked in the Tuscaloosa County Jail on one charge of "school employee engaging in a sex act or deviant sexual intercourse with a student under the age of 19 years." TCSO investigator Sgt. Kenny Shipman said that the investigation "centered on compromising photographs that were leaked anonymously over the internet portraying the two in a sexual relationship while she was still a student and he a teacher." In fact, the photographs, including several of a humorous nature, have spawned at least one notable internet meme and were mainstays of the 4chan culture for some time. Charges against Petrey were dropped on February 6, 2017, after prosecutors stated that Weissenbach had left Alabama and refused to cooperate as a witness.

Later that year, Weissenbach filed a Title IX lawsuit against the TCSS in federal court, alleging that school officials were aware of Petrey's actions and did nothing to protect her from him. In an interview related to the case, Weissenbach claimed that the relationship with Petrey began during her junior year, when she "was going through a hard time and it was really nice to feel like I had someone who was in my corner that really, really cared.” She said that he was a friend and mentor, at first. “He kind of coached me in Christianity and talked to me a lot about that and would ask me to sit behind his desk and it really just grew from there really quickly and it turned into something before I really knew it was going down that path,” she said. In court filings, her lawyers stated that Weissenbach had confessed to Alyce Armstrong, her dance teacher at the McCalla Dance Academy, that she was in a relationship with "Brad," whom Armstrong soon discovered was her teacher. Armstrong reported her concerns to the Brookwood High administration, who reported to be appalled and assured her that they would investigate the matter. Yet, the following year, Petrey remained on staff and continued the relationship with Weissenbach. US Federal Court Judge L. Scott Coogler, however, dismissed most of the defendants in the case on November 8, 2018.
