= Coleanor, Alabama =

Unincorporated community in Alabama, United States

- Unincorporated community
- Location within the state of Alabama Coleanor, Alabama (the United States)
- Coordinates: 33°05′44″N 87°02′09″W
- Country: United States
- State: Alabama
- County: Bibb
- Elevation: 489 ft (149 m)
- Time zone: UTC-6 (Central (CST))
  - Summer (DST): UTC-5 (CDT)
- Area codes: 205, 659
- GNIS feature ID: 156200

Coleanor, also known as Coal-Eleanor, is an unincorporated community in Bibb County, Alabama, United States.

== History ==
The mine at Coleanor was originally known as the Upper Thompson Mine. The Blocton-Cahaba Coal Company operated a coal mine at Coleanor. Combined with nearby Piper, the two towns had a combined population of nearly 2,500. Coleanor was connected by rail to Piper and was located on the Southern Railway. The Coleanor Mine was closed after World War II.

In February 1934, members of the United Mine Workers called a strike at the Coleanor mine. Alabama National Guard troops were called in to Coleanor on February 25 to restore order.

Twelve different miners died working in the mines of Coleanor.

A post office operated under the name Coleanor from 1901 to 1942.
