= Piper, Alabama =

Unincorporated community in Alabama, United States

- Unincorporated community
- Location within the state of Alabama Piper, Alabama (the United States)
- Coordinates: 33°05′22″N 87°02′29″W
- Country: United States
- State: Alabama
- County: Bibb
- Elevation: 509 ft (155 m)
- Time zone: UTC-6 (Central (CST))
  - Summer (DST): UTC-5 (CDT)
- Area codes: 205, 659
- GNIS feature ID: 156903

Piper is an unincorporated community in Bibb County, Alabama, United States.

== History ==
Piper was named for Oliver Hazzard Perry Piper, who founded the Little Cahaba Coal Company and was a business partner of Henry F. DeBardeleben. The Little Cahaba Coal Company operated two mines at Piper. Combined with nearby Coleanor, the two towns had a combined population of nearly 2,500. Coal was shipped from Piper to Birmingham on the Louisville and Nashville Railroad. The last mine in Piper was closed in the 1950s.

In February 1934, members of the United Mine Workers called a strike at the Piper mines. Governor Benjamin M. Miller called in the Alabama National Guard to maintain order.

Six miners were killed in a mining accident in Piper on May 31, 1925.

A post office operated under the name Piper from 1905 to 1955.

== Notable people ==
- Piper Davis, Negro league baseball player from 1942 to 1950 for the Birmingham Black Barons.
