= Bibb County School District (Alabama) =

School district in Bibb County, Alabama, U.S.

Address
- 721 Walnut Street Centreville, Alabama, 35042; United States
- Coordinates: 32.9459°N 87.1242°W

District information
- Type: Public
- Grades: PreK–12
- NCES District ID: 0100360

Students and staff
- Students: 3,117
- Teachers: 180.75
- Staff: 160.0
- Student–teacher ratio: 17.24

Other information
- Website: www.bibbed.org

Bibb County School District is a school district in Bibb County, Alabama, United States.

== Schools ==
High schools:

- Bibb County High School (Centreville)
- West Blocton High School (West Blocton)

Middle schools:

- Centreville Middle School (Centreville)
- West Blocton Middle School (West Blocton)

Elementary schools:

- Brent (Brent)
- Randolph (Randolph)
- West Blocton (West Blocton)
- Woodstock (Woodstock)

Other:

- Bibb County Career Academy (West Blocton)
