= Brookwood, Alabama =

- City
- City of Brookwood
- Seal

- Location of Brookwood in Tuscaloosa County, Alabama.
- Coordinates: 33°14′23″N 87°19′40″W
- Country: United States
- State: Alabama
- County: Tuscaloosa

Government
  - Type: Mayor-Council

Area
  - Total: 8.46 sq mi (21.91 km^{2})
  - Land: 8.37 sq mi (21.68 km^{2})
  - Water: 0.089 sq mi (0.23 km^{2})
- Elevation: 515 ft (157 m)

Population (2020)
  - Total: 2,504
  - Density: 299/sq mi (115.5/km^{2})
- Time zone: UTC-6 (Central (CST))
  - Summer (DST): UTC-5 (CDT)
- ZIP code: 35444
- Area codes: 205, 659
- FIPS code: 01-09808
- GNIS feature ID: 2405333
- Website: City of Brookwood

Brookwood is a city in Tuscaloosa County, Alabama, United States. It incorporated in September 1977. As of the 2020 census, the population of the town is 2,504.

== History ==
=== 2001 mine disaster ===
On September 23, 2001, two separate explosions occurred at approximately 5:20 p.m. and 6:15 p.m. in 4 Section of the Jim Walter Resources Blue Creek No. 5 mine, resulting in fatal injuries to thirteen miners. At the time of the explosions, thirty-two miners were underground during a non-producing Sunday afternoon shift. Ten of those killed refused to evacuate, instead staying behind in an attempt to rescue several who were trapped after the first explosion.

== Demographics ==
Historical population
Census	Pop.	Note	%±
1970	196		—
1980	492		151.0%
1990	658		33.7%
2000	1,483		125.4%
2010	1,828		23.3%
2020	2,504		37.0%
U.S. Decennial Census; 2013 Estimate

At the 2000 census there were 1,483 people, 553 households, and 430 families living in the town. The population density was 182.3 inhabitants per square mile (70.4/km^{2}). There were 613 housing units at an average density of 75.4 per square mile (29.1/km^{2}). The racial makeup of the town was 97.91% White, 0.54% Black or African American, 0.07% Native American, 0.13% Asian, 0.20% from other races, and 1.15% from two or more races. 0.34% of the population were Hispanic or Latino of any race. Of the 553 households 42.1% had children under the age of 18 living with them, 63.3% were married couples living together, 9.4% had a female householder with no husband present, and 22.2% were non-families. 19.2% of households were one person and 6.7% were one person aged 65 or older. The average household size was 2.68 and the average family size was 3.07.

The age distribution was 28.9% under the age of 18, 8.7% from 18 to 24, 33.1% from 25 to 44, 21.8% from 45 to 64, and 7.5% 65 or older. The median age was 34 years. For every 100 females, there were 99.1 males. For every 100 females age 18 and over, there were 96.5 males.

The median household income was $40,104 and the median family income was $46,071. Males had a median income of $38,929 versus $23,571 for females. The per capita income for the town was $18,670. About 6.2% of families and 8.2% of the population were below the poverty line, including 10.1% of those under age 18 and 5.4% of those age 65 or over.

=== 2010 census ===
At the 2010 census there were 1,828 people, 659 households, and 516 families living in the town. The population density was 225.7 inhabitants per square mile (87.1/km^{2}). There were 703 housing units at an average density of 86.8 per square mile (33.5/km^{2}). The racial makeup of the town was 92.2% White, 5.3% Black or African American, 0.7% Native American, 0.1% Asian, 0.4% from other races, and 1.4% from two or more races. 2.0% of the population were Hispanic or Latino of any race. Of the 659 households 38.1% had children under the age of 18 living with them, 59.6% were married couples living together, 12.9% had a female householder with no husband present, and 21.7% were non-families. 17.8% of households were one person and 5.2% were one person aged 65 or older. The average household size was 2.77 and the average family size was 3.11.

The age distribution was 27.3% under the age of 18, 9.9% from 18 to 24, 33.1% from 25 to 44, 22.6% from 45 to 64, and 7.1% 65 or older. The median age was 32 years. For every 100 females there were 93.2 males. For every 100 females age 18 and over, there were 93.1 males.

The median household income was $55,357 and the median family income was $66,944. Males had a median income of $44,837 versus $31,118 for females. The per capita income for the town was $19,352. About 7.2% of families and 10.6% of the population were below the poverty line, including 12.1% of those under age 18 and 5.2% of those age 65 or over.

== Education ==
Brookwood is part of the Tuscaloosa County School System and has one elementary school, one middle school, and one high school.

== Infrastructure ==
=== Transportation ===
Brookwood is served by Alabama State Route 216, which runs northeast-west, and County Road 59, which runs north–south.

== Climate ==
The climate in this area is characterized by hot, humid summers and generally mild to cool winters. According to the Köppen Climate Classification system, Brookwood has a humid subtropical climate, abbreviated "Cfa" on climate maps.

Climate data for Brookwood, Alabama
Month	Jan	Feb	Mar	Apr	May	Jun	Jul	Aug	Sep	Oct	Nov	Dec	Year
Mean daily maximum °C (°F)	11 (52)	14 (57)	19 (66)	24 (75)	28 (82)	32 (89)	33 (91)	33 (91)	30 (86)	24 (76)	19 (66)	13 (56)	23 (74)
Mean daily minimum °C (°F)	−1 (30)	1 (33)	4 (40)	9 (48)	13 (56)	18 (64)	20 (68)	19 (67)	17 (62)	9 (49)	5 (41)	1 (34)	9 (49)
Average precipitation mm (inches)	140 (5.7)	130 (5.2)	150 (6)	120 (4.7)	110 (4.4)	120 (4.7)	140 (5.5)	99 (3.9)	100 (4)	81 (3.2)	120 (4.7)	120 (4.9)	1,440 (56.8)
Source: Weatherbase
