= Sand Mountain, Alabama =

Unincorporated community in Alabama, United States

- Unincorporated community
- Location within Alabama Location within the United States
- Coordinates: 32°51′17″N 86°54′45″W
- Country: United States
- State: Alabama
- County: Bibb
- Elevation: 512 ft (156 m)
- Time zone: UTC-6 (Central (CST))
  - Summer (DST): UTC-5 (CDT)
- Area codes: 205, 659
- GNIS feature ID: 160558

Sand Mountain is an unincorporated community in Bibb County, Alabama, United States. Sand Mountain was the home of John Timothy Morgan Weeks, a notable central Alabama photographer.
