= Ben Jones (offensive lineman) =

American football player (born 1989)

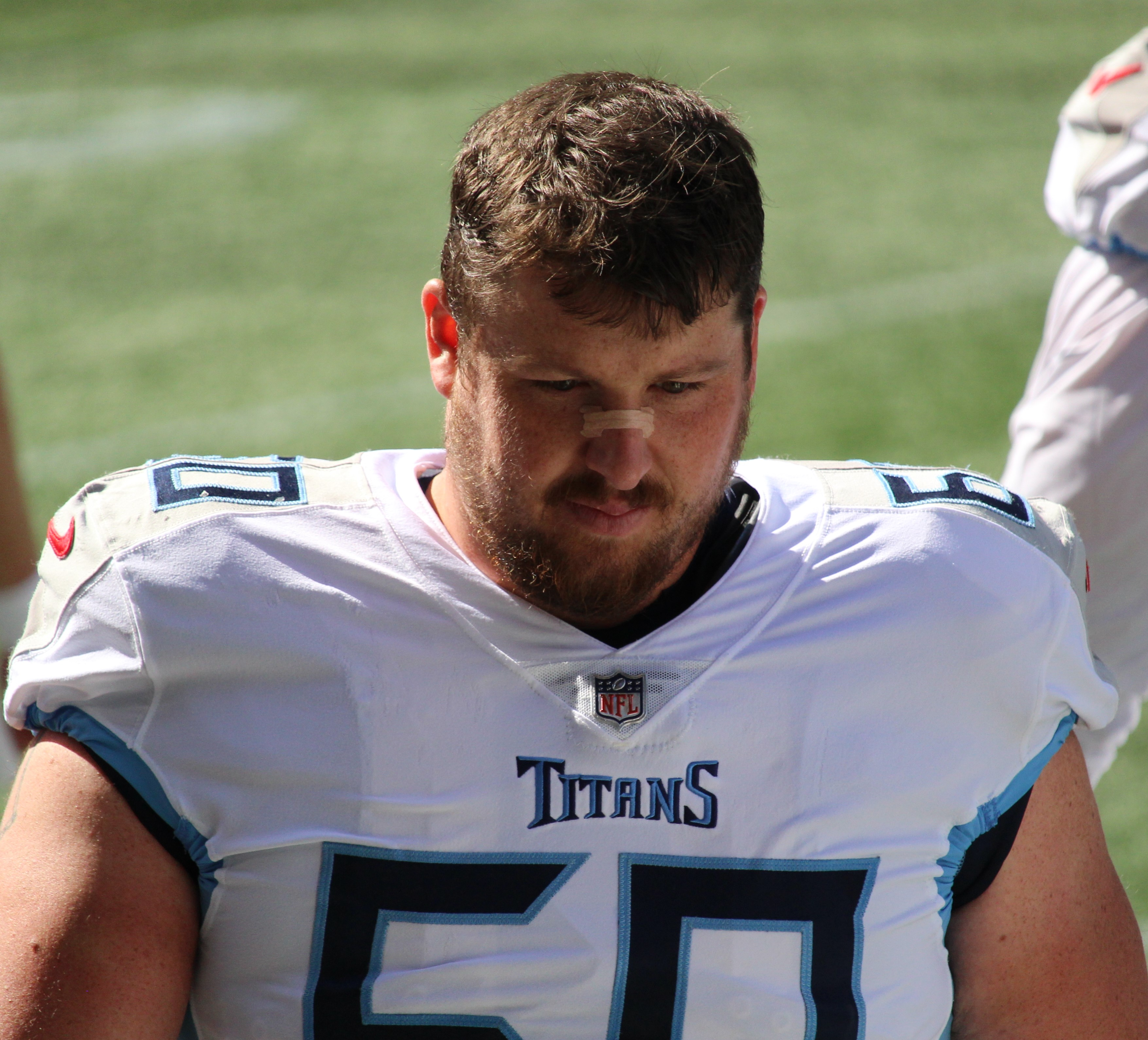
- Jones with the Tennessee Titans in 2021

No. 60
- Position: Center

Personal information
- Born: July 2, 1989 (age 37); Birmingham, Alabama, U.S.
- Listed height: 6 ft 3 in (1.91 m)
- Listed weight: 308 lb (140 kg)

Career information
- High school: Bibb County (Centreville, Alabama)
- College: Georgia (2008–2011)
- NFL draft: 2012: 4th round, 99th overall pick

Career history
- Houston Texans (2012–2015); Tennessee Titans (2016–2022)

Awards and highlights
- Pro Bowl (2022); First-team All-American (2011); 2× Second-team All-SEC (2009, 2011)

Career NFL statistics
- Games played: 172
- Games started: 151
- Fumble recoveries: 3
- Stats at Pro Football Reference

Benjamin Jones (born July 2, 1989) is an American former professional football center. He played college football for the Georgia Bulldogs. He was selected by the Houston Texans in the fourth round of the 2012 NFL draft.

== Early life ==
A native of Centreville, Alabama, Jones attended Bibb County High School, where he was a two-way lineman and team captain. He paved the way for running back Zac Stacy, who rushed for 1,666 yards and 24 touchdowns. Regarded as a three-star recruit by Rivals.com, Jones was listed as the No. 7 center prospect in his class. Despite living only an hour away from Tuscaloosa, Alabama, Jones grew up a Georgia Bulldog fan.

== College career ==
Jones became the Bulldog starting center three games into his freshman season (at No. 24 Arizona State), after Chris Davis was moved to left guard. The centerpiece of a young offensive line, Jones helped protect quarterback Matthew Stafford, who threw for 3,459 yards (second most in school history) and 25 touchdowns (single-season record), while also clearing the way for running back Knowshon Moreno (1,400 rushing yards).

As a senior in 2011, Jones was named an All-American by ESPN.

== Professional career ==
=== Pre-draft ===
Pre-draft measurables
Height	Weight	Arm length	Hand span	40-yard dash	10-yard split	20-yard split	20-yard shuttle	Three-cone drill	Vertical jump	Broad jump	Bench press
6 ft 2 5/8 in (1.90 m)	303 lb (137 kg)	32 1/2 in (0.83 m)	9 5/8 in (0.24 m)	5.44 s	1.86 s	3.12 s	4.74 s	7.95 s	30.5 in (0.77 m)	8 ft 9 in (2.67 m)	29 reps
All values from NFL Combine

Jones was considered one of the top center prospects for the 2012 NFL draft. Sports Illustrated ranked him second among center prospects, behind only Peter Konz.

=== Houston Texans ===
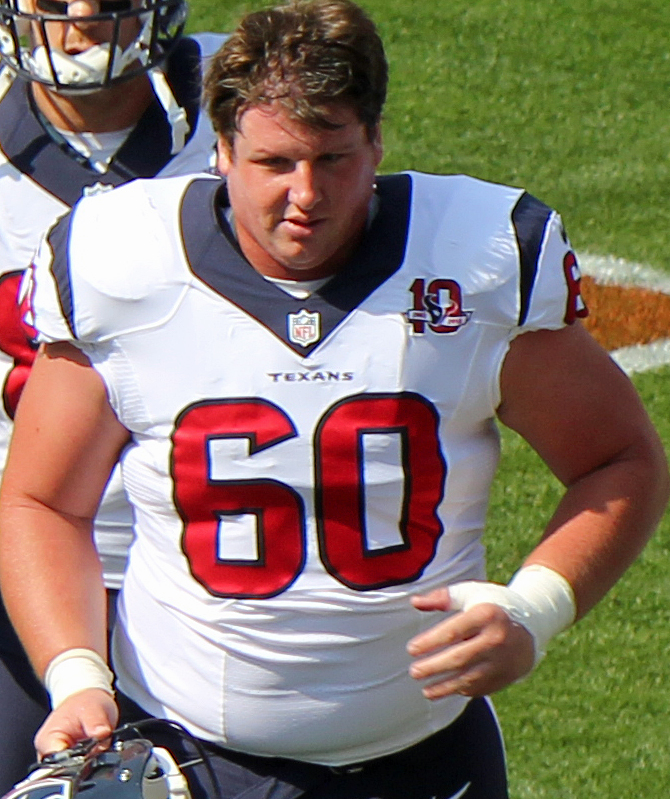
Jones with the Houston Texans in 2012

Jones was drafted in the fourth round by the Houston Texans with the 99th overall pick. He was one of only three centers selected, the other two being Konz and David Molk. Jones was expected to back up Pro Bowl center Chris Myers while also seeing time at guard. Starting in Week 7 of the 2012 NFL season against the Baltimore Ravens, Jones became the starting right guard for the Texans.

=== Tennessee Titans ===
On March 10, 2016, Jones signed a four-year contract with the Tennessee Titans. In 2016, he started all 16 games for Titans as they finished with a 9-7 record, from a 3-13 record the previous season. He blocked for Demarco Murray as the latter led the AFC in rushing yards.

In 2017, Jones remained the starting center for the Titans, starting all 16 regular season games; the team finished with another 9-7 record and qualified for the playoffs. Jones started in the AFC Wild Card game against the Kansas City Chiefs, blocking for Derrick Henry as the latter ran for 157 yards in a 22-21 comeback win; the Titans were in a 22-3 deficit at halftime. He also started the Divisional Round game against the New England Patriots, which resulted in a 35-14 loss.

In 2018, Jones started all 16 regular season games for the Titans, who finished with a third consecutive 9-7 record. He blocked for Derrick Henry as he was named AFC Offensive Player of the Month in December, running for 585 yards in the final four games of the season, including running for a career-high 238 yards and four touchdowns in a 30-9 week 14 win over the Jacksonville Jaguars.

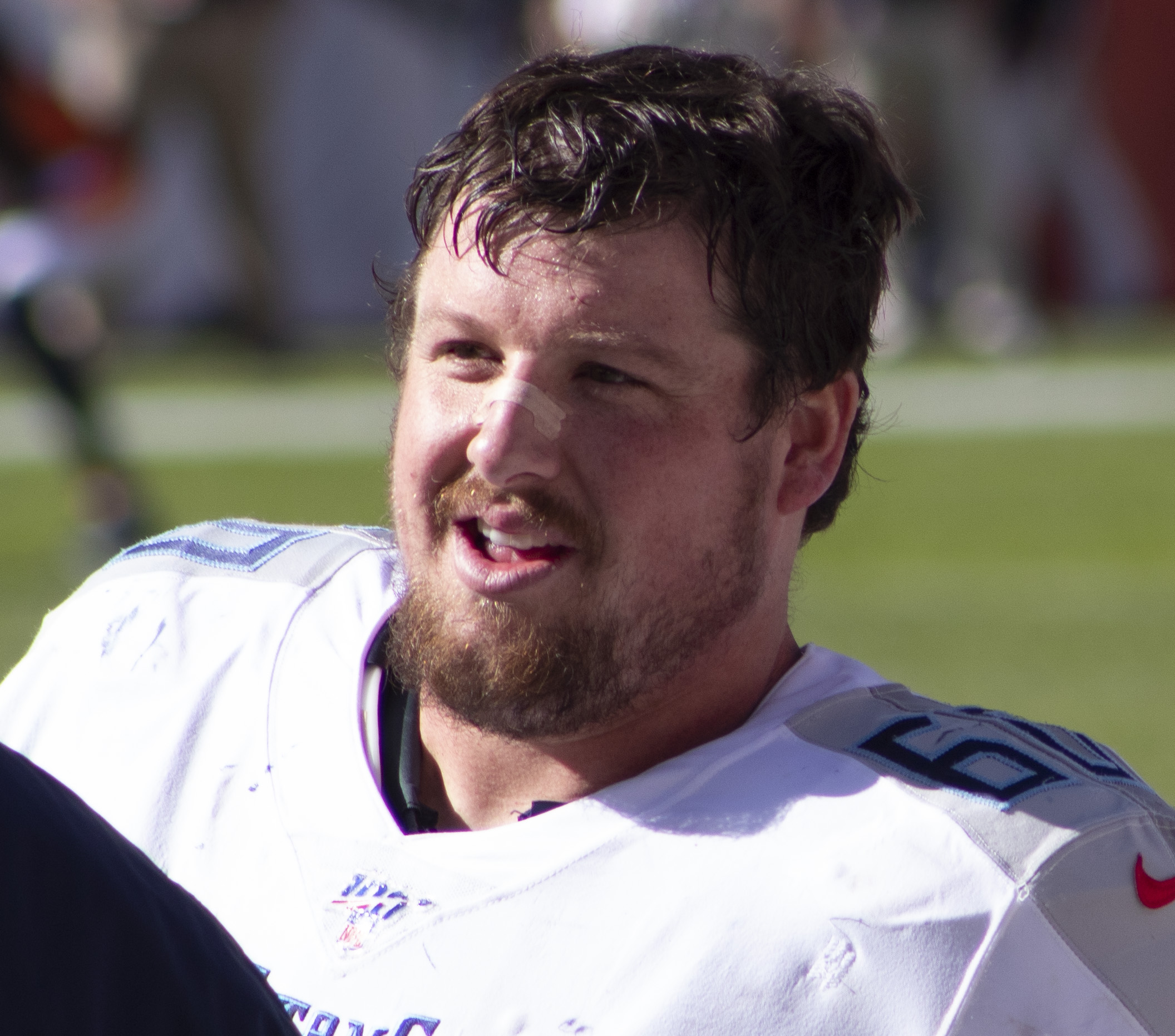
Jones with the Tennessee Titans in 2019

Jones signed a two-year, $13.5 million contract extension with the Titans on August 30, 2019. In 2019, Jones started 15 regular season games, missing the week 9 game against the Carolina Panthers with a concussion. The Titans finishing with a fourth consecutive 9-7 record, with Jones blocking for Derrick Henry as he won the NFL rushing yards title. The Titans qualified for the playoffs, making it to the AFC conference championships and losing to eventual Super Bowl Champions Kansas City Chiefs. Jones started all three playoff games, and blocked for Henry as he ran for nearly 200 yards in each of the first two games.

In 2020, Jones started all 16 games in the regular season and blocked for Henry as he won his second rushing yards title and was named Offensive Player of the Year by becoming the eighth player in NFL history to run for more than 2,000 yards in a season. The Titans won the AFC South with an 11-5 record. In the playoffs, Jones started for the Titans as they lost to the Baltimore Ravens in the wildcard round.

On March 15, 2022, Jones signed a two-year, $14 million contract extension with the Titans. He was placed on injured reserve on December 22, 2022. In January 2023, Jones was named as a replacement player for Creed Humphrey to the 2023 Pro Bowl, his first Pro Bowl.

On March 10, 2023, Jones was released by the Titans.
