= Brierfield Furnace =

United States state park and historic place

Brierfield Furnace Historical State Park
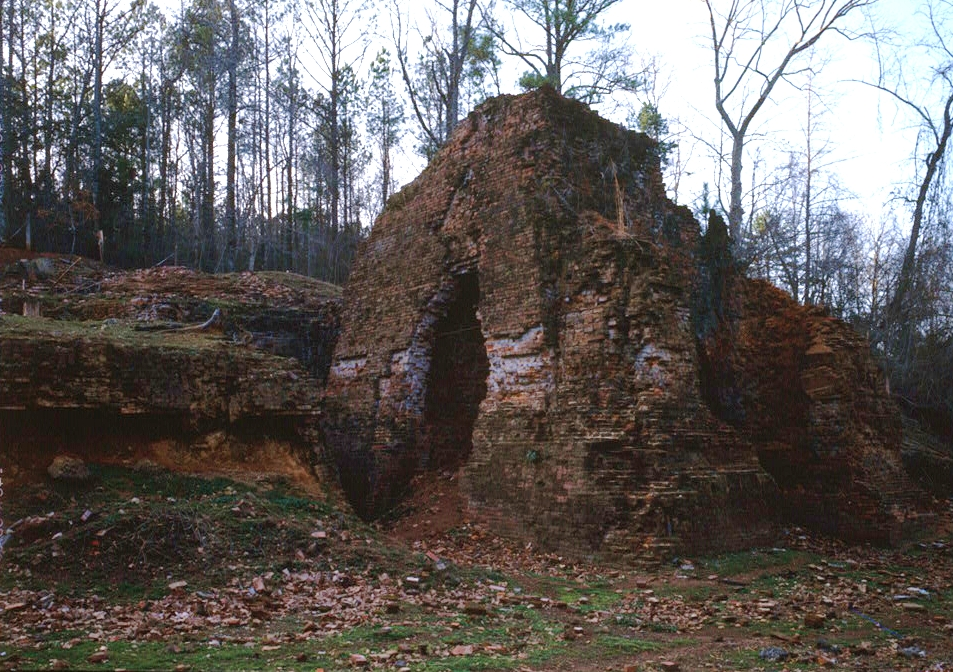
- Remnants of Brierfield Furnace

- Location within Alabama
- Location: Brierfield, Alabama, United States
- Coordinates: 33°2′22″N 86°56′56″W
- Area: 45 acres (18 ha)
- Established: 1976
- Administrator: Alabama Historic Ironworks Commission
- Designation: Alabama state park
- Website: Official website
- Brierfield Furnace
- U.S. National Register of Historic Places
- U.S. Historic district
- Location: Brierfield, Alabama
- Area: 486 acres (197 ha)
- Built: 1861
- Architect: Col. C. C. Huckabee, Jonathan Newton Smith
- NRHP reference No.: 74000401
- Added to NRHP: November 20, 1974

The Brierfield Furnace, also known as the Bibb Naval Furnace and Brierfield Ironworks, is a 486-acre (197 ha) historic district in Brierfield, Alabama, United States, that includes one building and nine sites. It was listed on the National Register of Historic Places on November 20, 1974. The Alabama Historic Ironworks Commission maintains 45 acres (18 ha) as Brierfield Ironworks Historical State Park.

== History ==
The Brierfield Furnace site was developed in 1861 by Caswell Campbell Huckabee, a Greensboro planter, and Jonathan Newton Smith, a Bibb County planter, on land purchased from Jesse Mahan near the Little Cahaba River, a tributary of the Cahaba. The endeavor was initially known as the Bibb County Iron Company, with Huckabee providing most of the capital and slave labor for construction. Richard Fell was employed to build a 36-foot-high (11 m) stone blast furnace and, in 1862, a rolling mill. The company produced cast iron initially, but soon changed over to the more lucrative production of wrought iron. The iron was used to produce farm implements.

Recognizing the high quality of iron produced at Brierfield, Confederate officials forced the men to sell the ironworks to the government for $600,000 in 1863, renaming it the Bibb Naval Furnace. A new 40-foot-high (12 m) brick furnace was built and a railroad line was constructed to connect the furnace to the mainline of the Alabama and Tennessee River Railroad. The output of the ironworks was then shipped to the Confederate arsenal at Selma. By 1864, the furnace was producing 25 tons of iron per day, much of which went into producing over 100 Brooke rifles ( a type of naval and coastal cannon), one of the South's most important weapons, at Selma. This all ended on March 31, 1865, when the Bibb Naval Furnace was destroyed by the 10th Missouri Volunteer Cavalry during Wilson's Raid.

Following the war, the operation was rebuilt under the private ownership of the Canebrake Company. The new company, formed by former Confederates Josiah Gorgas and Francis Strother Lyon, purchased the ironworks site from the Federal government for $45,000 in January 1866. They had the site back in production by November 2, 1866. In January 1867, Lyon turned the deed over to Gorgas, who became president of the newly formed Brierfield Ironworks. Gorgas leased the ironworks to Thomas S. Alvis on August 2, 1869. He ran the works until forced to close due to economic conditions following the Panic of 1873.

The facilities were purchased and reactivated by William D. and Kearsley Carter, of Louisville, Kentucky, in 1877. By 1882, the operation was under the management of Thomas Jefferson Peter of Kansas. Peter had the furnace rebuilt and remodeled the rolling mill. He also had a nailery, coke ovens, and a washer built. However, at least partially due to the competition from cut-wire nails out of Pittsburgh, the ironworks finally closed for good in December 1894.

In the years following the closure the site lay abandoned. During the World War II era thousands of bricks were scavenged from the site. In 1976, the Bibb County Commission created a park containing 45 acres (18 ha) at the urging of the Bibb County Historical Society. This initial effort has evolved over the years into what is now the Brierfield Ironworks Historical State Park.

== The modern park ==
The structures and sites that contribute to the National Register of Historic Places listing include the ruinous brick furnace (c. 1860s, 1880s), the tramway bed from the railroad (c. 1860s), the brick foundations of the rolling mill (c. 1862, 1880s), the nailery foundations (c. 1880s), coke ovens (c. 1880s), cemetery (c. 1850s), and the superintendent's house (c. 1870s).

Several other structures have been moved to the park from other nearby locations. They include the Ashby Post Office (c. 1900), Brierfield Ironworks Park Office (1894), Wilson Hayes House (c. 1900), J. Henry Jones General Store (c. 1900), Lightsey Cabin (1840), Sims-Hubbard Log Cabin (c. 1850), Billy Mitchell Cabin (1880s), and Mulberry Baptist Church (1897).

== Amenities ==
The park features an outdoor amphitheater, hiking, biking and nature trails, campsites, and a swimming pool.

== See also ==
- Birmingham District
- Shelby Ironworks
- Tannehill Ironworks
