= Lawley, Alabama =

Unincorporated community in Alabama, United States

- Unincorporated community
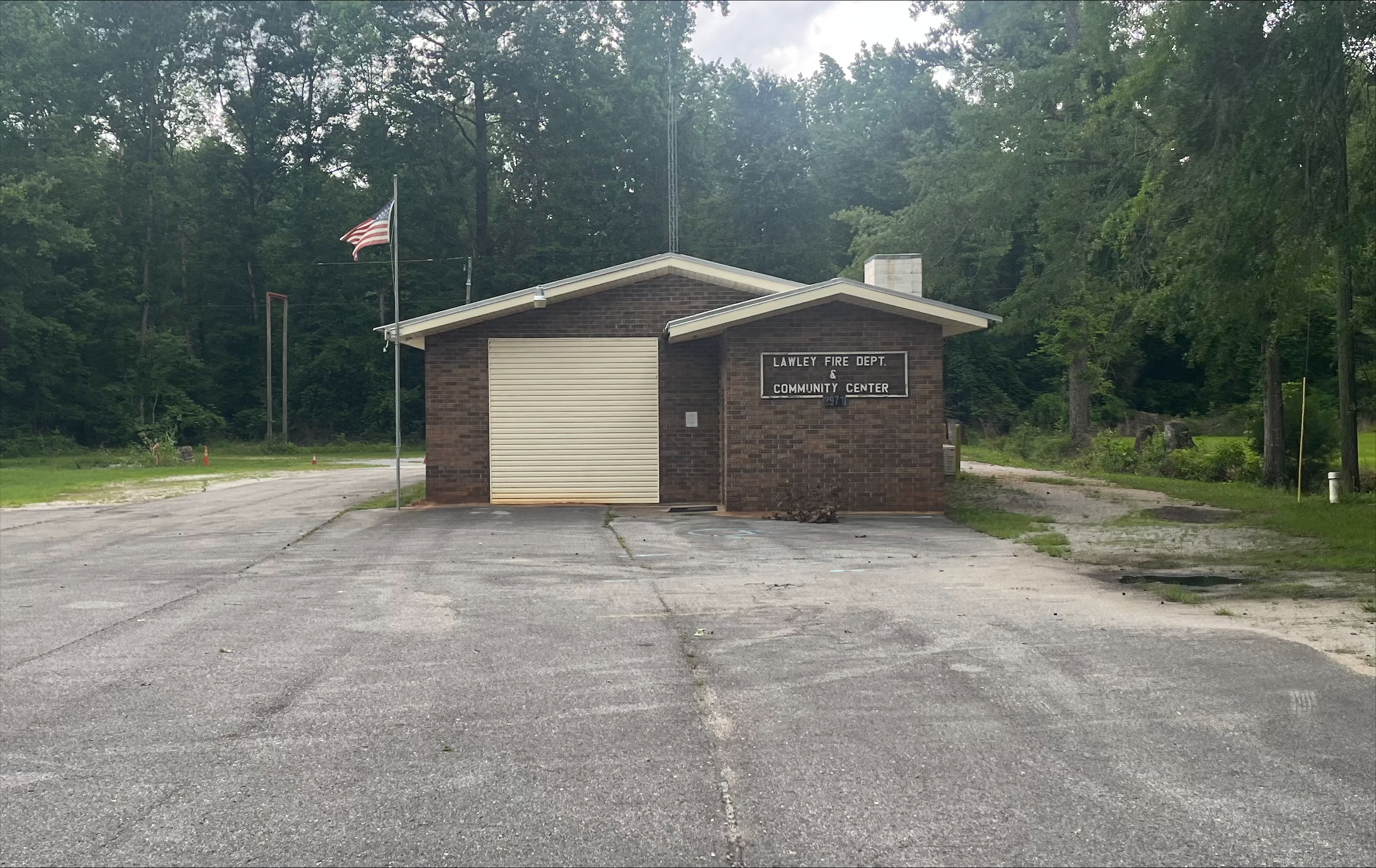
- Lawley Volunteer Fire Department and Community Center

- Location within the state of Alabama Lawley, Alabama (the United States)
- Coordinates: 32°51′34″N 86°57′4″W
- Country: United States
- State: Alabama
- County: Bibb
- Elevation: 423 ft (129 m)
- Time zone: UTC-6 (Central (CST))
  - Summer (DST): UTC-5 (CDT)
- ZIP code: 36793
- Area codes: 205, 659

Lawley is an unincorporated community in Bibb County, Alabama, United States.

== History ==
Lawley is likely named for the family of Joseph Lawley, who moved to the area from Randolph County, North Carolina.

The community had a post office, with postmasters appointed from 1955 to 2005.
