= Active, Alabama =

Unincorporated community in Alabama, United States

- Unincorporated community
- Location within the state of Alabama Active, Alabama (the United States)
- Coordinates: 32°52′04″N 86°58′37″W
- Country: United States
- State: Alabama
- County: Bibb
- Elevation: 440 ft (134 m)
- Time zone: UTC-6 (Central (CST))
  - Summer (DST): UTC-5 (CDT)
- Area codes: 205, 659

Active is an unincorporated community in Bibb County, Alabama, United States.

== History ==
The community was located on the Mobile and Ohio Railroad and was likely named to reflect the active spirit of its residents. A post office called Active was established in 1899, and remained in operation until it was discontinued in 1906.

== Demographics ==
According to the census returns from 1850-2010 for Alabama, it has never reported a population figure separately on the U.S. Census.
