= Antioch, Bibb County, Alabama =

Unincorporated community in Alabama, United States

Antioch, Alabama
- Unincorporated community
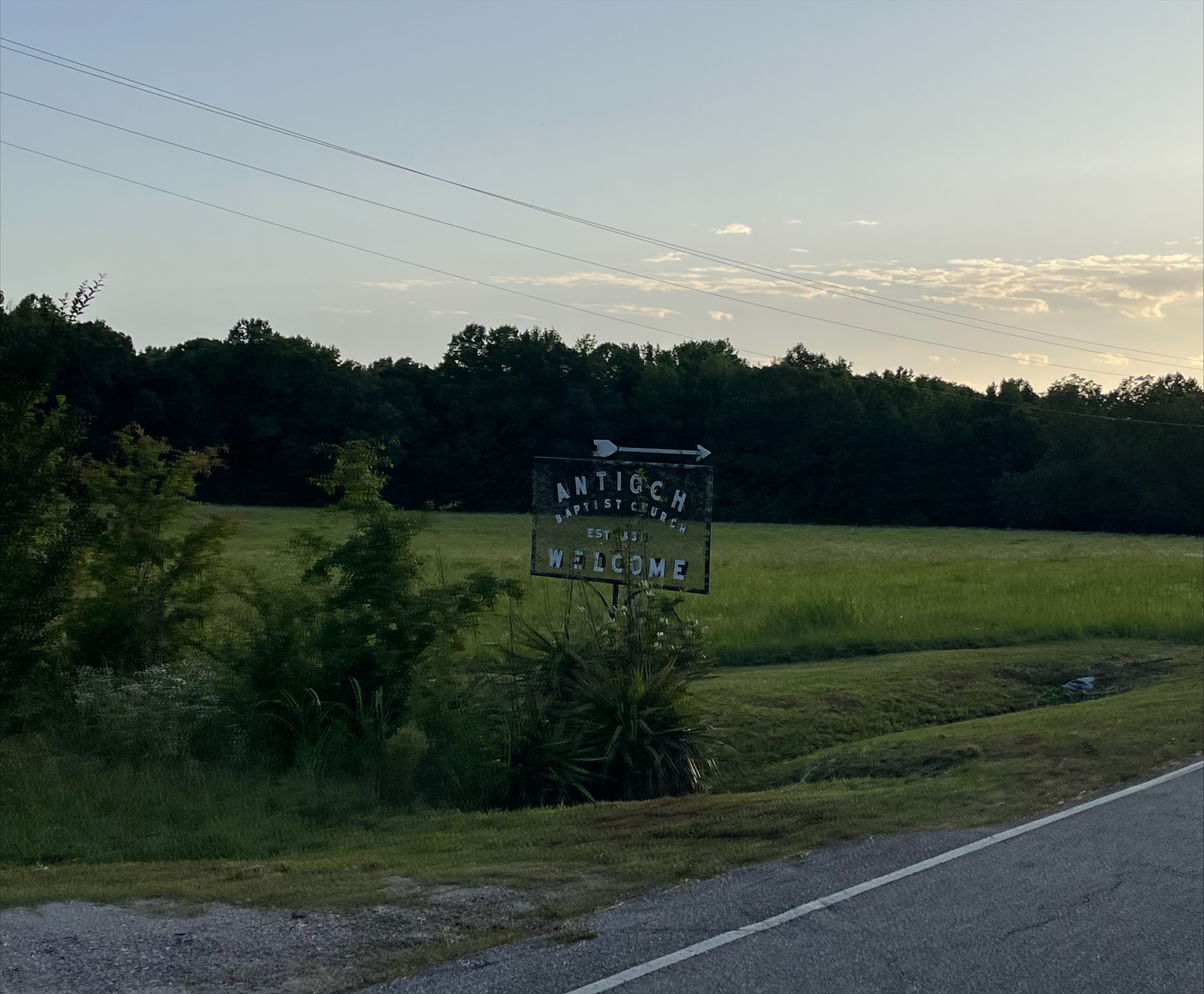
- Welcome sign for Antioch Baptist Church

- Location within Alabama Location within the United States
- Coordinates: 32°56′41″N 86°59′55″W
- Country: United States
- State: Alabama
- County: Bibb
- Elevation: 538 ft (164 m)
- Time zone: UTC-6 (Central (CST))
  - Summer (DST): UTC-5 (CDT)
- Area codes: 205, 659
- GNIS feature ID: 162935

Antioch is an unincorporated community in Bibb County, Alabama, United States, located west of Randolph along Bibb County Road 20.

== History ==
The community is home to several churches, including Antioch Baptist Church, the community's namesake, which formed in 1833. The church was once the largest church in Bibb County and was damaged by arsonists in 2006.

Though the community was not officially constituted until 1833, Antioch's notoriety comes from being the county seat of Bibb from 1818 until 1830.

Remnants of the Woolley School remain on County Road 20. Formerly a one-room schoolhouse with J.C. Hicks as Schoolmaster, the Woolley School is now an abandoned structure that has been vacant for at least 30 years.

Antioch appears on the Randolph U.S. Geological Survey Map.

== Demographics ==
According to the returns from 1850-2010 for Alabama, it has never reported a population figure separately on the U.S. Census.
