= Marvel, Alabama =

Unincorporated community in Alabama, United States

- Unincorporated community
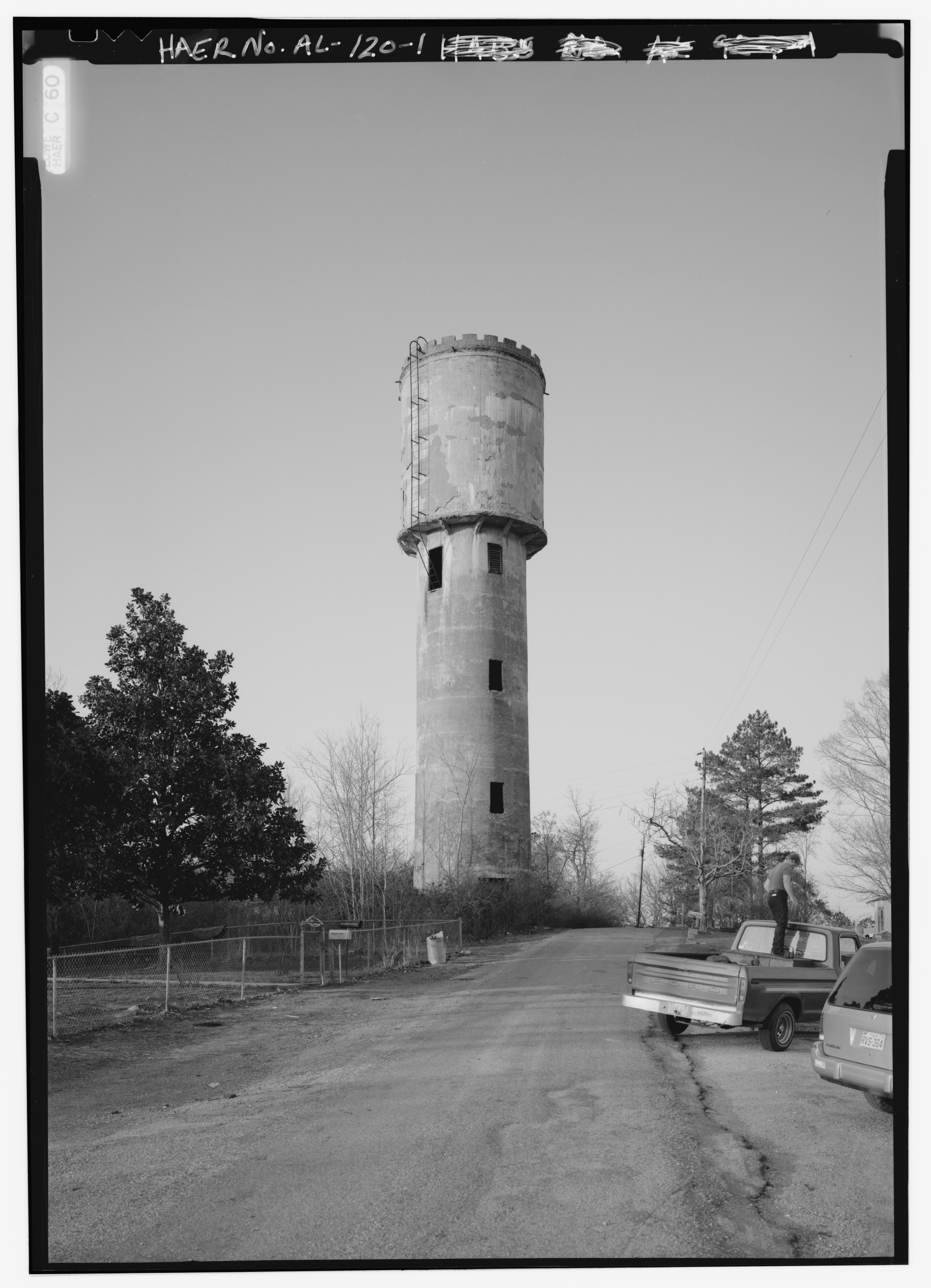
- The old Marvel Water Tower, photographed in 1993

- Location within the state of Alabama Marvel, Alabama (the United States)
- Coordinates: 33°08′48″N 87°00′11″W
- Country: United States
- State: Alabama
- County: Bibb
- Elevation: 522 ft (159 m)
- Time zone: UTC-6 (Central (CST))
  - Summer (DST): UTC-5 (CDT)
- Area codes: 205, 659
- GNIS feature ID: 122348

Marvel is an unincorporated community in Bibb County, Alabama, United States.

== History ==
The community was named for the poet Andrew Marvell by Elizabeth Roden, wife of the operator of the mines at Marvel. Marvel was founded by Benjamin F. Roden, who was the founder of the Roden Coal Company. Roden was an early business owner who was instrumental in the rapid growth of Birmingham. He operated a grocery company in Birmingham, established the first street car system in Birmingham, and founded the city of Avondale. The Roden Coal Company operated two mines in Marvel. The coal company also operated a company store in the community, which included a candy, drug, and tobacco department. An explosion at the mines in October 1916 killed 19 miners.

A post office operated under the name Marvel from 1907 to 1973.
