= Bibb County High School =

Public high school in Centreville, Alabama

Location
- 220 Birmingham Road; Centreville, Alabama 35042; United States; 32°56′51″N 87°08′33″W

Information
- Other name: BCHS
- Type: Public high school
- School district: Bibb County School District
- NCES School ID: 010036000092
- Principal: Charles Steiner
- Teaching staff: 27.00 (on an FTE basis)
- Grades: 9–12
- Enrollment: 453 (2023–2024)
- Student to teacher ratio: 16.78
- Colors: Purple and gold
- Mascot: Choctaw
- Website: bchs.bibbed.org

Bibb County High School (BCHS) is a public high school in Centreville, Alabama, United States. It is part of the Bibb County School District.

== History ==
The current Bibb County Junior High School, which has an original section and two additions, is a two-story brick building. It formerly served as the high school and is red in color. The building, the first consolidated comprehensive high school in Bibb County, was constructed in 1909. In the 1930s, a tornado destroyed the roof, and the additions were built in the first half of the same decade. The current building opened in 1962 with the junior high taking over the previous facility. In 1977, the old building was designated as an Alabama historical landmark.

== Athletics ==
In 2015, the BCHS boys' basketball team beat Brookwood High School by a score of 2–0, the lowest-scoring high school basketball game in recorded history.

== Notable alumni ==
- Ben Jones, NFL offensive lineman
- Zac Stacy, NFL running back
