= Little Hope, Alabama =

Unincorporated community in Alabama, United States

- Unincorporated community
- Location within Alabama Location within the United States
- Coordinates: 33°00′26″N 87°16′57″W
- Country: United States
- State: Alabama
- County: Bibb
- Elevation: 574 ft (175 m)
- Time zone: UTC-6 (Central (CST))
  - Summer (DST): UTC-5 (CDT)
- GNIS feature ID: 151011

Little Hope is an unincorporated community in Bibb County, Alabama, United States.

Little Hope Primitive Baptist Church and Cemetery, established in 1842, are located there.
