= Puritan Mines, West Virginia =

Puritan Mines
- Unincorporated community
- Location within the state of West Virginia Puritan Mines (the United States)
- Coordinates: 37°42′12″N 82°9′44″W
- Country: United States
- State: West Virginia
- County: Mingo
- Elevation: 804 ft (245 m)
- Time zone: UTC-5 (Eastern (EST))
  - Summer (DST): UTC-4 (EDT)
- GNIS ID: 1728838

Puritan Mines is an unincorporated community in Mingo County, West Virginia, United States. Their post office no longer exists.
