= Thacker, West Virginia =

- Unincorporated community
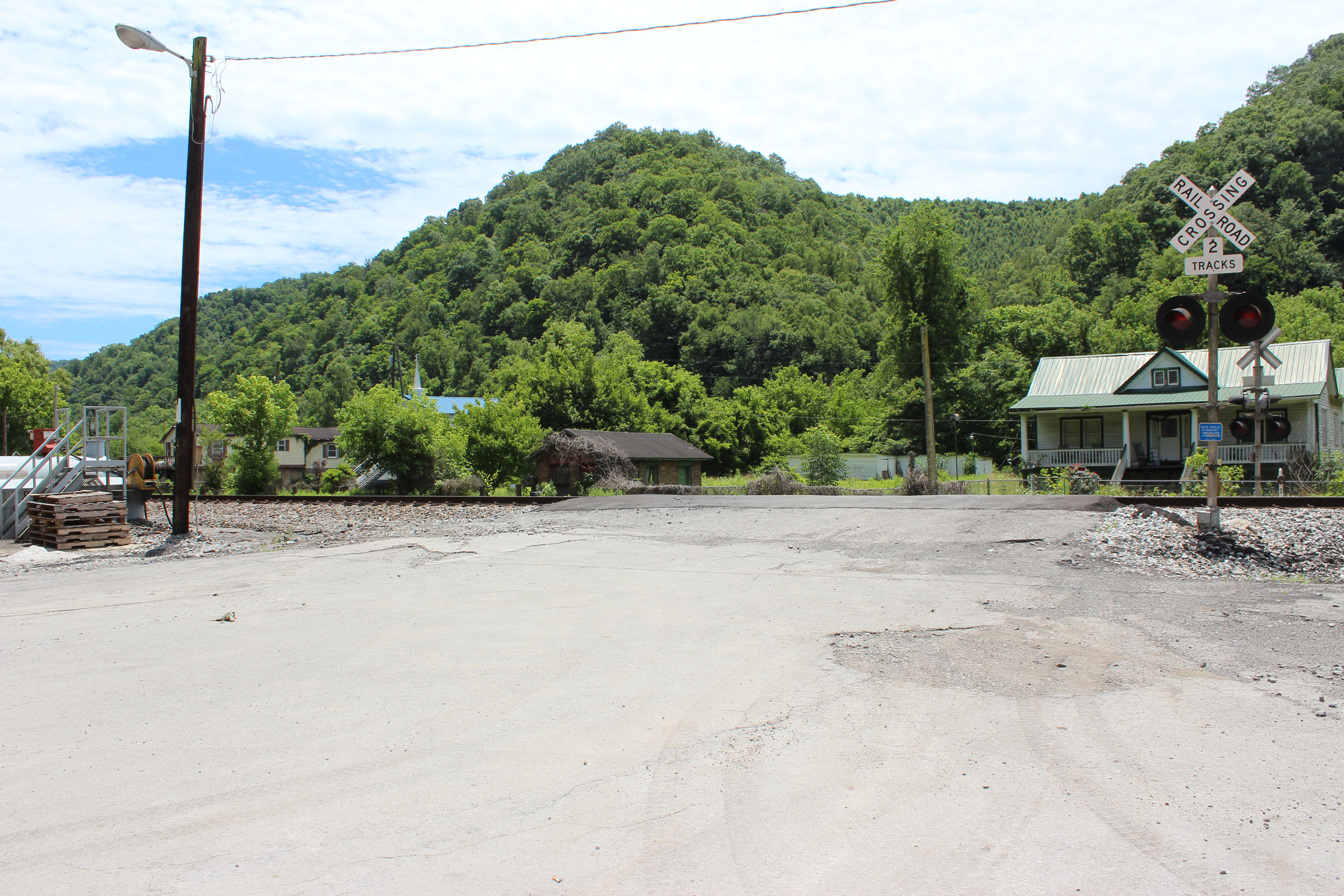
- Houses along the railroad in Thacker

- Location within West Virginia Location within the United States
- Coordinates: 37°35′40″N 82°07′53″W
- Country: United States
- State: West Virginia
- County: Mingo
- Elevation: 722 ft (220 m)
- Time zone: UTC-5 (Eastern (EST))
  - Summer (DST): UTC-4 (EDT)
- Area codes: 304 & 681
- GNIS feature ID: 1547991

Thacker is an unincorporated community in Mingo County, West Virginia, United States. Thacker is located along the Tug Fork across from the state of Kentucky.

The community takes its name from nearby Thacker Creek.
