= North Matewan, West Virginia =

- Unincorporated community
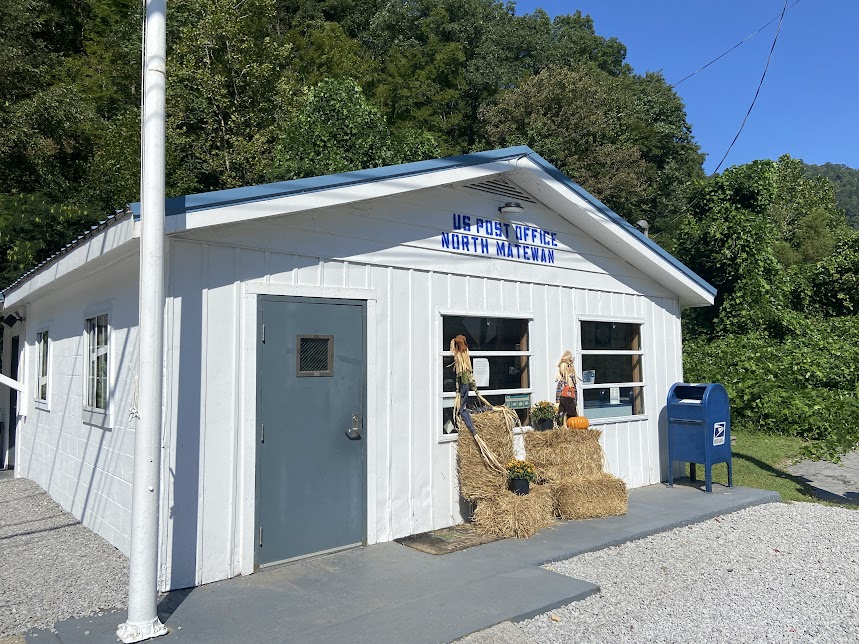
- North Matewan post office

- Location within West Virginia Location within the United States
- Coordinates: 37°37′35″N 82°08′53″W
- Country: United States
- State: West Virginia
- County: Mingo
- Elevation: 725 ft (221 m)
- Time zone: UTC-5 (Eastern (EST))
  - Summer (DST): UTC-4 (EDT)
- ZIP code: 25688
- Area codes: 304 & 681
- GNIS feature ID: 1544228

North Matewan is an unincorporated community in Mingo County, West Virginia, United States. North Matewan is located on West Virginia Route 65, 1 mile (1.6 km) east-northeast of Matewan. North Matewan has a post office with ZIP code 25688.
