= Brierfield, Alabama =

Unincorporated community in Alabama, United States

- Unincorporated community
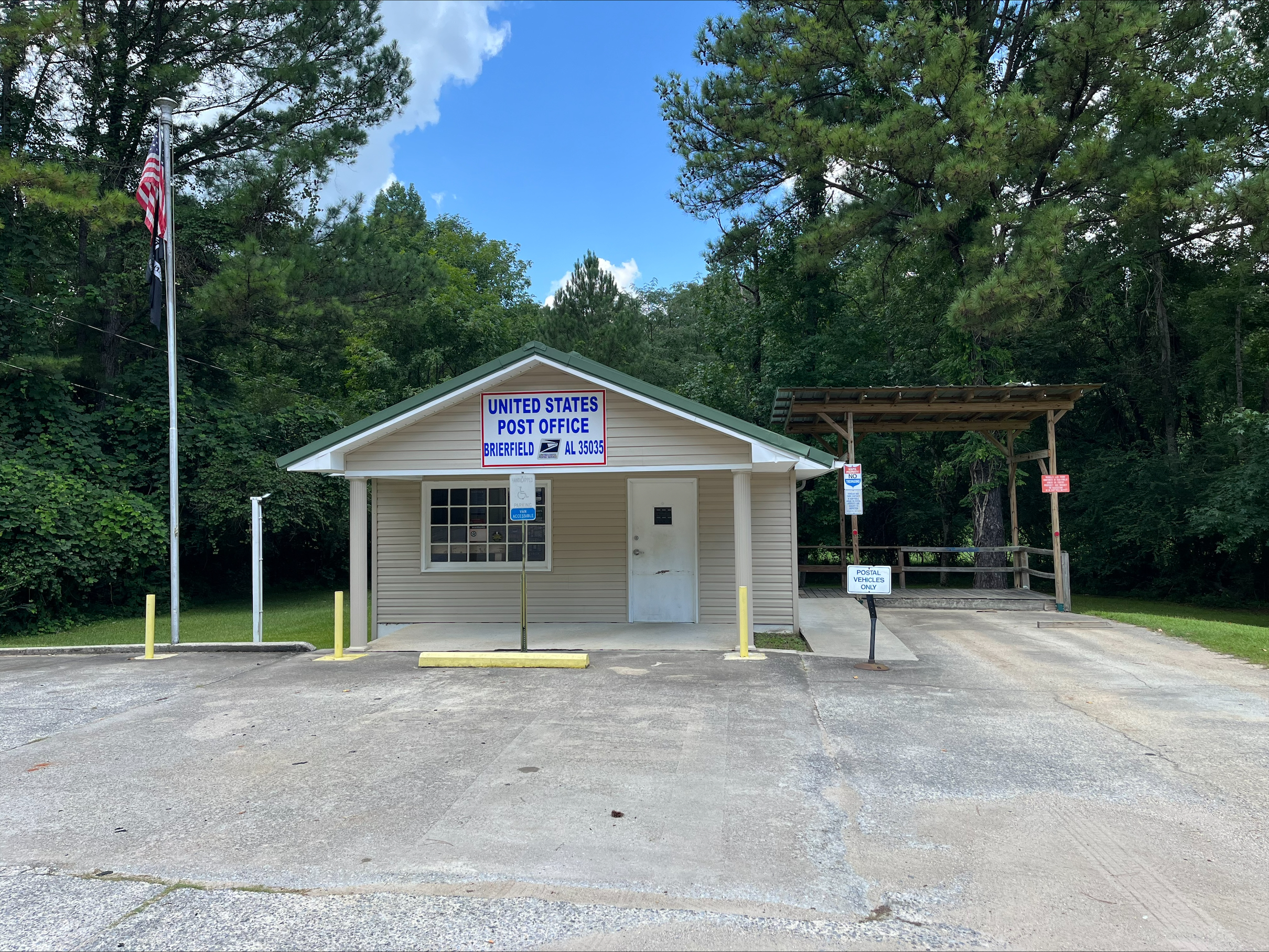
- Brierfield Post Office

- Location within the state of Alabama Brierfield, Alabama (the United States)
- Coordinates: 33°2′21″N 86°54′31″W
- Country: United States
- State: Alabama
- County: Bibb
- Elevation: 377 ft (115 m)
- Time zone: UTC-6 (Central (CST))
  - Summer (DST): UTC-5 (CDT)
- ZIP code: 35035
- Area codes: 205, 659

Brierfield is an unincorporated community in Bibb County, Alabama, United States. It was established in the mid 19th century and was the site of a major ironworks operation during and following the American Civil War. It is thought by scholars to be named in honor of Jefferson Davis' Brierfield Plantation, which supplied the first ironworks with machinery. It has two sites listed on the National Register of Historic Places, the Brierfield Furnace and Montebrier.
