= Tamcliff, West Virginia =

Tamcliff
- Unincorporated community
- Location within the state of West Virginia Tamcliff (the United States)
- Coordinates: 37°38′18″N 81°52′35″W
- Country: United States
- State: West Virginia
- County: Mingo
- Elevation: 807 ft (246 m)
- Time zone: UTC-5 (Eastern (EST))
  - Summer (DST): UTC-4 (EDT)
- GNIS ID: 1547883

Tamcliff is an unincorporated community in Mingo County, West Virginia, United States. Their Post Office no longer exists.
