= Blocton Italian Catholic Cemetery =

United States historic place in Bibb County, Alabama

- U.S. National Register of Historic Places
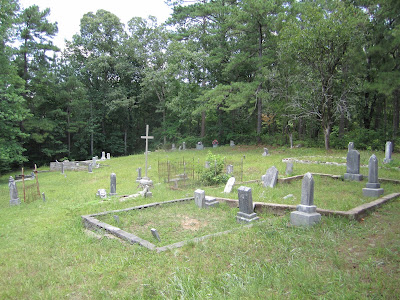
- Overview of the cemetery

- Location within Alabama Location within the United States
- Location: Primitive Ridge Rd., West Blocton, Alabama
- Coordinates: 33°6′46″N 87°6′49″W
- Area: less than one acre
- Built: 1896
- NRHP reference No.: 99000464
- Added to NRHP: April 22, 1999

The Blocton Italian Catholic Cemetery is a historic cemetery in West Blocton, Alabama, United States. It was established in 1896 by an Italian Catholic population, immigrants who worked in the coal mines that were once numerous in the county. The cemetery is located in what was originally Blocton, a coal mining company town owned by the Tennessee Coal, Iron and Railroad Company. It was consecrated in 1901 by Edward Patrick Allen, the Roman Catholic Bishop of Mobile. It continued in use until the 1960s, with the most active use occurring during the 1910s and 1920s. The cemetery contains approximately 86 funerary monuments. It was added to the National Register of Historic Places on April 22, 1999.
