= Greyeagle, West Virginia =

Greyeagle
- Unincorporated community
- Location within the state of West Virginia Greyeagle (the United States)
- Coordinates: 37°50′58″N 82°25′01″W
- Country: United States
- State: West Virginia
- County: Mingo
- Elevation: 623 ft (190 m)
- Time zone: UTC-5 (Eastern (EST))
  - Summer (DST): UTC-4 (EDT)
- GNIS ID: 1554616

Greyeagle is an unincorporated community in Mingo County, West Virginia, United States. Their post office no longer exists.

The community took its name from the local Grey Eagle Coal Company.
