= West Blocton High School =

Location
- 4734 Truman Aldrich Parkway; West Blocton, Alabama 35184; United States
- Coordinates: 33°06′47″N 87°07′43″W

Information
- Type: Public secondary school
- School district: Bibb County School District
- Superintendent: Terry McGee
- CEEB code: 012820
- Principal: Terry Lawley
- Teaching staff: 24.50 (on an FTE basis)
- Enrollment: 395 (2023-2024)
- Student to teacher ratio: 16.12
- Mascot: Tigers
- Website: wbhs.bibbed.org

West Blocton High School (WBHS) is a public secondary school in West Blocton, Alabama, and a part of the Bibb County School District.

Circa 2002 the homecoming games typically have turnouts of almost 400. Robert Dewitt in the Tuscaloosa News cited names of businesses that include the word "tiger", the school's mascot, when saying "Social life in town revolves mostly around church and school."

== Demographics ==
The demographic breakdown of the 387 students enrolled for 2021-22 was:

- Male - 53.7%
- Female - 46.3%
- Asian - 0.8%
- Black - 7.8%
- Hispanic - 4.7%
- White - 86.0%
- Multiracial - 0.8%

30.7% of the students were eligible for free or reduced-cost lunch. As of 2021–22, West Blocton is no longer a Title I school.

== Academic performance ==
In 2017 the school was "failing" according to Alabama state school accountability rules.
