= Blocton, West Virginia =

Unincorporated community in West Virginia, United States

Blocton
- Unincorporated community
- Location within the state of West Virginia
- Coordinates: 37°47′48″N 82°20′32″W
- Country: United States
- State: West Virginia
- County: Mingo
- Elevation: 636 ft (194 m)
- Time zone: UTC-5 (Eastern (EST))
  - Summer (DST): UTC-4 (EDT)
- FIPS code: 1553926

Blocton is an unincorporated community located in Mingo County, West Virginia, United States. Its deserted and the post office is closed.
