= Centreville Historic District (Centreville, Alabama) =

Historic district in Alabama, United States

- U.S. National Register of Historic Places
- U.S. Historic district
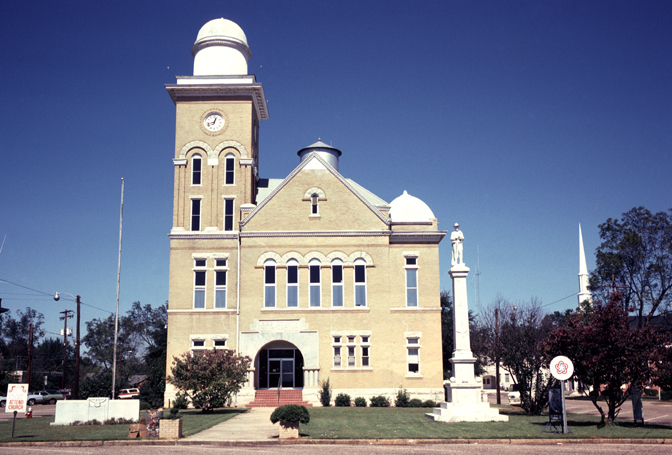
- Bibb County Courthouse in 1999

- Location within Alabama Location within the United States
- Location: Walnut St., East and West Court Sq., Centreville, Alabama
- Coordinates: 32°56′41″N 87°8′13″W
- Area: 7.5 acres (3.0 ha)
- Architectural style: Late 19th And 20th Century Revivals, Late Victorian
- NRHP reference No.: 78000482
- Added to NRHP: October 19, 1978

The Centreville Historic District is a historic district in Centreville, Alabama, United States. It includes 7.5 acres (3.0 ha) and twenty buildings, including the Bibb County Courthouse. It is roughly bounded by Walnut Street, and the East and West Court squares. It features examples of Victorian architecture. The district was added to the National Register of Historic Places on October 19, 1978.

== List of structures ==
The district is made up of 20 historic buildings, which are listed in no particular order.

- Davidson-Leeper House (419 Walnut Street); built c. 1869 or earlier.
- Ritz Theatre (427 Walnut Street); built c. 1920.
- Thrasher Building (429–443 Walnut Street); built c. 1925 as a multi-business storefront complex.
- Bibb County Banking and Trust Company (101–107 Court Square, West); built 1899.
- Bibb County Service Building (109 Court Square, West); built c. 1920.
- Centreville Presbyterian Church (115 Court Square, West); built 1859.
- Centreville Press Building and the Hellums and McElvey Law Office (117–119 Court Square, West); built c. 1928.
- Bibb County Jail (121 Court Square, West); built c. 1910.
- Bibb County Courthouse (Court Square); built 1902.
- Chism Cleaners (122 Court Square, East); built c. 1920.
- Masonic Building (Court Square, East); built c. 1910.
- Southland Furniture Store (110 Court Square, East); built 1926.
- Kennedy House (476 Walnut Street); built 1837.
- Yeager Building (466 Walnut Street); built c. 1898.
- Yeager Hotel (458 Walnut Street); built 1898.
- Quality Clothing Store (456 Walnut Street); built c. 1903.
- Meig’s Drug Store (488 Walnut Street); built 1895.
- Fuller Building (444 Walnut Street); built c. 1908.
- Fashion Fabrics (440 Walnut Street); built c. 1903.
- Pratt Building (436-438 Walnut Street); built c. 1903.
- Confederate Statue (Court Square); built 1910.
