= West Blocton, Alabama =

- Town
- Flag

- Location of West Blocton in Bibb County, Alabama
- Coordinates: 33°07′05″N 87°07′30″W
- Country: United States
- State: Alabama
- County: Bibb
- Founded: August 28, 1883
- Incorporated: 1901

Government
  - Mayor: Daniel Sims

Area
  - Total: 4.822 sq mi (12.489 km^{2})
  - Land: 4.798 sq mi (12.427 km^{2})
  - Water: 0.024 sq mi (0.063 km^{2})
- Elevation: 495 ft (151 m)

Population (2020)
  - Total: 1,217
  - Estimate (2023): 1,189
  - Density: 247.8/sq mi (95.68/km^{2})
- Time zone: UTC−6 (Central (CST))
  - Summer (DST): UTC−5 (CDT)
- ZIP Code: 35184
- Area codes: 205 and 659
- FIPS code: 01-80928
- GNIS feature ID: 0153935
- Sales tax: 10.0%

West Blocton is a town in Bibb County, Alabama, United States. The population was 1,217 at the 2020 census.

== History ==
It was built on land once owned by Uriah Smith, near the company town Blocton. Many of its non-native residents were immigrants from various European countries, with Italians being the largest, as they came to do mining in the area. West Blocton has a neighborhood previously named "Dago Hollow" and now called Little Italy.

== Geography ==
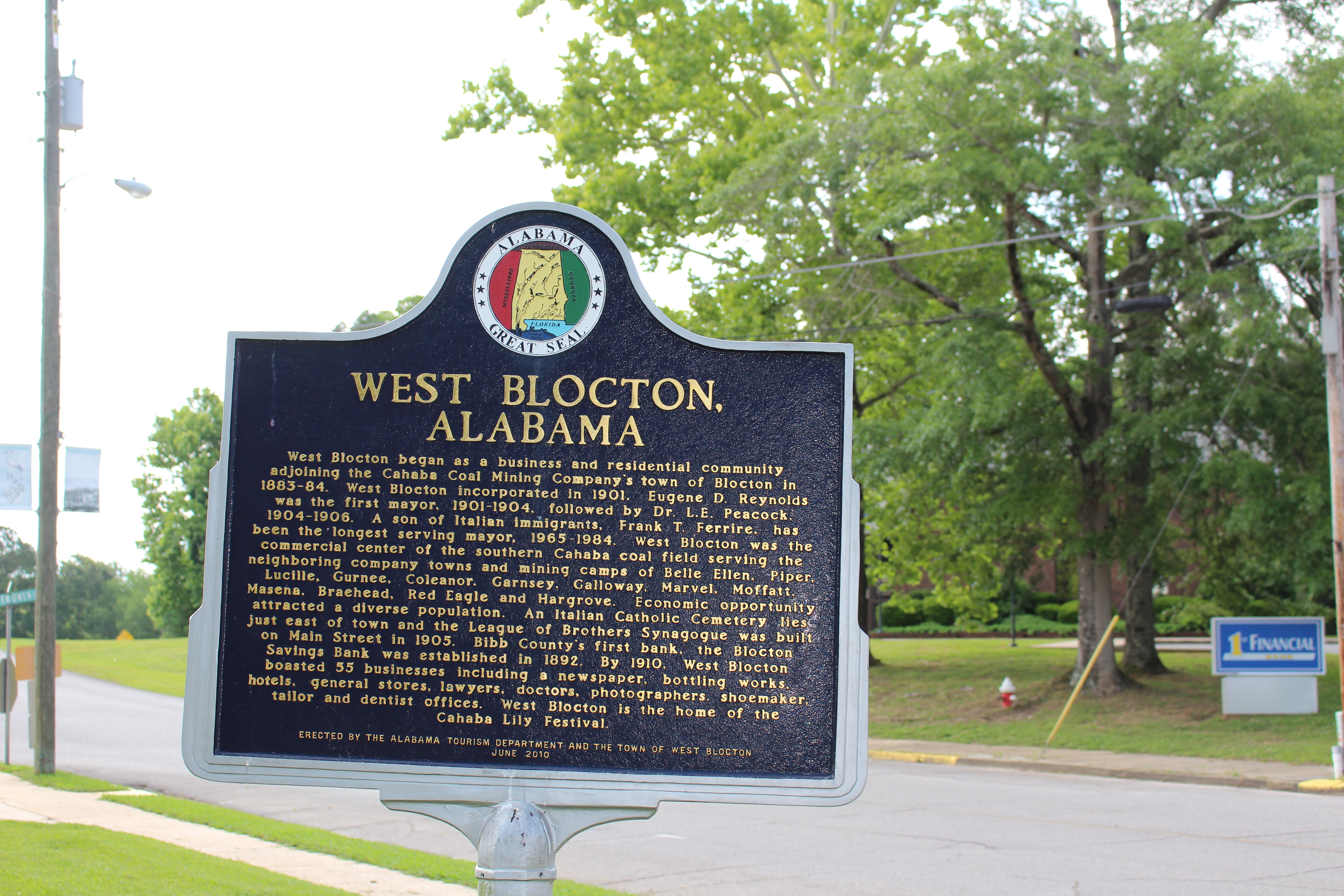
Historical marker summarizing West Blocton's history.

West Blocton is located in northern Bibb County at 33°07′05″N 87°07′30″W (33.1181748, -87.1249954), near the southern terminus of the Appalachian Mountains.

Alabama State Route 5 passes through the town, west of the town center, leading north 7 miles (11 km) to Woodstock and south 12 miles (19 km) to Brent and Centreville, the county seat.

The community is 7 miles (11 km) south of Interstate 20 and Interstate 59.

According to the United States Census Bureau, the town has a total area of 4.822 square miles (12.49 km^{2}), of which, 4.798 square miles (12.43 km^{2}) is land and 0.024 square miles (0.06 km^{2}), or 0.52%, is water.

West Blocton Coke Ovens Park preserves an area that once housed 460 beehive coke ovens. The park includes a boardwalk and other walking paths, a wildflower garden and birdwatching opportunities.

== Demographics ==
Historical population
Census	Pop.	Note	%±
1910	892		—
1920	1,023		14.7%
1930	1,070		4.6%
1940	1,317		23.1%
1950	1,280		−2.8%
1960	1,156		−9.7%
1970	1,172		1.4%
1980	1,147		−2.1%
1990	1,468		28.0%
2000	1,372		−6.5%
2010	1,240		−9.6%
2020	1,217		−1.9%
2023 (est.)	1,189	▼	−2.3%
U.S. Decennial Census; 2020 Census

=== 2020 census ===
West Blocton, Alabama – Racial Composition (NH = Non-Hispanic) Note: the US Census treats Hispanic/Latino as an ethnic category. This table excludes Latinos from the racial categories and assigns them to a separate category. Hispanics/Latinos can be of any race.
Race	Number	Percentage
White (NH)	967	79.46%
Black or African American (NH)	162	13.31%
Native American or Alaska Native (NH)	1	0.08%
Asian (NH)	5	0.41%
Pacific Islander (NH)	1	0.08%
Some Other Race (NH)	3	0.20%
Mixed/Multi-Racial (NH)	34	2.80%
Hispanic or Latino	44	3.62%
Total	1,217	100.00%

As of the 2020 census, there were 1,217 people, 506 households, and 334 families residing in the town. The median age was 42.5 years. 21.5% of residents were under the age of 18 and 18.3% were 65 years of age or older. For every 100 females, there were 99.5 males, and for every 100 females age 18 and over, there were 96.5 males age 18 and over.

0.0% of residents lived in urban areas, while 100.0% lived in rural areas.

Of all households, 29.8% had children under the age of 18 living in them. 42.7% were married-couple households, 23.3% were households with a male householder and no spouse or partner present, and 28.5% were households with a female householder and no spouse or partner present. About 25.9% of all households were made up of individuals, and 10.1% had someone living alone who was 65 years of age or older.

There were 583 housing units, of which 13.2% were vacant. The homeowner vacancy rate was 2.3% and the rental vacancy rate was 3.3%.

=== 2010 census ===
As of the 2010 census, there were 1,240 people, 494 households, and 341 families residing in the town. The population density was 271 inhabitants per square mile (105/km^{2}). There were 576 housing units at an average density of 125.2 per square mile (48.3/km^{2}). The racial makeup of the town was 85.6% White, 13.2% Black or African American, 0.4% Native American, 0.1% from other races, and 0.6% from two or more races. 0.1% of the population were Hispanic or Latino of any race.

There were 494 households, out of which 22.3% had children under the age of 18 living with them, 49.6% were married couples living together, 14.6% had a female householder with no husband present, and 31.0% were non-families. 29.1% of all households were made up of individuals, and 14.7% had someone living alone who was 65 years of age or older. The average household size was 2.51 and the average family size was 3.10.

In the town, the population was spread out, with 22.8% under the age of 18, 7.2% from 18 to 24, 25.1% from 25 to 44, 27.2% from 45 to 64, and 17.7% who were 65 years of age or older. The median age was 41.1 years. For every 100 females, there were 93.1 males. For every 100 females age 18 and over, there were 101.9 males.

The median income for a household in the town was $34,844, and the median income for a family was $59,875. Males had a median income of $37,384 versus $31,167 for females. The per capita income for the town was $22,224. About 11.3% of families and 11.4% of the population were below the poverty line, including 12.2% of those under age 18 and 12.0% of those age 65 or over.

== Economy ==
The community's original economy was coal. By 2002 industry left the town. Robert Dewitt of the Tuscaloosa News stated that the community remained active despite the lack of jobs, and that "While downtown West Blocton is a shell of its former self, the place isn’t a ghost town."

== Notable people ==
- Mel Allen, broadcaster for the New York Yankees, was a frequent visitor to West Blocton, where his grandfather, Julius Israel, resided as a boy.
- Sammie Lee Hill, who was drafted in the fourth round of the 2009 NFL draft by the Detroit Lions, was born in West Blocton in 1986. He is a graduate of West Blocton High School and Stillman College.
- Debra Marshall, known from her days with the WCW and WWE, was raised in West Blocton.
- Frank Pratt, former baseball player for the Chicago White Sox, was born in Blocton, a town to the east of West Blocton that no longer exists.
- Colonel James B. Swindal, U.S. Air Force, pilot of Air Force One during the administrations of Presidents John F. Kennedy and Lyndon B. Johnson; including Texas trip during which Kennedy was assassinated; born in West Blocton.

== Education ==
Bibb County School District operates West Blocton High School.

== Trivia ==
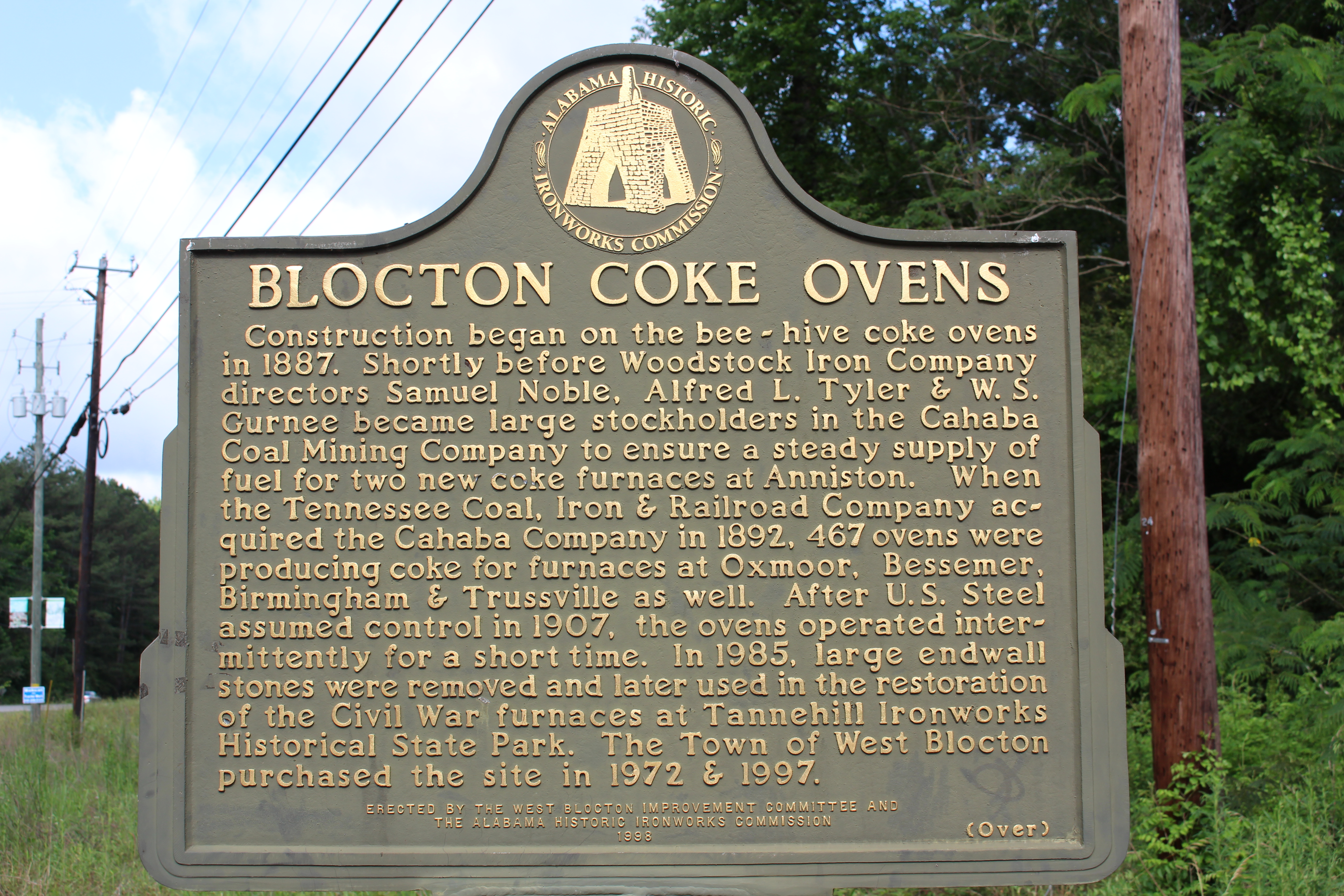
- Historical marker commemorating West Blocton's beehive coke ovens.
  West Blocton is known for its historic beehive ovens, built in the late 1880s for coke production.
- A feature-length documentary, West Blocton: Small Town, Big Heart, was made in 2012 by Michael J. Logan, an independent filmmaker whose family is from the town. The film covers the history of West Blocton from its inception in 1884 as a coal mining town until present day.

== Climate ==
The climate in this area is characterized by hot, humid summers and generally mild to cool winters. According to the Köppen Climate Classification system, West Blocton has a humid subtropical climate, abbreviated "Cfa" on climate maps.
