= Bibb County, Alabama =

County in Alabama, United States

- County
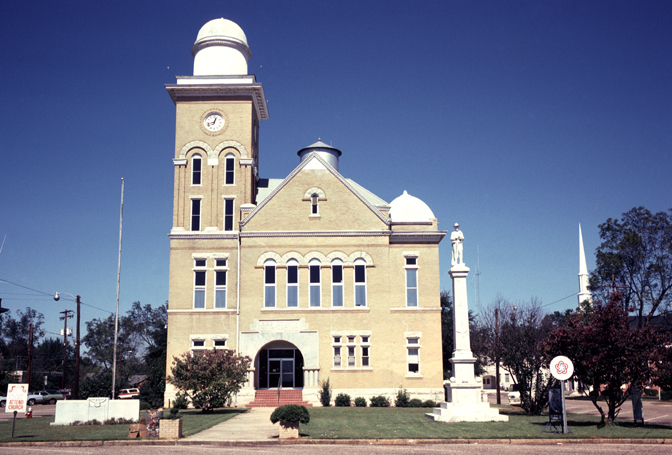
- Bibb County Courthouse and Confederate monument in Centreville

- Location within the U.S. state of Alabama
- Coordinates: 32°59′52″N 87°07′35″W
- Country: United States
- State: Alabama
- Founded: February 7, 1818
- Named for: William W. Bibb
- Seat: Centreville
- Largest city: Brent

Area
  - Total: 626 sq mi (1,620 km^{2})
  - Land: 623 sq mi (1,610 km^{2})
  - Water: 3.6 sq mi (9.3 km^{2}) 0.6%

Population (2020)
  - Total: 22,293
  - Estimate (2025): 22,262 ▼
  - Density: 35.8/sq mi (13.8/km^{2})
- Time zone: UTC−6 (Central)
  - Summer (DST): UTC−5 (CDT)
- Congressional district: 6th
- Website: www.bibbal.com
- County Number 07 on Alabama License Plates

Bibb County is a county in the central portion of the U.S. state of Alabama. The county is a part of the Birmingham, AL Metropolitan Statistical Area, and is included in the ARC's definition of Appalachia. As of the 24th decennial 2020 census, its population was 22,293. The county seat is Centreville. The county is named in honor of William W. Bibb (1781–1820), the Governor of Alabama Territory (1817–1819) and the first Governor of Alabama (1819–1820, when he died). He is also the namesake for Bibb County, Georgia, where he began his political career. It is a "prohibition" or dry county; however, a few towns have become "wet" by allowing the sale of alcoholic beverages: Woodstock (December 2017), West Blocton (August 2012), Centreville (June 2010), and Brent (May 2010). The Bibb County Courthouse is located in the county seat of Centreville.

== History ==
Cahawba County was established ("erected") on February 7, 1818, named for the Cahawba River (now more commonly known as Cahaba River). This name came from the Choctaw language word meaning "water above." On December 4, 1820, it was renamed as Bibb County.

In the wake of the American Civil War, the state legislature passed laws to create a new constitution that raised barriers to voter registration and effectively excluded Freedmen from the political process. Many residents resisted the objectives of Union occupation both during and after Reconstruction because they wanted to restore the Antebellum social and political norms. During this time of transition, Bibb, Dallas, and Pickens counties held the third-highest number of lynchings in the state. On June 18, 1919, Jim McMillan was lynched by a White mob. On November 7, 2000, Bibb County voted against a proposed amendment to Alabama's constitution to abolish the prohibition of interracial marriages.

== Geography ==
According to the United States Census Bureau, the county has a total area of 626 square miles (1,620 km^{2}), of which 623 square miles (1,610 km^{2}) is land and 3.6 square miles (9.3 km^{2}) (0.6%) is water.

=== Adjacent counties ===
- Jefferson County - north
- Shelby County - northeast
- Chilton County - southeast
- Perry County - southwest
- Hale County - southwest
- Tuscaloosa County - northwest

=== National protected areas ===
- Cahaba River National Wildlife Refuge
- Talladega National Forest (part)

== Endemic species ==
Several species of plants are endemic to Bibb County, Alabama; that is, they grow in this county and nowhere else in the world.

- Xyris spathifolia
- Dalea cahaba
- Spigelia alabamensis
- Lithospermum decipiens
- Solanum pumilum
- Castilleja kraliana
- Erigeron dolomiticola
- Liatris oligocephala
- Silphium glutinosum

== Transportation ==
=== Major highways ===
- U.S. Highway 11 / State Route 7 (unsigned)
- U.S. Highway 82 / State Route 6 (unsigned)
- State Route 5
- State Route 25
- State Route 58
- State Route 139
- State Route 209
- State Route 219
- State Route 382

=== Rail ===
- Norfolk Southern Railway

== Demographics ==
Historical population
Census	Pop.	Note	%±
1820	3,676		—
1830	6,306		71.5%
1840	8,284		31.4%
1850	9,969		20.3%
1860	11,894		19.3%
1870	7,469		−37.2%
1880	9,487		27.0%
1890	13,824		45.7%
1900	18,498		33.8%
1910	22,791		23.2%
1920	23,144		1.5%
1930	20,780		−10.2%
1940	20,155		−3.0%
1950	17,987		−10.8%
1960	14,357		−20.2%
1970	13,812		−3.8%
1980	15,723		13.8%
1990	16,576		5.4%
2000	20,826		25.6%
2010	22,915		10.0%
2020	22,293		−2.7%
2025 (est.)	22,262	▼	−0.1%
U.S. Decennial Census; 1790–1960 1900–1990; 1990–2000 2010–2020

=== Racial and ethnic composition ===
Bibb County, Alabama – Racial and ethnic composition Note: the US Census treats Hispanic/Latino as an ethnic category. This table excludes Latinos from the racial categories and assigns them to a separate category. Hispanics/Latinos may be of any race.
Race / Ethnicity (NH = Non-Hispanic)	Pop 2000	Pop 2010	Pop 2020	% 2000	% 2010	% 2020
White alone (NH)	15,870	17,191	16,442	76.20%	75.02%	73.75%
Black or African American alone (NH)	4,584	5,024	4,390	22.01%	21.92%	19.69%
Native American or Alaska Native alone (NH)	46	64	39	0.22%	0.28%	0.17%
Asian alone (NH)	17	22	26	0.08%	0.10%	0.12%
Pacific Islander alone (NH)	2	7	9	0.01%	0.03%	0.04%
Other race alone (NH)	0	20	47	0.00%	0.09%	0.21%
Mixed race or Multiracial (NH)	97	181	600	0.47%	0.79%	2.69%
Hispanic or Latino (any race)	210	406	740	1.01%	1.77%	3.32%
Total	20,826	22,915	22,293	100.00%	100.00%	100.00%

=== 2020 census ===
As of the 2020 census, the county had a population of 22,293. The median age was 40.5 years. 21.4% of residents were under the age of 18 and 16.2% of residents were 65 years of age or older. For every 100 females there were 112.4 males, and for every 100 females age 18 and over there were 114.9 males age 18 and over.

The racial makeup of the county was 74.3% White, 19.8% Black or African American, 0.3% American Indian and Alaska Native, 0.1% Asian, 0.0% Native Hawaiian and Pacific Islander, 2.1% from some other race, and 3.4% from two or more races. Hispanic or Latino residents of any race comprised 3.3% of the population.

0.0% of residents lived in urban areas, while 100.0% lived in rural areas.

There were 7,927 households in the county, of which 32.5% had children under the age of 18 living with them and 27.5% had a female householder with no spouse or partner present. About 27.0% of all households were made up of individuals and 11.8% had someone living alone who was 65 years of age or older.

There were 9,002 housing units, of which 11.9% were vacant. Among occupied housing units, 74.8% were owner-occupied and 25.2% were renter-occupied. The homeowner vacancy rate was 1.4% and the rental vacancy rate was 6.6%.

=== 2010 census ===
As of the census of 2010, there were 22,915 people, 7,953 households, and 5,748 families residing in the county. The population density was 37 people per square mile (14 people/km^{2}). There were 8,981 housing units at an average density of 14.3 units per square mile (5.5 units/km^{2}). The racial makeup of the county was 75.8% White, 22.0% Black or African American, 0.3% Native American, 0.1% Asian, 0.1% Pacific Islander, 0.8% from other races, and 0.9% from two or more races. Of the population, 1.8% were Hispanic or Latino of any race.

There were 7,953 households, out of which 29.5% had children under the age of 18 living with them, 52.5% were married couples living together, 14.4% had a female householder with no husband present, and 27.7% were non-families. Of all households, 24.5% were made up of individuals, and 9.40% had someone living alone who was 65 years of age or older. The average household size was 2.60 and the average family size was 3.09.

In the county, the population was spread out, with 22.7% under the age of 18, 9.0% from 18 to 24, 28.9% from 25 to 44, 26.7% from 45 to 64, and 12.7% who were 65 years of age or older. The median age was 37.8 years. For every 100 females, there were 115.9 males. For every 100 females age 18 and over, there were 127.5 males.

The median income for a household in the county was $41,770, and the median income for a family was $51,956. Males had a median income of $40,219 versus $28,085 for females. The per capita income for the county was $19,918. About 9.4% of families and 12.6% of the population were below the poverty line, including 18.4% of those under age 18 and 11.3% of those age 65 or over.

=== Rural flight ===
From 1920 to 1970, the population of the rural county declined considerably. Many African Americans joined the Great Migration to northern and western cities, to escape the violence and racial oppression of Jim Crow.

== Education ==
Bibb County contains one public school district. There are approximately 3,100 students in public K-12 schools in Bibb County.

=== Districts ===
School districts include:

- Bibb County School District

== Government and infrastructure ==
United States presidential election results for Bibb County, Alabama
Year	Republican		Democratic		Third party(ies)	
Year	No.	%	No.	%	No.	%
1904	155	11.87%	1,085	83.08%	66	5.05%
1908	139	15.14%	670	72.98%	109	11.87%
1912	40	3.51%	820	71.87%	281	24.63%
1916	217	13.67%	1,247	78.58%	123	7.75%
1920	364	16.95%	1,643	76.49%	141	6.56%
1924	251	18.27%	875	63.68%	248	18.05%
1928	1,003	45.61%	1,188	54.02%	8	0.36%
1932	145	8.00%	1,636	90.29%	31	1.71%
1936	190	9.20%	1,868	90.42%	8	0.39%
1940	173	8.60%	1,821	90.51%	18	0.89%
1944	244	15.78%	1,287	83.25%	15	0.97%
1948	123	9.16%	0	0.00%	1,220	90.84%
1952	784	28.31%	1,971	71.18%	14	0.51%
1956	1,004	38.88%	1,471	56.97%	107	4.14%
1960	1,052	38.23%	1,697	61.66%	3	0.11%
1964	2,623	83.94%	0	0.00%	502	16.06%
1968	263	5.63%	652	13.95%	3,758	80.42%
1972	3,332	78.44%	837	19.70%	79	1.86%
1976	1,591	35.56%	2,850	63.70%	33	0.74%
1980	2,491	44.30%	3,097	55.08%	35	0.62%
1984	3,487	61.32%	2,167	38.10%	33	0.58%
1988	2,885	56.06%	2,244	43.61%	17	0.33%
1992	3,124	46.49%	2,900	43.15%	696	10.36%
1996	3,037	48.20%	2,775	44.04%	489	7.76%
2000	4,273	60.17%	2,710	38.16%	118	1.66%
2004	5,472	72.00%	2,089	27.49%	39	0.51%
2008	6,262	72.44%	2,299	26.60%	83	0.96%
2012	6,132	72.83%	2,202	26.15%	86	1.02%
2016	6,738	76.40%	1,874	21.25%	207	2.35%
2020	7,525	78.43%	1,986	20.70%	84	0.88%
2024	7,572	81.80%	1,619	17.49%	66	0.71%

United States Senate election results for Bibb County, Alabama2
Year	Republican		Democratic		Third party(ies)	
Year	No.	%	No.	%	No.	%
2020	7,320	76.40%	2,244	23.42%	17	0.18%

United States Senate election results for Bibb County, Alabama3
Year	Republican		Democratic		Third party(ies)	
Year	No.	%	No.	%	No.	%
2022	4,694	79.98%	971	16.54%	204	3.48%

Alabama Gubernatorial election results for Bibb County
Year	Republican		Democratic		Third party(ies)	
Year	No.	%	No.	%	No.	%
2022	4,681	79.55%	930	15.81%	273	4.64%

Bibb County has a five-member County Commission, elected from single-member districts. Members take turns in serving as chairman of the commission, rotating the position every nine and a half months.

Alabama Department of Corrections operates the Bibb Correctional Facility in Brent.

Bibb County is reliably Republican at the presidential level. The last Democrat to win the county in a presidential election was Jimmy Carter, who won it by a majority in 1980 despite narrowly losing the state of Alabama to Ronald Reagan. The county strongly supported independent pro-segregation presidential candidates Strom Thurmond in 1948 and George Wallace in 1968.

== Communities ==
=== Cities ===
- Brent
- Centreville (County Seat)

=== Towns ===
- Vance (Partly in Tuscaloosa County)
- West Blocton
- Woodstock (Partly in Tuscaloosa County)

=== Unincorporated communities ===
- Active
- Antioch
- Brierfield
- Coleanor
- Eoline
- Gary Springs
- Green Pond
- Lawley
- Little Hope
- Marvel
- Piper
- Randolph
- Sand Mountain
- Sixmile

=== Ghost towns ===
- Cadle (also Ardela, Cadle Station) — former railroad flag stop on the Southern Railway, named for Cornelius Cadle, co-founder of the Cahaba Coal Mining Company; mapped as Cadle (1890–1894) and later as Ardela (1902–1971)

== Places of interest ==
Bibb County is home to the Talladega National Forest supervised by the United States Forestry Service (of the U.S. Department of Agriculture), and a section of the Cahaba River which draws visitors to view the unique "Cahaba Lily" (known by its scientific Latinized name Hymenocallis coronaria).

== See also ==
- National Register of Historic Places listings in Bibb County, Alabama
- Properties on the Alabama Register of Landmarks and Heritage in Bibb County, Alabama
