= Centreville, Alabama =

City in and county seat of Bibb County, Alabama

Centreville
- City
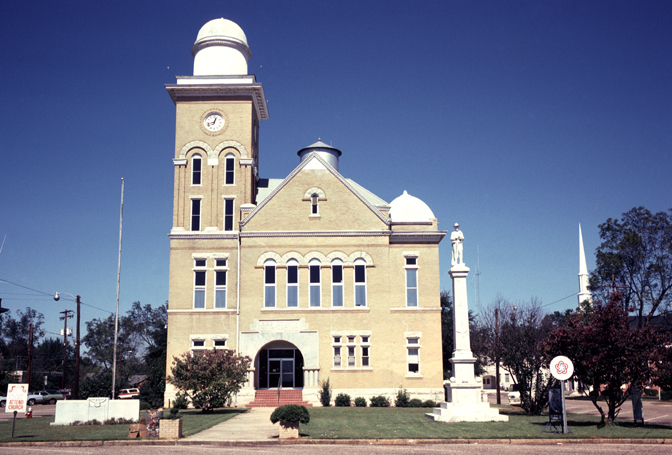
- Bibb County Courthouse in Centreville

- Logo

- Location of Centreville in Bibb County, Alabama.
- Coordinates: 32°57′0″N 87°8′4″W
- Country: United States
- State: Alabama
- County: Bibb
- Founded: 1823
- Incorporated: 1832
- Founder: Sarah Willis Chotard

Government
  - Mayor: Mike Oakley

Area
  - Total: 9.60 sq mi (24.86 km^{2})
  - Land: 9.45 sq mi (24.48 km^{2})
  - Water: 0.15 sq mi (0.38 km^{2})
- Elevation: 253 ft (77 m)

Population (2020)
  - Total: 2,800
  - Density: 296.3/sq mi (114.39/km^{2})
- Time zone: UTC-6 (Central (CST))
  - Summer (DST): UTC-5 (CDT)
- ZIP code: 35042
- Area codes: 205, 659
- FIPS code: 01-13672
- GNIS feature ID: 0159359
- Website: cityofcentreville.com

Centreville is a city in and the county seat of Bibb County, Alabama, United States. At the 2020 census, the population was 2,800.

== Geography ==
According to the U.S. Census Bureau, Centreville has a total area of 9.6 square miles (24.9 km^{2}), of which 9.5 square miles (24.5 km^{2}) are land and 0.15 square miles (0.4 km^{2}), or 1.52%, is water. The city is bordered to the west by the city of Brent by the Cahaba River.

The city is located in the central part of the state along U.S. Route 82, which runs from southeast to northwest to the north of the city, leading southeast 70 mi (110 km) to Montgomery, the state capital, and northwest 35 mi (56 km) to Tuscaloosa. Alabama State Routes 25 and 219 both run through the center of the city from south to north. AL-25 leads northeast 21 mi (34 km) to Montevallo and southwest 38 mi (61 km) to Greensboro. AL-219 leads north 7 mi (11 km) to Alabama State Route 5 north of Brent and south 42 mi (68 km) to Selma.

=== Climate ===
The climate in this area is characterized by hot, humid summers and generally mild to cool winters. According to the Köppen Climate Classification system, Centreville has a humid subtropical climate, abbreviated Cfa on climate maps.

Centreville is the site of the highest recorded temperature in the state of Alabama, when on September 6, 1925, the temperature reached 112 °F or 44.4 °C. The data below are for the years 1916 to 1974.

Climate data for Centreville, Alabama, 1991–2020 normals, extremes 1917–2014
Month	Jan	Feb	Mar	Apr	May	Jun	Jul	Aug	Sep	Oct	Nov	Dec	Year
Record high °F (°C)	82 (28)	86 (30)	91 (33)	94 (34)	98 (37)	105 (41)	109 (43)	106 (41)	112 (44)	101 (38)	93 (34)	82 (28)	112 (44)
Mean maximum °F (°C)	72.7 (22.6)	76.8 (24.9)	82.8 (28.2)	86.0 (30.0)	90.6 (32.6)	95.0 (35.0)	96.6 (35.9)	96.3 (35.7)	93.6 (34.2)	87.1 (30.6)	80.2 (26.8)	73.9 (23.3)	98.3 (36.8)
Mean daily maximum °F (°C)	55.3 (12.9)	59.4 (15.2)	67.8 (19.9)	75.0 (23.9)	82.2 (27.9)	88.1 (31.2)	90.7 (32.6)	90.4 (32.4)	85.7 (29.8)	76.2 (24.6)	65.3 (18.5)	57.2 (14.0)	74.4 (23.6)
Daily mean °F (°C)	43.5 (6.4)	47.2 (8.4)	53.8 (12.1)	60.9 (16.1)	69.0 (20.6)	76.2 (24.6)	79.3 (26.3)	78.8 (26.0)	73.5 (23.1)	62.9 (17.2)	51.8 (11.0)	45.6 (7.6)	61.9 (16.6)
Mean daily minimum °F (°C)	31.7 (−0.2)	34.9 (1.6)	39.9 (4.4)	46.7 (8.2)	55.8 (13.2)	64.3 (17.9)	67.9 (19.9)	67.3 (19.6)	61.4 (16.3)	49.7 (9.8)	38.2 (3.4)	34.0 (1.1)	49.3 (9.6)
Mean minimum °F (°C)	15.6 (−9.1)	19.5 (−6.9)	25.3 (−3.7)	32.9 (0.5)	44.2 (6.8)	56.0 (13.3)	63.1 (17.3)	62.0 (16.7)	47.9 (8.8)	34.4 (1.3)	26.0 (−3.3)	18.4 (−7.6)	11.7 (−11.3)
Record low °F (°C)	−6 (−21)	5 (−15)	13 (−11)	26 (−3)	33 (1)	40 (4)	53 (12)	51 (11)	33 (1)	23 (−5)	10 (−12)	1 (−17)	−6 (−21)
Average precipitation inches (mm)	5.33 (135)	5.85 (149)	5.56 (141)	4.74 (120)	3.69 (94)	4.56 (116)	4.39 (112)	4.98 (126)	4.50 (114)	3.26 (83)	4.78 (121)	5.37 (136)	57.01 (1,447)
Average snowfall inches (cm)	0.1 (0.25)	0.0 (0.0)	0.5 (1.3)	0.0 (0.0)	0.0 (0.0)	0.0 (0.0)	0.0 (0.0)	0.0 (0.0)	0.0 (0.0)	0.0 (0.0)	0.0 (0.0)	0.1 (0.25)	0.7 (1.8)
Average precipitation days (≥ 0.01 in)	9.8	10.1	9.3	8.3	8.2	10.1	11.0	10.4	7.1	6.4	8.1	9.8	108.6
Average snowy days (≥ 0.1 in)	0.0	0.0	0.1	0.0	0.0	0.0	0.0	0.0	0.0	0.0	0.0	0.0	0.1
Source 1: NOAA
Source 2: XMACIS2 (mean maxima/minima 1981–2010)

== Demographics ==
Historical population
Census	Pop.	Note	%±
1890	239		—
1900	422		76.6%
1910	730		73.0%
1920	793		8.6%
1930	791		−0.3%
1940	893		12.9%
1950	1,160		29.9%
1960	1,981		70.8%
1970	2,233		12.7%
1980	2,504		12.1%
1990	2,508		0.2%
2000	2,466		−1.7%
2010	2,778		12.7%
2020	2,800		0.8%
U.S. Decennial Census; 2013 Estimate

=== Racial and ethnic composition ===
Centreville city, Alabama – Racial and ethnic composition Note: the US Census treats Hispanic/Latino as an ethnic category. This table excludes Latinos from the racial categories and assigns them to a separate category. Hispanics/Latinos may be of any race.
Race / Ethnicity (NH = Non-Hispanic)	Pop 1980	Pop 1990	Pop 2000	Pop 2010	Pop 2020	% 1980	% 1990	% 2000	% 2010	% 2020
White alone (NH)	2,002	1,876	1,845	1,997	1,931	79.95%	74.80%	74.82%	71.89%	68.96%
Black or African American alone (NH)	407	616	561	655	685	16.25%	24.56%	22.75%	23.58%	24.46%
Native American or Alaska Native alone (NH)	0	1	2	7	9	0.00%	0.04%	0.08%	0.25%	0.32%
Asian alone (NH)	3	5	3	10	3	0.12%	0.20%	0.12%	0.36%	0.11%
Native Hawaiian or Pacific Islander alone (NH)	x	x	0	0	0	x	x	0.00%	0.00%	0.00%
Other race alone (NH)	0	0	0	2	4	0.00%	0.00%	0.00%	0.07%	0.14%
Mixed race or Multiracial (NH)	x	x	12	25	61	x	x	0.49%	0.90%	2.18%
Hispanic or Latino (any race)	92	10	43	82	107	3.67%	0.40%	1.74%	2.95%	3.82%
Total	2,504	2,508	2,466	2,778	2,800	100.00%	100.00%	100.00%	100.00%	100.00%

=== 2020 census ===
As of the 2020 census, Centreville had a population of 2,800 in 1,057 households, including 599 families. The median age was 45.4 years. 21.7% of residents were under the age of 18 and 25.8% of residents were 65 years of age or older. For every 100 females there were 83.1 males, and for every 100 females age 18 and over there were 77.0 males age 18 and over.

0.0% of residents lived in urban areas, while 100.0% lived in rural areas.

There were 1,057 households in Centreville, of which 31.8% had children under the age of 18 living in them. Of all households, 42.8% were married-couple households, 17.5% were households with a male householder and no spouse or partner present, and 34.3% were households with a female householder and no spouse or partner present. About 32.7% of all households were made up of individuals and 17.1% had someone living alone who was 65 years of age or older.

There were 1,204 housing units, of which 12.2% were vacant. The homeowner vacancy rate was 3.0% and the rental vacancy rate was 7.1%.

=== 2010 census ===
As of the census of 2010, there were 2,778 people, 1,066 households, and 729 families residing in the city. The population density was 294 inhabitants per square mile (114/km^{2}). There were 1,178 housing units at an average density of 122 per square mile (47/km^{2}). The racial makeup of the city was 72.2% White, 23.7% Black or African American, 0.3% Native American, 0.4% Asian, 2.4% from other races, and 1.1% from two or more races. 3.0% of the population were Hispanic or Latino of any race.

There were 1,066 households, of which 29.7% had children under the age of 18 living with them, 47.2% were married couples living together, 15.9% had a female householder with no husband present, and 31.6% were non-families. 29.0% of all households were made up of individuals, and 14.2% had someone living alone who was 65 years of age or older. The average household size was 2.50 and the average family size was 3.07

In the city, the population was spread out, with 23.8% under the age of 18, 9.0% from 18 to 24, 24.6% from 25 to 44, 24.6% from 45 to 64, and 18.1% who were 65 years of age or older. The median age was 39 years. For every 100 females, there were 92.6 males. For every 100 females age 18 and over, there were 95.0 males.

The median income for a household in the city was $31,642, and the median income for a family was $58,000. Males had a median income of $37,614 versus $17,088 for females. The per capita income for the city was $18,172. About 13.5% of families and 15.9% of the population were below the poverty line, including 10.1% of those under age 18 and 1.1% of those age 65 or over.

== History ==
The Cahaba River falls near Centreville, which made the town a strategic location for transportation through the region. The first post office in Bibb County was established in Centreville in 1821. Sarah Willis Chotard obtained a patent for land in this area in 1823 and began moving squatters off the land and laid out a plot for the new town of Centreville.

In 1829, Centreville became the permanent seat for Bibb County after several years of debate and different locations of the county courthouse, and the town was incorporated in 1832. Centreville's historic district is listed on the National Register of Historic Places.

On May 27, 1973, a violent tornado struck the city, causing major damage across the area.

On March 25, 2021, a violent tornado hit the southern and eastern portions of Centreville, causing significant damage to the area and rendering the Bibb County Airport a total loss.

=== 1910 lynching ===
In 1910, a white woman by the name of Mrs. Crow gave birth to a child of "doubtful color", who was thought by many to be the product of a relationship between Crow and an African American, and she was accused of having such a relationship. At first she vigorously denied it, but then – under intense peer pressure – she confessed to the baby's origin but claimed that she had been raped. When asked if she knew who raped her, Crow gave them the name of Grant Richardson, an African American who lived near the Braehead Slope Mine Camp, northeast of Centreville. The miners and other local residents were so incensed at the affair that they decided to apply "summary vengeance" to Richardson as soon as they knew that the sheriff had apprehended him.

Deputy Sheriff Cam Riley apprehended Richardson on October 12, 1910, and was returning him to the jail at Centreville for processing and trial, but was waylaid by a lynch mob. The mob took Richardson from Riley and shot the suspect. Chief Deputy Sheriff Charles Oakley investigated the scene as soon as word of the incident reached him, but other than the body, the shells, and the blood, there was little usable evidence to be found, much less witnesses. A coroner's inquest was held as soon as a special coroner was appointed, but there is no known result of that inquest. This was the first recorded lynching to take place in Bibb County.

It is unknown whether charges of either filing false charges resulting in a murder or miscegenation were filed against Crow, but it is known by those aware of Richardson that he had lived in the area for a number of years with a fair reputation prior to the incident.

== Education ==
Centreville is served by the Bibb County Public School District. Schools in Centreville include Bibb County High School (grades 9 through 12) and Centreville Middle School (grades 5 through 8). Cahawba Christian Academy is a private school serving grades pre-K to 12.

== Media ==
- WBIB 1110 AM (Southern Gospel)
- The Bibb Voice BibbVoice.com (Online News Publication)
- Centreville Press (Local News Paper)

== Notable people ==
- Henry Damon Davidson, educator and church elder
- Matt Downs, former Major League Baseball player, current Marion Military Institute baseball coach
- Franklin Potts Glass Sr., newspaper publisher and U.S. Senator-designate
- Henry James, former NBA player
- Ben Jones, offensive lineman for the Tennessee Titans
- Zac Stacy, former Vanderbilt University football player and running back for the New York Jets
- Fresco Thompson, major league baseball player and executive
