= National Register of Historic Places listings in Logan County, West Virginia =

Location of Logan County in West Virginia

This is a list of the National Register of Historic Places listings in Logan County, West Virginia.

This is intended to be a complete list of the properties and districts on the National Register of Historic Places in Logan County, West Virginia, United States. The locations of National Register properties and districts for which the latitude and longitude coordinates are included below, may be seen in an online map.

There are 5 properties listed on the National Register in the county.

This National Park Service list is complete through NPS recent listings posted March 21, 2025.

Contents: Counties in West Virginia

Barbour - Berkeley - Boone - Braxton - Brooke - Cabell - Calhoun - Clay - Doddridge - Fayette - Gilmer - Grant - Greenbrier - Hampshire - Hancock - Hardy - Harrison - Jackson - Jefferson - Kanawha - Lewis - Lincoln - Logan - Marion - Marshall - Mason - McDowell - Mercer - Mineral - Mingo - Monongalia - Monroe - Morgan - Nicholas - Ohio - Pendleton - Pleasants - Pocahontas - Preston - Putnam - Raleigh - Randolph - Ritchie - Roane - Summers - Taylor - Tucker - Tyler - Upshur - Wayne - Webster - Wetzel - Wirt - Wood - Wyoming

== Current listings ==
	Name on the Register	Image	Date listed	Location	City or town	Description
1	Blair Mountain Battlefield		March 30, 2009 (#08000496)	Address Restricted	Logan	Delisted December 30, 2009; reinstated June 27, 2018
2	Chafin House	Chafin House	March 28, 1994 (#94000217)	581 Main St. 37°50′41″N 81°59′09″W	Logan	
3	Chesapeake and Ohio 2755 Steam Locomotive	Chesapeake and Ohio 2755 Steam Locomotive	September 28, 2006 (#06000900)	500 feet from the junction of Little Buffalo Creek Rd. and Park Route 801; 37°53′34″N 82°00′36″W	Henlawson	
4	Hatfield Cemetery	Hatfield Cemetery	November 28, 1980 (#80004030)	South of Sarah Ann on WV 44; 37°42′24″N 81°59′43″W	Sarah Ann	
5	Cap Hatfield Gravesite		May 6, 2024 (#100010289)	Overlooking 81, Knights Landing Road; 37°43′06″N 81°59′35″W	Stirrat	

== See also ==
- List of National Historic Landmarks in West Virginia
- National Register of Historic Places listings in West Virginia
