= Monaville, West Virginia =

- Census-designated place
- Location within West Virginia Location within the United States
- Coordinates: 37°48′43″N 81°59′41″W
- Country: United States
- State: West Virginia
- County: Logan

Area
  - Total: 0.464 sq mi (1.20 km^{2})
  - Land: 0.457 sq mi (1.18 km^{2})
  - Water: 0.007 sq mi (0.018 km^{2})
- Elevation: 712 ft (217 m)

Population (2020)
  - Total: 302
  - Density: 676.1/sq mi (261.0/km^{2})
- Time zone: UTC-5 (Eastern (EST))
  - Summer (DST): UTC-4 (EDT)
- ZIP code: 25601
- FIPS code: 54-55132
- GNIS feature ID: 1543492

Monaville is an unincorporated community and census-designated place (CDP) in Logan County, West Virginia, United States. As of the 2020 census, its population was 302 (slightly down from 309 at the 2010 census).

== Geography ==
Monaville lies in central Logan County in the valley of Island Creek, a tributary of the Guyandotte River, 4 miles (6 km) south of the city of Logan, the county seat. Monaville is situated between the unincorporated communities of Wilkinson, to the north, and Rossmore, to the south. West Virginia Route 44 runs up the Island Creek valley, leading north (downstream) to Mount Gay just west of Logan, and south (upstream) 14 miles (23 km) to U.S. Route 52 near Pie.

According to the U.S. Census Bureau, the Monaville CDP has a total area of 0.46 square miles (1.2 km^{2}), of which 0.01 square miles (0.02 km^{2}), or 1.61%, are water.

== History ==
Monaville formerly held the US postal ZIP code 25636 until the post office was closed. Monaville was formerly known as "Vanceville" and was listed as such on a US Postal Service map of the late 1890s. The region was likely named for the Vance family who owned much of the land prior to the coal mining era.

The name is believed to have been changed to "Monaville" in honor of Mona Wilkinson, the daughter of a prominent coal mining official. The Logan Mining Company operated a coal mine here, and the name "Mona Mine" appears on a 1918 photo of the coal tipple.

Island Creek Coal Company, based in Holden, operated the #11 and #12 mines in this region. Monaville is the location of the Foster Armory, which houses a West Virginia National Guard unit. The state archives is currently rebuilding the original split-log Monaville schoolhouse in the basement of the state capitol complex.
