= Micco, West Virginia =

- Unincorporated community
- Location within West Virginia Location within the United States
- Coordinates: 37°46′58″N 81°59′24″W
- Country: United States
- State: West Virginia
- County: Logan
- Elevation: 778 ft (237 m)
- Time zone: UTC-5 (Eastern (EST))
  - Summer (DST): UTC-4 (EDT)
- Area codes: 304 & 681
- GNIS feature ID: 1543150

Micco is an unincorporated community in Logan County, West Virginia, United States. Micco is located along Island Creek and West Virginia Route 44, 4.5 miles (7.2 km) south of Logan. It is included in the Switzer census-designated place.

The community is named for Main Island Creek Coal Company (MICCO).
