= Switzer, West Virginia =

- Census-designated place
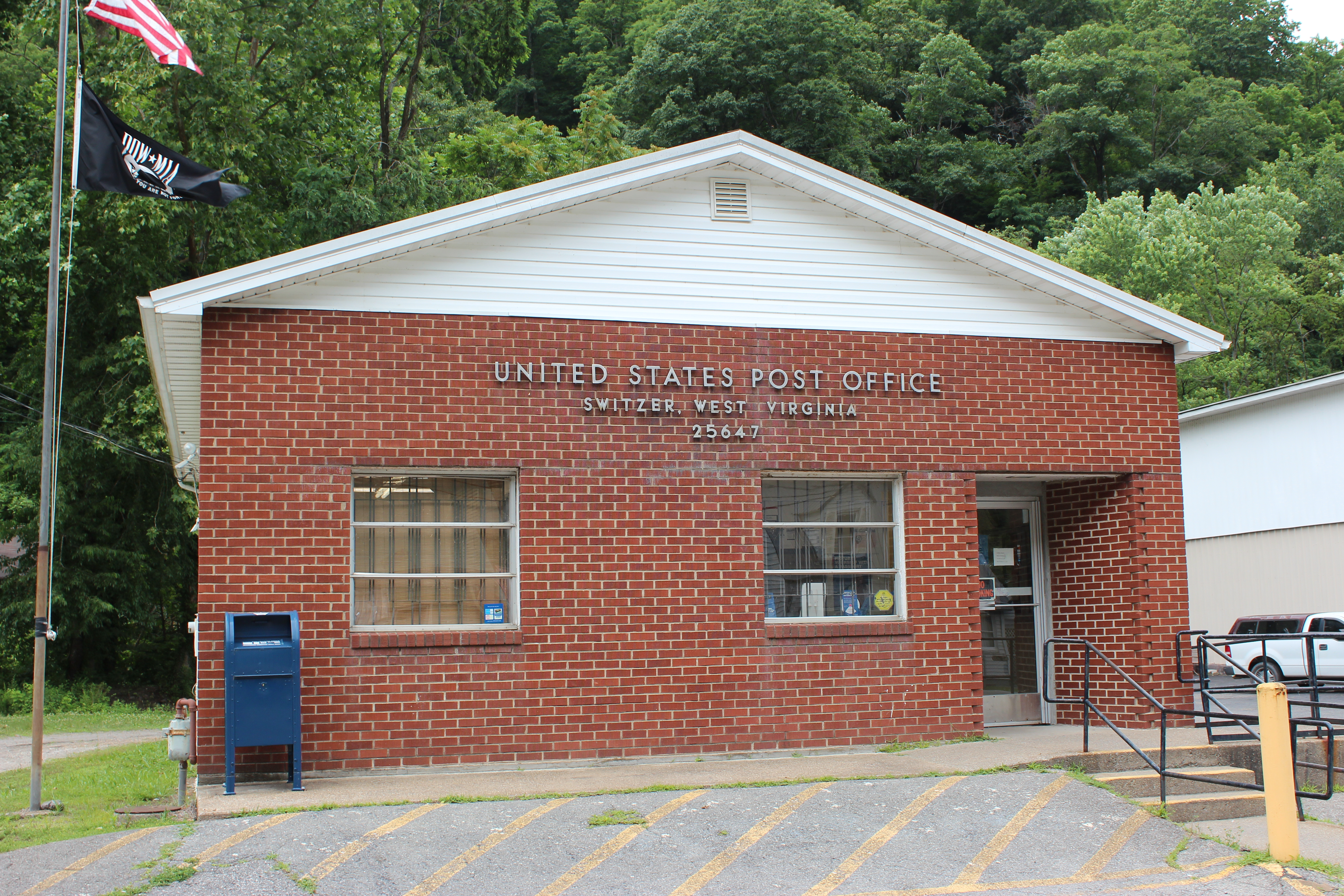
- Switzer Post Office

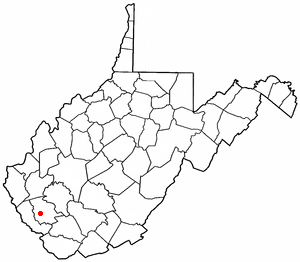
- Location of Switzer, West Virginia
- Coordinates: 37°47′37″N 81°59′15″W
- Country: United States
- State: West Virginia
- County: Logan

Area
  - Total: 2.36 sq mi (6.12 km^{2})
  - Land: 2.34 sq mi (6.06 km^{2})
  - Water: 0.023 sq mi (0.06 km^{2})
- Elevation: 745 ft (227 m)

Population (2020)
  - Total: 593
  - Density: 253/sq mi (97.9/km^{2})
- Time zone: UTC-5 (Eastern (EST))
  - Summer (DST): UTC-4 (EDT)
- ZIP code: 25647
- Area code: 304
- FIPS code: 54-78796
- GNIS feature ID: 1555771

Switzer is an unincorporated community and census-designated place (CDP) in Logan County, West Virginia, United States. The CDP includes the neighboring unincorporated community of Micco. The total CDP population was 593 at the 2020 census (slightly down from 595 at the 2010 census).

The community was, most likely, named after the local Switzer family.

== Geography ==
Switzer is located in southwestern Logan County along Island Creek and West Virginia Route 44. The CDP is bordered to the north by Rossmore and to the south by Chauncey. Via WV-44, it is 6 miles (10 km) north to Logan, the county seat.

According to the United States Census Bureau, the Switzer CDP has a total area of 2.4 square miles (6.1 km^{2}), of which 0.02 square miles (0.06 km^{2}), or 1.02%, are water. Via Island Creek, Switzer is part of the Guyandotte River watershed, flowing north to the Ohio River near Huntington.

== Demographics ==
At the 2000 census there were 1,138 people, 466 households, and 322 families in the CDP. The population density was 118.3 people per square mile (45.7 people/km^{2}). There were 537 housing units at an average density of 55.8 units per square mile (21.5 units/km^{2}). The racial makeup of the CDP was 95.78% White, 3.08% African American, 0.18% Native American, 0.09% Asian, 0.09% from other races, and 0.79% from two or more races. Hispanic or Latino of any race were 0.97%.

Of the 466 households 31.1% had children under the age of 18 living with them, 48.9% were married couples living together, 17.8% had a female householder with no husband present, and 30.9% were non-families. 27.3% of households were one person and 13.3% were one person aged 65 or older. The average household size was 2.44 and the average family size was 2.96.

The age distribution was 24.0% under the age of 18, 10.5% from 18 to 24, 27.2% from 25 to 44, 24.2% from 45 to 64, and 14.1% 65 or older. The median age was 38 years. For every 100 females, there were 82.1 males. For every 100 females age 18 and over, there were 78.7 males.

The median household income was $21,806 and the median family income was $30,341. Males had a median income of $33,125 versus $22,054 for females. The per capita income for the CDP was $13,410. About 17.4% of families and 23.3% of the population were below the poverty line, including 30.3% of those under age 18 and 18.6% of those age 65 or over.

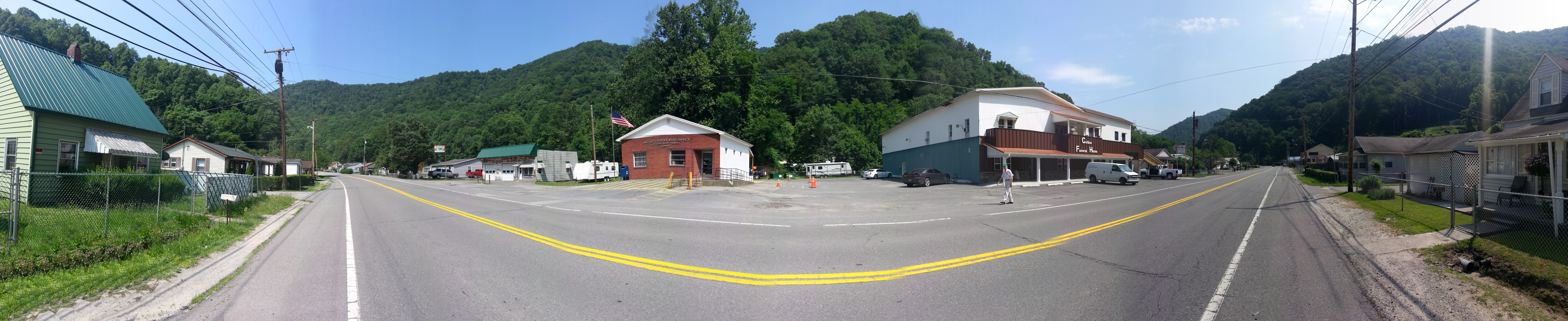
Route 44 in Switzer
