= Monitor, Logan County, West Virginia =

Monitor, West Virginia
- Unincorporated community
- Location within West Virginia Location within the United States
- Coordinates: 37°47′35″N 82°03′10″W
- Country: United States
- State: West Virginia
- County: Logan
- Elevation: 935 ft (285 m)
- Time zone: UTC-5 (Eastern (EST))
  - Summer (DST): UTC-4 (EDT)
- Area codes: 304 & 681
- GNIS feature ID: 1555862

Monitor is an unincorporated community in Logan County, West Virginia, United States. Monitor is located along Island Creek and West Virginia Route 44, 1.2 miles (1.9 km) south-southwest of Logan.
