= Superior Bottom, West Virginia =

- Unincorporated community
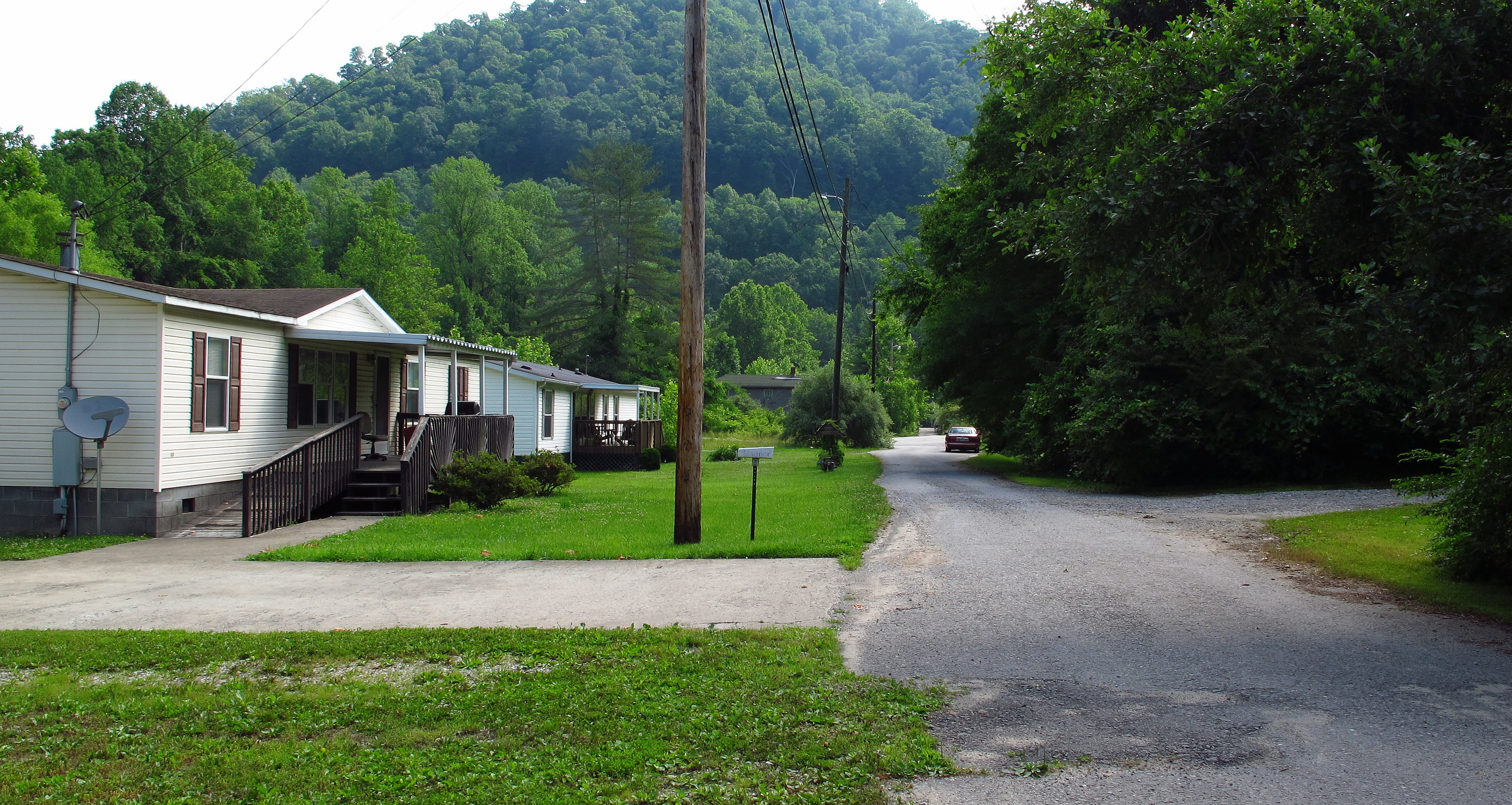
- Superior Bottom Road

- Location within West Virginia Location within the United States
- Coordinates: 37°44′56″N 81°59′57″W
- Country: United States
- State: West Virginia
- County: Logan
- Elevation: 840 ft (260 m)
- Time zone: UTC-5 (Eastern (EST))
  - Summer (DST): UTC-4 (EDT)
- Area codes: 304 & 681
- GNIS feature ID: 1555759

Superior Bottom is an unincorporated community in Logan County, West Virginia, United States. Superior Bottom is located along West Virginia Route 44 and Island Creek, 7 miles (11 km) south of Logan.
