= Verdunville, West Virginia =

- Census-designated place
- Location within West Virginia Location within the United States
- Coordinates: 37°50′40″N 82°03′18″W
- Country: United States
- State: West Virginia
- County: Logan

Area
  - Total: 2.673 sq mi (6.92 km^{2})
  - Land: 2.671 sq mi (6.92 km^{2})
  - Water: 0.002 sq mi (0.0052 km^{2})
- Elevation: 879 ft (268 m)

Population (2020)
  - Total: 491
  - Density: 184/sq mi (71.0/km^{2})
- Time zone: UTC-5 (Eastern (EST))
  - Summer (DST): UTC-4 (EDT)
- ZIP code: 25649
- Area codes: 304 & 681
- GNIS feature ID: 1548644
- FIPS code: 54-83332

Verdunville is an unincorporated community and census-designated place (CDP) in Logan County, West Virginia, United States. It is 3.5 miles (5.6 km) west of Logan, the county seat. Verdunville has a post office with ZIP code 25649. The Verdunville CDP includes the neighboring community of Shegon. As of the 2020 census, the total CDP population was 491 (down from 687 at the 2010 census).

The community's name commemorates the Battle of Verdun.

== Geography ==
Verdunville is in west-central Logan County, in the valley of the Mud Fork, an east-flowing tributary of Island Creek and part of the Guyandotte River watershed. Mud Fork Road runs up the valley from Mount Gay in the east (near Logan), through Verdunville and Shegon to the northwest, and leads eventually to Dingess in Mingo County. U.S. Route 119, a four-lane expressway, forms the eastern edge of the Verdunville CDP, with the closest access from an interchange with West Virginia Route 73 north of the Mud Fork valley.

According to the U.S. Census Bureau, the Verdunville CDP has a total area of 2.7 square miles (6.9 km^{2}), of which 1.1 acres (4,549 m^{2}), or 0.07%, are water.
