= Crystal Block, West Virginia =

Unincorporated community in West Virginia, United States

- Unincorporated community
- Location within West Virginia Location within the United States
- Coordinates: 37°42′28″N 81°59′18″W
- Country: United States
- State: West Virginia
- County: Logan
- Elevation: 1,017 ft (310 m)
- Time zone: UTC-5 (Eastern (EST))
  - Summer (DST): UTC-4 (EDT)
- Area codes: 304 & 681
- GNIS feature ID: 1554235

Crystal Block is an unincorporated community in Logan County, West Virginia, United States. Crystal Block is located along Island Creek and West Virginia Route 44, 9.7 miles (15.6 km) south of Logan. It is part of the Sarah Ann census-designated place.
