= Barnabus, West Virginia =

Unincorporated community in West Virginia, United States

- Unincorporated community
- Location within West Virginia Location within the United States
- Coordinates: 37°44′38″N 82°00′33″W
- Country: United States
- State: West Virginia
- County: Logan
- Elevation: 869 ft (265 m)
- Time zone: UTC-5 (Eastern (EST))
  - Summer (DST): UTC-4 (EDT)
- Area codes: 304 & 681
- GNIS feature ID: 1535254

Barnabus is an unincorporated community in Logan County, West Virginia, United States, along West Virginia Route 44 and Island Creek. Barnabus is 7.5 miles (12.1 km) south of Logan. Barnabus was named for one of its founding citizens, Barnabus Curry (b. 1789 d. 1869).
