= Kario Oquendo =

American basketball player (born 2000)

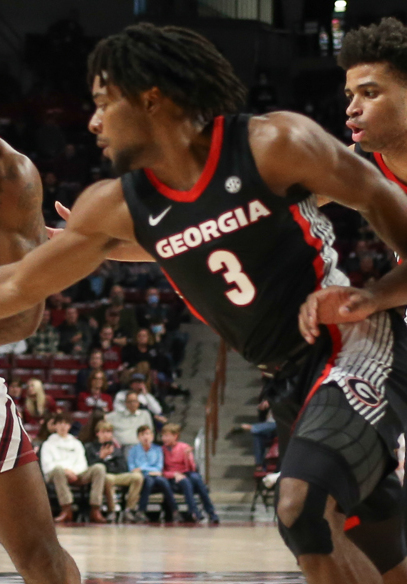
- Oquendo with Georgia in 2022

Free agent
- Position: Shooting guard

Personal information
- Born: January 28, 2000 (age 26) Titusville, Florida, U.S.
- Listed height: 6 ft 4 in (1.93 m)
- Listed weight: 215 lb (98 kg)

Career information
- High school: Astronaut (Titusville, Florida)
- College: Florida SouthWestern (2020–2021); Georgia (2021–2023); Oregon (2023–2024); SMU (2024–2025)
- NBA draft: 2025: undrafted
- Playing career: 2025–present

Career history
- 2025: Texas Legends
- 2026: PD Radnički

Career highlights
- First-team All-Southern (2021)

De'Kario Juanta Oquendo (born January 28, 2000) is an American basketball player who last played for KK SPD Radnički of the Basketball League of Serbia (KLS). He played college basketball for the Florida SouthWestern Buccaneers, Georgia Bulldogs, Oregon Ducks, and SMU Mustangs.

== High school career ==
Oquendo attended both Titusville High School and Astronaut High School in Titusville, Florida. As a junior, Oquendo averaged 21.2 points and 8.3 rebounds per game leading his team to a 20–6 record. He would forgo his senior season and enroll at Florida SouthWestern State College.

== College career ==
Oquendo earned significant playing time as a freshman, averaging 13.5 points and 3.8 rebounds per game. At the conclusion of the season, entered the transfer portal. On May 5, 2021, Oquendo announced that he was transferring to the University of Georgia, over offers from Oregon, Pittsburgh, and Marquette.

Oquendo made an instant impact with the Bulldogs, scoring 24 points in an 82–79 upset win over No. 18 Memphis. He recorded a then career-high 28 points in an 88–72 loss to Mississippi State, before setting a new career high with 33 points in a 91–77 loss to Texas A&M. Following the season, Oquendo entered the transfer portal but ultimately returned to Georgia for another season. As a junior, Oquendo averaged 12.7 points and 2.6 rebounds per game. On March 21, 2023, he announced that he would enter both the transfer portal and the 2023 NBA draft.

On April 21, 2023, Oquendo announced his transfer to the University of Oregon. In his lone season at Oregon, Oquendo appeared in 36 games, averaging 7.2 points, 2.4 rebounds and one assist per game. Following the season, he entered the transfer portal for the third time.

On April 19, 2024, Oquendo announced his decision to transfer to Southern Methodist University to play for the SMU Mustangs.

== Professional career ==
Oquendo went undrafted in the 2025 NBA draft. He was selected with the 11th pick in the 2025 NBA G League draft by the Texas Legends. Oquendo appeared in eight games for the Legends, averaging 3.5 points and 1.5 assists per game before being waived on December 4, 2025.

On January 21, 2026, Oquendo signed with KK SPD Radnički of the Basketball League of Serbia (KLS).

== Career statistics ==
Legend
GP	Games played	GS	Games started	MPG	Minutes per game
FG%	Field goal percentage	3P%	3-point field goal percentage	FT%	Free throw percentage
RPG	Rebounds per game	APG	Assists per game	SPG	Steals per game
BPG	Blocks per game	PPG	Points per game	**Bold**	Career high

=== College ===
Year	Team	GP	GS	MPG	FG%	3P%	FT%	RPG	APG	SPG	BPG	PPG
2020–21	Florida SouthWestern	23	10	22.2	.554	.403	.696	3.8	1.3	.7	.5	13.5
2021–22	Georgia	31	**31**	**29.5**	.453	.272	.712	**4.3**	.8	**1.2**	**.5**	**15.2**
2022–23	Georgia	29	28	25.4	.392	.267	.747	2.6	.6	.5	.3	12.7
2023–24	Oregon	**36**	3	17.7	**.459**	.333	.660	2.4	**1.0**	.3	.3	7.2
2024–25	SMU	35	12	23.5	.494	**.423**	**.814**	3.3	**1.0**	.9	.3	11.2
