= Don Chafin =

American politician

- Born: June 26, 1887; Kermit, West Virginia, U.S.
- Died: August 9, 1954 (aged 67); Huntington, West Virginia, U.S.
- Known for: Sheriff of Logan County, West Virginia (1912–1924); Commander in the Battle of Blair Mountain
- Spouse: Mary Mounts (m. 1905)
- Children: 10

Don Chafin (June 26, 1887 – August 9, 1954) was an American sheriff and a commander in the Battle of Blair Mountain. As sheriff of Logan County, West Virginia, Chafin was a fierce opponent of unionization and received hundreds of thousands of dollars from coal mine operators in bribes for his violent suppression of the United Mine Workers union.

Chafin's most notable anti-union measures came during the 1921 Battle of Blair Mountain, when he organized an effort to prevent armed miners from crossing through Logan County. He assembled a force of thousands of local townspeople, sheriff's deputies, and national guardsmen. His forces successfully prevented the advance of the miners until federal troops intervened and forced the latter to disperse. As a result of his actions, Chafin became a hero of the mine operators and an enemy of the miners.

In 1924, Chafin was arrested in connection with moonshining and sentenced to two years in federal prison, of which he served 10 months. While in prison, he lost much of his influence in Logan County. After his release, however, Chafin managed to regain some power in the Democratic Party of West Virginia, becoming a lobbyist for the coal industry. In 1936, he moved to Huntington, West Virginia, where he was a wealthy and well-known figure until his death in 1954.

== Early life ==
Chafin was born on June 26, 1887, near the town of Kermit in present-day Mingo County, West Virginia, the sixth of eleven children. His father, Francis Marion Chafin, was the sheriff of Logan County, and Chafin grew up in the town of Logan. (He was related to the Hatfield family of West Virginia—his great-aunt Levisa "Levicy" Chafin was the wife of Anderson Hatfield). For two years he studied in the preparatory department of Marshall College – without taking college courses – but did not graduate. He also attended the Mountain State Business College, before teaching at the Dingress School in Mingo County.

In 1905, Chafin married Mary Mounts, with whom he eventually had 10 children, eight of whom survived to adulthood. Three years later, in 1908, Chafin was appointed the tax assessor of Logan County. In 1912, Chafin was elected sheriff of Logan County for the first time, and in 1920 he was elected county clerk as well.

== As sheriff ==
After becoming sheriff of Logan County, Chafin became known as "the boss" of Logan County or "the czar", and its "best known citizen". His authority extended so far into every aspect of public life that he reportedly controlled every judge and jury in the county. According to Howard B. Lee, the former Attorney General of West Virginia, Chafin was so powerful that "no schoolteacher was employed without his approval."

Chafin's vast power attracted the attention of mine operators, who paid him to keep the unions out of Logan County. The operators bribed Chafin with large payments, and paid many of the expenses of the sheriff's department. While the exact payments to Chafin are unknown, a special commission ordered by Governor John Cornwell found that he received a payment of at least $32,700 per year in return for keeping the union out of Logan County. Other estimates of the bribes paid to Chafin range as high as $61,571 in 1921, and other evidence suggests the possibility of even higher figures. The historian Robert Shogan reports that although Chafin's annual salary was only $3,500 per year, his net worth by 1921 was in excess of $350,000, suggesting that he received bribes of at least $50,000 annually.

The operators also directly paid the salary of at least forty of Chafin's deputies, ensuring control over the department and favorable treatment. The bribes from the mine owners did indeed result in favors from Chafin; Chafin stationed one of his deputies at every railway station in Logan County to "guard against union organizers". Upon suspicion that someone entering the county was a union organizer, Chafin's deputies would either force him to leave, arrest him, or beat him. In one case, Chafin mistook J. L. Heiser, the Chief Clerk of the West Virginia Department of Mines, for a union organizer, then threatened him with a gun, hit him over the head with a blackjack, and forced him to leave the county. After the incident, realizing his mistake, Chafin paid Heiser $1,000 in compensation, but never faced any other consequences for his actions.

=== Shooting ===
Chafin's anti-union activities did successfully keep the United Mine Workers out of Logan County, but they also aroused the anger of UMW officials. Chafin also established a record of violent and unpleasant confrontations with union officials outside of Logan County. In one such incident in September 1919, Chafin entered the office of the UMW in Charleston, West Virginia, while he was "drunk, armed and very belligerent." William Petry, the vice-president of the local union, asked Chafin to leave, but Chafin responded by brandishing a revolver. Petry then shot Chafin in the chest with a 22-caliber pistol. Petry was later cleared of criminal wrongdoing on the grounds that his action was self-defense, but he expressed no remorse about the shooting and later remarked "That's what happens when a man carries a toy pistol. That goddamned son of a bitch is liable to get well. I should have had my old 'forty-four.'" In a second shooting incident, a miner walked into Chafin's sheriff office in Logan and, without a word, shot him in the chest. Chafin walked the two blocks to Logan General Hospital with a bullet lodged in his chest two inches from his heart. In a third incident, a disgruntled constituent walked into his office, with a gun drawn and reportedly said "Don Chafin, I'm gonna' shoot you dead." Chafin reached into his desk drawer and pulled out a pistol of his own, and said, "Go ahead. We'll hop into Hell together." The man left without firing a shot.

== Battle of Blair Mountain ==
Chafin's conflict with the unions became most pronounced during the Battle of Blair Mountain in August and September 1921. A strike, with its beginning in 1920, had led to increasing violence throughout southern West Virginia, including the Battle of Matewan. The growing violence led to a declaration of martial law in 1921, and a Congressional investigation into the circumstances in the area began, but it accomplished little. Then Sid Hatfield, the miners' hero from the Battle of Matewan, was killed on August 1 by Baldwin-Felts agents on the steps of the McDowell County Courthouse in Welch. After his murder and funeral, tensions erupted in southern West Virginia.

=== Miners assemble ===
Shortly after Hatfield's death, a large group of miners began to assemble south of Charleston along Lens Creek, and prepared to march south to Mingo County, and free their fellow miners who had been imprisoned under the martial law decree for violent acts. The path of the march would take the miners directly across Logan County, causing fear for Chafin and his backers. Chafin declared "No armed mob will cross Logan County", and prepared to stop the miners as they crossed Blair Mountain. Chafin's pronouncements and preparations were regarded with contempt by the miners, who took up the cry, "We'll hang Don Chafin to a sour apple tree." One of the leaders of the miners, Ed Reynolds, later testified that a central aim of the march was "to kill Sheriff Don Chafin".

Faced with the oncoming miner army, Chafin put into place plans he had been forming since early summer. Chafin had formed a small army of several hundred volunteers, composed of his deputies, mine guards, and members of the Logan County middle class, and had begun to train them in June. He established large weapons caches, including a stockpile of machine guns, and erected breastworks on the slopes of Blair Mountain. At around 2 a.m. on August 25, Chafin turned on the fire siren in the town of Logan, calling together his army. By morning, 700 members of his volunteer army were assembled on the slopes of Blair Mountain. In addition to his land forces, Chafin established a small air force, composed of three biplanes that he rented from private owners for use in reconnaissance.

After initial skirmishes on August 25 and August 26 between Chafin's forces and the miners, UMW officials managed to defuse the tensions in the area, and convinced the miners to go home. Chafin recalled his troops and told them "You have been in defense of our rights. Logan County will never forget it." Before the miners dispersed, however, the West Virginia State Police attempted to arrest a group of their leaders, and the attempt escalated into a shootout in which several miners died. Suddenly the rebellion reignited, and it became clear that a major battle was coming.

=== Battle ===
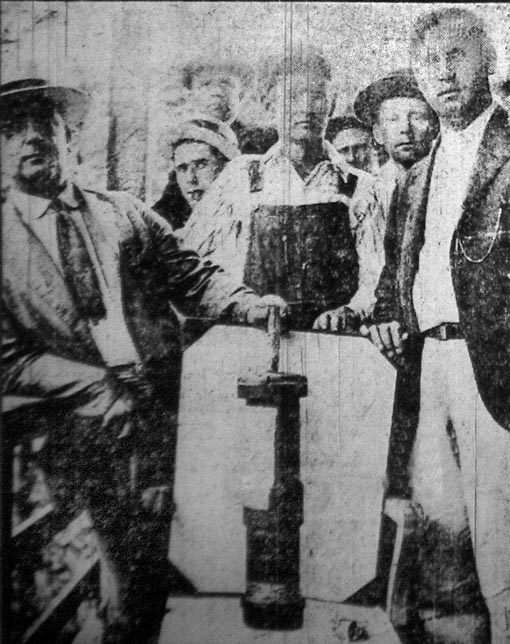
Members of the UMW display a bomb dropped by Chafin's biplanes

Chafin reorganized and enlarged his forces, and volunteers from around the state arrived to join his army. The Governor of West Virginia, Ephraim Morgan, also helped Chafin recruit men to join his forces, and sent an unofficial national guard unit to join him. Governor Morgan then named William Eubanks as a colonel of the National Guard, and ordered him to take command of the forces from Chafin. Chafin officially passed command to Eubanks, but "the army remained Chafin's in popular perception."

As it became clear that battle was imminent, and Chafin printed leaflets for his biplanes to drop on the miners, ordering them one last time to disperse. The effort produced no results, and both sides prepared for the conflict. Not long after the leaflets were dropped, the battle "erupted in hot warfare." Chafin served as Eubanks's second in command, and helped organize forces. The next day, September 1, as the fighting intensified, Chafin left the front lines to establish a second line of defense around the town of Logan in case the miners broke through the first line. That same day, Chafin also equipped his biplanes with pipe bombs and tear gas, which they dropped on the miners, though they inflicted no serious casualties.

=== Aftermath ===
The next day, September 2, the battle ended when federal troops under General Harry Hill Bandholtz arrived. Chafin and his army went home, and Chafin became "a hero in the eyes of the coal operators" for his role in stopping the march. While the operators regarded Chafin as a hero, the miners placed the blame for the bloodshed on Chafin.

Regardless of his role in the events, Chafin remained sheriff after the battle and began to round up and arrest a number of the leaders of the miners. While some of the top leaders arranged to be arrested in other jurisdictions to stay out of Chafin's hand, others including Frank Keeney, a top UMW official, and Bill Blizzard, the so-called general of the miners, surrendered to Chafin and were put in jail in Logan County. The trials eventually were transferred to other jurisdictions, and the prisoners passed out of Chafin's hands without incident.

== Politics and arrest ==
After the battle, Chafin went back to his normal work as sheriff of Logan County and "became more arrogant", believing his position to be unassailable. He became involved in a number of illegal ventures, including a moonshining operation. He also became increasingly important within the West Virginia Democratic party, due to his celebrity status after the battle. He was frequently present in the state capitol, and attended the 1924 Democratic National Convention as a member of the West Virginia delegation.

A few months later, Chafin's illegal activities led to his arrest. One of his deputies, Tennis Hatfield, was arrested for violating the Volstead Act, and he implicated Chafin at his trial. Chafin was tried and convicted of violation of the Volstead Act at the federal courthouse in Huntington, West Virginia, on October 14, 1924. He was given the maximum sentence of two years in prison, and ordered to pay a fine of $10,000. The judge in the case took special precautions to protect the witnesses against Chafin, due to his potentially violent nature. Chafin appealed the verdict, but it was upheld in April 1925, and he was sent to the federal penitentiary in Atlanta. He served 10 months of his sentence before being paroled back to Logan County in August 1926. While Chafin was in prison, he lost much of his influence in Logan County, and his political opponents took power. Following his parole, he moved to Charleston and retained some of his influence in the Democratic Party of West Virginia while lobbying for the coal industry.

== Later life ==
In 1936, Chafin moved to Huntington, where he purchased a number of properties including the Guaranty Bank, on top of which he built a penthouse as his home. He lived in semi-retirement there for the rest of his life.

In his later days, Chafin trained coon dogs, and was known as "one of Huntington's wealthiest men" and a "familiar figure" in the city. He suffered several heart attacks in his later life, and eventually died on August 9, 1954, in a Huntington hospital after a surgical procedure.

== Legacy ==
His house at Logan, known as the Chafin House, served as the Logan Public Library for many years and was listed on the National Register of Historic Places in 1994.

== See also ==
- List of worker deaths in United States labor disputes
