= West Virginia Route 73 =

State highway in West Virginia, United States

West Virginia Route 73

Route information
- Maintained by WVDOH
- Length: 2.4 mi (3.9 km)

Major junctions
- West end: US 119 near Verdunville
- WV 44 / CR 18 at Mount Gay
- East end: WV 10 in Logan

Location
- Country: United States
- State: West Virginia
- Counties: Logan

Highway system
- West Virginia State Highway System; Interstate; US; State
← WV 72	→ WV 74

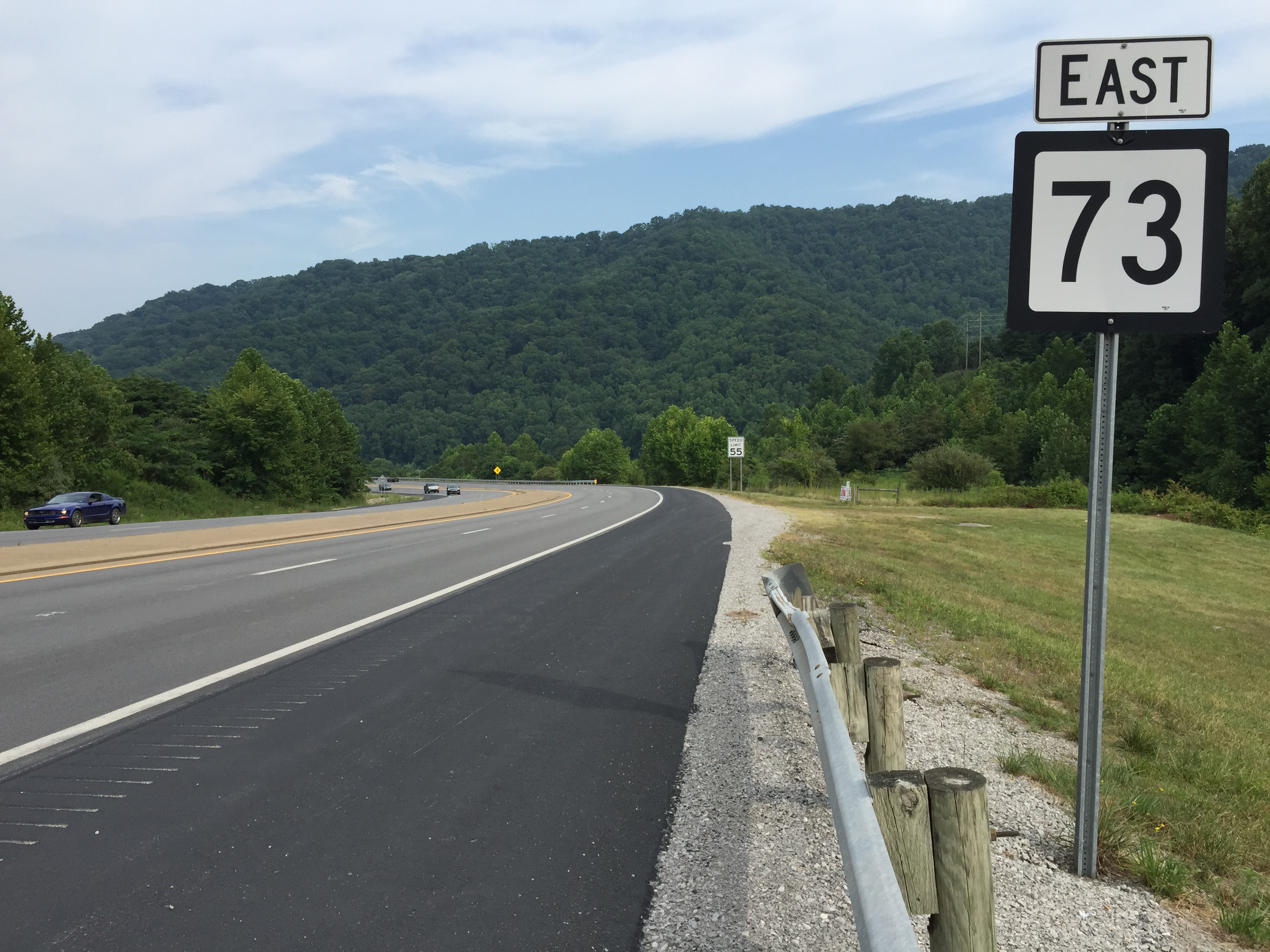
View east along WV 73 east of US 119 in Mount Gay-Shamrock

West Virginia Route 73 is an east–west state highway located in the Logan, West Virginia area. The western terminus of the route is at an interchange with U.S. Route 119 a half-mile north of Verdunville and three miles (5 km) west of Logan. The eastern terminus is at West Virginia Route 10 outside Logan.

WV 73 intersects the northern terminus of West Virginia Route 44 a half-mile west of WV 10.

== Major intersections ==
The entire route is in Logan County.

Location	mi	km	Destinations	Notes
			US 119 – Williamson, Charleston	interchange
Mount Gay			WV 44 south / CR 18 (Holden Road) to US 119	
			WV 10 – Man, Pineville	
1.000 mi = 1.609 km; 1.000 km = 0.621 mi
