= Jack Wilson (basketball) =

American basketball coach

Jack L. Wilson
Biographical details
- Born: August 27, 1936; Omar, West Virginia
- Died: June 6, 1988 (aged 51); Clearwater, Florida
- Education: Anderson University (Indiana)

Coaching career (HC unless noted)
- 1958–1962: Zephyrhills High School
- 1962–1966: Madison Heights High School
- 1966–1968: Titusville High School
- 1968–1985: Clearwater High School

Head coaching record
- Overall: 585–179

Accomplishments and honors

Championships
- Zephyrhills High School, Florida state (1962); Clearwater High School, Florida state (1981)

Awards
- "Florida Coach of the Year" (twice) "Hall of Fame", Florida High School Athletic Association (1994) "Athletic Hall of Fame", Anderson University (2001)

Jack Lawrence Wilson (August 27, 1936 – June 6, 1988), was an American college basketball player and two-time Florida state championship high school basketball coach. He played for the Anderson University (Indiana) "Ravens" from 1955 to 1958, setting a number of school records. As a high school basketball coach for 27 years, Wilson's teams achieved an overall record of 585–179, twice winning state championships.

== High school and college years ==
Born in Omar, West Virginia, Wilson was a high school basketball star, averaging 25 points scored per game. He was the leading scorer in the Kentucky/West Virginia High School All-Star game and was also named All-State center.

In college, he played for the Anderson University (Indiana) "Ravens" from 1955 to 1958 where he set six school records that still stand today – more than any other Raven basketball player. During his college career, Wilson scored a total of 1,992 points. He earned All-Conference three times (1956–1958) and was MVP in 1956 and again in 1957. He was only the third AU athlete to be inducted posthumously into its "Athletic Hall of Fame" in 2001.

== Coaching career ==
Wilson began his 27-year high school basketball coaching career in Florida at Zephyrhills High School (1958) where he won his first state title. He then moved on in 1962 to Madison Heights High School located in Anderson, Indiana. In the fall of 1967, he returned to Florida to coach at Titusville High School. Two years later, Wilson accepted the head coaching position at Clearwater High School, where he remained until his coaching retirement in 1985. During his tenure at Clearwater High, his team compiled a 508–99 record, for an .837 winning percentage.

Wilson amassed a record over his entire 27 year coaching career of 585–179, along with winning two state championships: the first at Zephyrhills High School in 1962 and the second at Clearwater High School in 1981. His 1981 championship team at Clearwater High School had a 32–3 winning record, with future NBA player Mike Brittain at center. In addition, his teams had one runner-up finish, six regional titles, 13 district titles, and 17 conference titles. He was named Florida Coach of the Year twice and was inducted into the Florida High School Athletic Association (FHSAA) Hall of Fame in 1994.

Wilson received national attention when he was awarded the Southeastern District Coach of the Year and was one of eight finalists for national coach of the year honors on June 25, 1982, in Indianapolis.

The Jack L. Wilson Gymnasium was named in his honor at Clearwater High School. It is well known as the "House that Jack Built".

== Death ==
Wilson suffered heart failure in the early morning hours of June 6, 1988, at his home in Clearwater. He was rushed to Mease Countryside Hospital, where emergency resuscitation efforts failed and he was pronounced dead at 5:00 am EST.
