= Island Creek (West Virginia) =

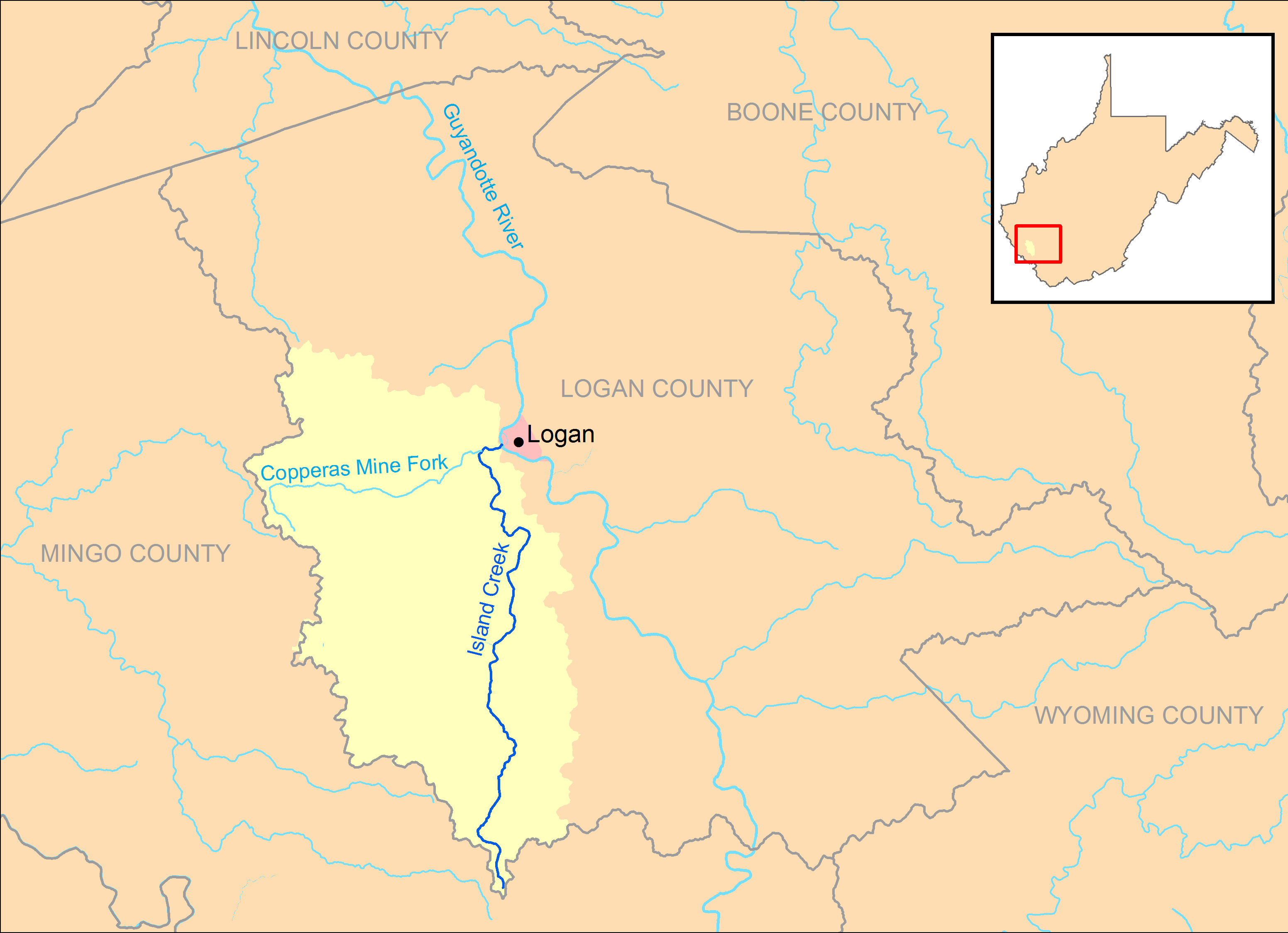
- Island Creek and its watershed in Logan County, West Virginia

Location
- Country: United States
- State: West Virginia
- County: Logan

Physical characteristics
- Source
  - location: Horsepen Mountain, near Mountain View
  - coordinates: 37.6456631°N 81.9934561°W
  - elevation: 1,837 ft (560 m)
- Mouth: Guyandotte River
  - location: Logan
  - coordinates: 37.8487146°N 81.9970693°W
  - elevation: 663 ft (202 m)
- Length: 18.1 mi (29.1 km)
- Basin size: 105 sq mi (270 km^{2})

Basin features
- Tributaries
  - left: Copperas Mine Fork

Island Creek is a tributary of the Guyandotte River, 18.1 miles (29.1 km) long, in southern West Virginia in the United States. Via the Guyandotte and Ohio rivers, it is part of the watershed of the Mississippi River, draining an area of 105 square miles (270 km^{2}) in a rural area on the unglaciated portion of the Allegheny Plateau, in the Logan Coalfield. Island Creek's entire course and drainage area are in Logan County.

Island Creek rises on Horsepen Mountain in the southern extremity of Logan County, near the community of Mountain View, and flows generally northward through the unincorporated communities of Crystal Block, Sarah Ann, Stirrat, Barnabus, Superior Bottom, Omar, Chauncey, Micco, Switzer, Rossmore, Monaville, Wilkinson, Monitor, and Mount Gay, to the city of Logan, where it flows into the Guyandotte River opposite Hatfield Island. The creek is paralleled by West Virginia Route 44 for most of its course.

According to the West Virginia Department of Environmental Protection, approximately 94% of the Island Creek watershed is forested, mostly deciduous. Its largest tributary is the Copperas Mine Fork, which drains 43% of Island Creek's watershed; Copperas Mine Fork flows into Island Creek at Mount Gay.

== See also ==
- List of rivers of West Virginia
