= Rossmore, West Virginia =

- Census-designated place
- Location within West Virginia Location within the United States
- Coordinates: 37°48′33″N 81°58′52″W
- Country: United States
- State: West Virginia
- County: Logan

Area
  - Total: 0.629 sq mi (1.63 km^{2})
  - Land: 0.623 sq mi (1.61 km^{2})
  - Water: 0.006 sq mi (0.016 km^{2})
- Elevation: 728 ft (222 m)

Population (2020)
  - Total: 241
  - Density: 387/sq mi (149/km^{2})
- Time zone: UTC-5 (Eastern (EST))
  - Summer (DST): UTC-4 (EDT)
- ZIP Code: 25601
- Area codes: 304 & 681
- GNIS feature ID: 1546096
- FIPS code: 54-70468

Rossmore is an unincorporated community and census-designated place (CDP) in Logan County, West Virginia, United States, along West Virginia Route 44 and Island Creek. Its population was 241 at the 2020 census (down from 301 at the 2010 census).

== Geography ==
Rossmore is in central Logan County and is bordered to the north by Monaville and to the south by Switzer. WV-44, following Island Creek, leads north (downstream) 5 miles (8 km) to Logan, the county seat, and south 13 miles (21 km) to U.S. Route 52 at the headwaters of the creek.

According to the U.S. Census Bureau, the Rossmore CDP has a total area of 0.6 square miles (1.6 km^{2}), of which 0.01 square miles (0.02 km^{2}), or 0.96%, are water.
