= Astronaut High School =

Public high school in Titusville, Florida, United States

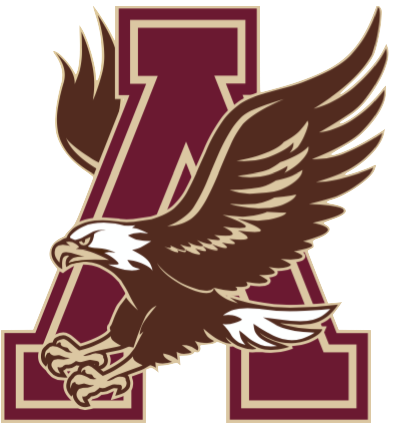

Location
- 800 War Eagle Boulevard; Titusville, Florida 32796; United States; 28°37′30″N 80°51′4″W

Information
- Type: Public
- Motto: Pride in community, passion in learning
- Established: 1972
- School district: Brevard County School District
- Principal: Krista Miller
- Teaching staff: 49.00 (FTE)
- Grades: 9–12
- Enrollment: 1,056 (2024–2025)
- Student to teacher ratio: 21.55
- Colors: Maroon and Gold
- Fight song: "You've Said it All"
- Nickname: War Eagles
- Rival: Titusville High School
- Website: https://www.brevardschools.org/AstronautHS

Astronaut High School is located in Brevard County, in the city of Titusville, Florida, United States. It is part of the Brevard County School District. The school's name comes from its location, near the Kennedy Space Center. The school was built in 1972. The school's motto is "pride in community, passion in learning". The current principal is Krista Miller.

== Academics ==
Astronaut High School has two academies within the school. The Health Sciences Academy offers courses for students who are interested in the medical field after graduations. Students within this academy also have the opportunity to test to become Certified Nursing Assistant (CNA). The Fine Arts Academy is an academy offered to students who are interested in the fine arts such as music and theater. Astronaut High School also offers AVID which offers students college preparatory courses to ensure enrollment to a four-year college. The school also offers dual enrollment courses through Eastern Florida State College where students can become eligible to complete their Associate of the Arts degree at the time of graduation.

The library was recognized as one of the top ten in the state in 2010.

== Athletics ==
Its primary sports rival is Titusville High School.

=== State champion teams ===
- Girls' Basketball Champions (Class 4A) in 2006 and 2009
- Boys' Track and Field State Champions 1976 (Class 3A) and 2000 (Class 2A)
- Boys' Cross Country State Champions 1978, 1979 and 1980 (Class 3A)
- Boys' Tennis State Champions 1990, 1992 and 1994 (Class 3A)
- Wrestling State Champions 1999 (Class 4A)
- Girls' Cross Country State Champions 1979, 1980, 1981, 1983, 1984 and 1985 (Class 3A)
- Girls' Volleyball State Champions (Class 3A) 1980
- Girls' Track and Field State Champions (Class 3A) 1979*
- Girls Softball State Champions (class 3A)

== Notable alumni ==
- John Bostic - Class of 1980; professional football player
- Cris Collinsworth - Class of 1977; professional football player
- J.T. Hassell - Class of 2014; professional football player
- Javian Hawkins - Transferred; professional football player
- Wilber Marshall - Class of 1980; professional football player
- Anil Menon - NASA Astronaut Group 23
- Kario Oquendo - Class of 2020; college basketball player
- Daniel Tosh - Class of 1993; stand-up comedian
- Aaron Walker - Class of 1998; professional football player

== Notable faculty ==
- Elijah Williams - former professional football player and college football coach
