= J. T. Hassell =

American gridiron football player (born 1995)

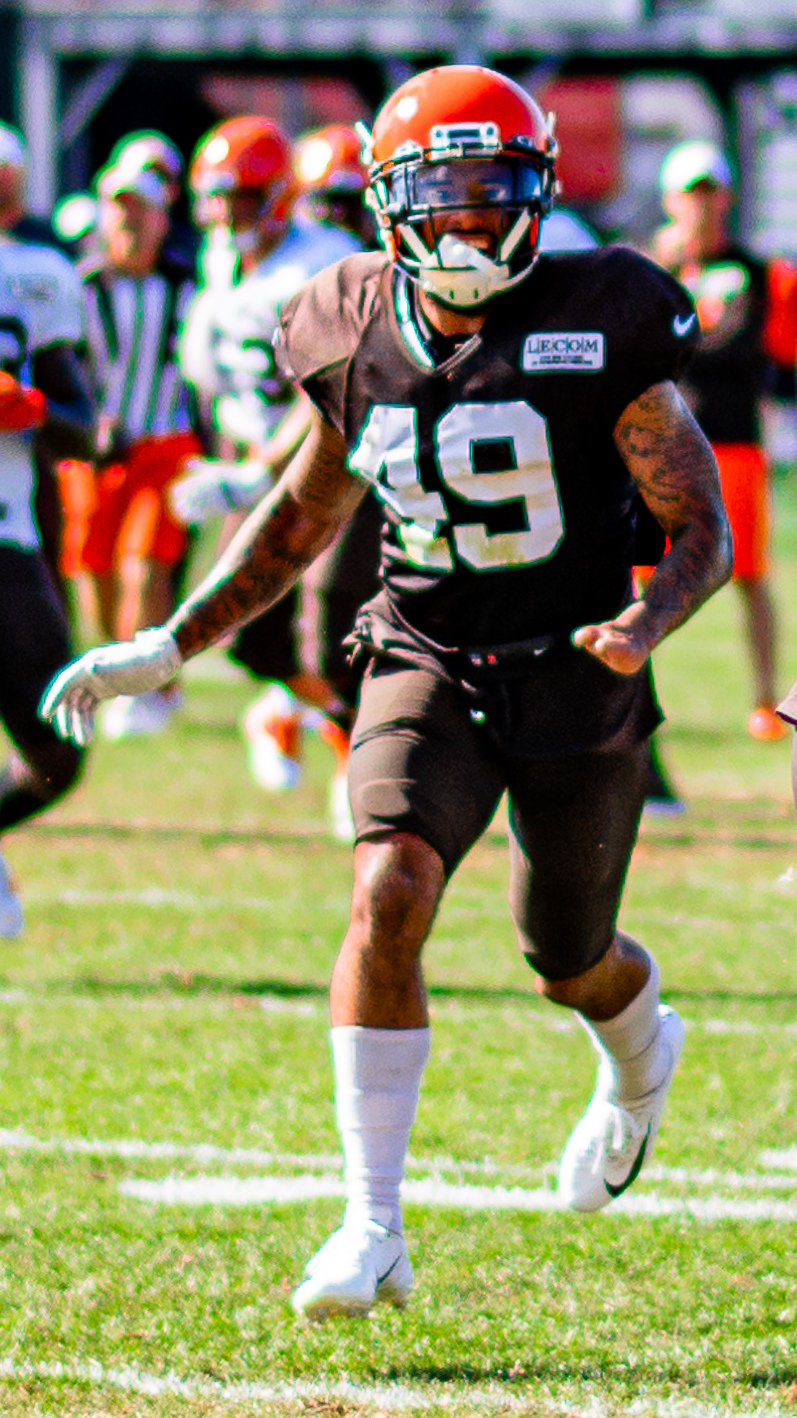
- Hassel with the Cleveland Browns in 2019

Profile
- Position: Defensive back

Personal information
- Born: August 14, 1995 (age 31); Titusville, Florida, U.S.
- Listed height: 5 ft 11 in (1.80 m)
- Listed weight: 200 lb (91 kg)

Career information
- High school: Astronaut (Titusville, Florida)
- College: Florida Tech
- NFL draft: 2019: undrafted

Career history
- Cleveland Browns (2019); New England Patriots (2020)*; New York Jets (2020); Winnipeg Blue Bombers (2022); Toronto Argonauts (2023)*
- * Offseason or practice squad member only

Awards and highlights
- GSC Defensive Player of the Year (2018); Division II All-American (2018); First-team All-GSC (2018); Second-team All-GSC (2017)

Career NFL statistics
- Total tackles: 8
- Stats at Pro Football Reference
- Stats at CFL.ca

Justin Tyler "J. T." Hassell (born August 14, 1995) is an American professional football defensive back. Hassell played college football at Florida Tech. He has been a member of the Cleveland Browns, New England Patriots, New York Jets, Winnipeg Blue Bombers, and Toronto Argonauts

== Early life ==
Hassell was born with only two fingers on his left hand due to a deformity. He grew up in Titusville, Florida and attended Titusville High School before transferring to Astronaut High School.

== College career ==
Hassell began his collegiate career at South Dakota State. He started all 14 of the Jackrabbits games at linebacker as a true freshman and recorded 41 tackles, four tackles for loss, a sack and an interception. Hassell played in 12 games as a sophomore with 21 tackles. Following the end of the season, he decided to transfer to the Division II Florida Institute of Technology in order to be closer to his family.

After sitting out a year due to NCAA transfer rules, Hassell led the Panthers and finished fifth in the Gulf South Conference (GSC) with 78 tackles and was named second-team all-conference as a redshirt junior. As a redshirt senior, he made 124 tackles, 9.5 tackles for loss, 4.5 sacks for 34 yards and three forced fumbles and was named first-team All-GSC and the conference Defensive Player of the Year, as well as a first-team All-American by the American Football Coaches Association and the D2CCA, and a second-team All-American by the Associated Press.

== Professional career ==
=== Cleveland Browns ===
Hassell signed with the Cleveland Browns as an undrafted free agent on May 3, 2019. He was waived at the end of final roster cuts, but was re-signed to the Browns' practice squad on September 1, 2019. Hassell was promoted to the Browns' active roster on November 20, 2019. He made his NFL debut on November 24, 2019, against the Miami Dolphins, playing nine snaps on special teams and making two tackles in a 41–24 win while also becoming the first Florida Tech player to appear in an NFL regular season game. In his rookie season Hassell played in four games with seven tackles.

Hassell was waived by the Browns on September 3, 2020.

=== New England Patriots ===
On November 30, 2020, Hassell was signed to the New England Patriots practice squad. He was released on December 8.

=== New York Jets ===
On December 11, 2020, Hassell was signed to the New York Jets' active roster. Against the Los Angeles Rams on December 20, 2020, he blocked a punt in the second quarter of the game. On August 31, 2021, Hassell was waived by the Jets.

=== Winnipeg Blue Bombers ===
Hasell signed with the Winnipeg Blue Bombers in the Canadian Football League (CFL) on September 6, 2022. He was released by the team on October 12, 2022. Hasell played in four games, recording two special teams tackles.

=== Toronto Argonauts ===
On January 4, 2023, it was announced that Hassell had been signed by the Toronto Argonauts. He was moved to the practice roster on June 3, and placed on the reserve/suspended list on July 24, 2023.
