= Omar, West Virginia =

- Census-designated place
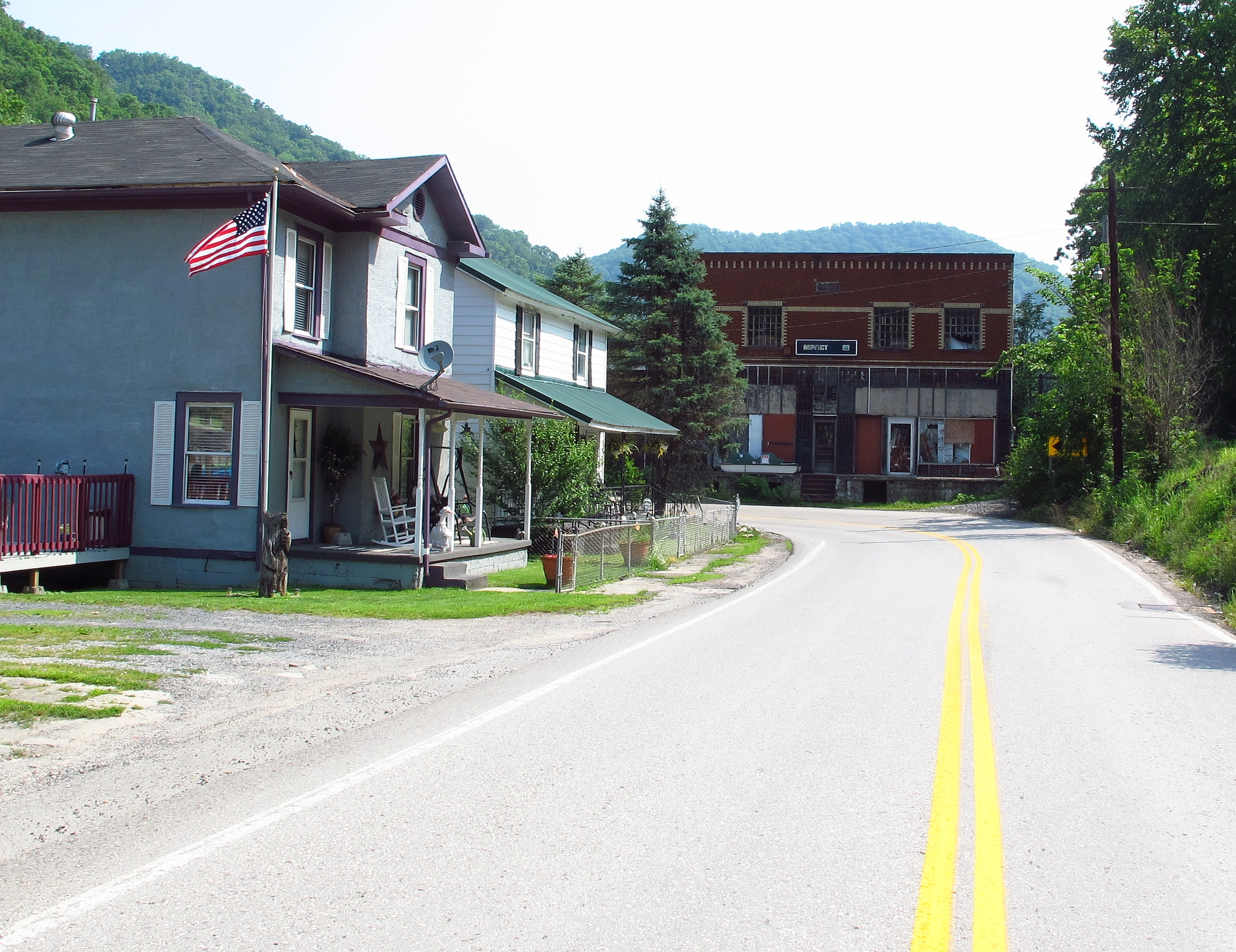
- Omar

- Location within West Virginia Location within the United States
- Coordinates: 37°45′20″N 81°59′58″W
- Country: United States
- State: West Virginia
- County: Logan

Area
  - Total: 1.140 sq mi (2.95 km^{2})
  - Land: 1.125 sq mi (2.91 km^{2})
  - Water: 0.015 sq mi (0.039 km^{2})
- Elevation: 814 ft (248 m)

Population (2020)
  - Total: 416
  - Density: 370/sq mi (143/km^{2})
- Time zone: UTC-5 (Eastern (EST))
  - Summer (DST): UTC-4 (EDT)
- ZIP code: 25638
- Area codes: 304 & 681
- GNIS feature ID: 1544403
- FIPS code: 54-60628

Omar is an unincorporated community and census-designated place (CDP) in Logan County, West Virginia, United States. Omar is located along West Virginia Route 44 and Island Creek, 6.5 miles (10.5 km) south of Logan. Omar has a post office with ZIP code 25638. As of the 2020 census, its population was 416 (down from 552 at the 2010 census). According to the 2020 census the median income is $64,390 USD.

The community was named after James Omar Cole, one of the original lessors.

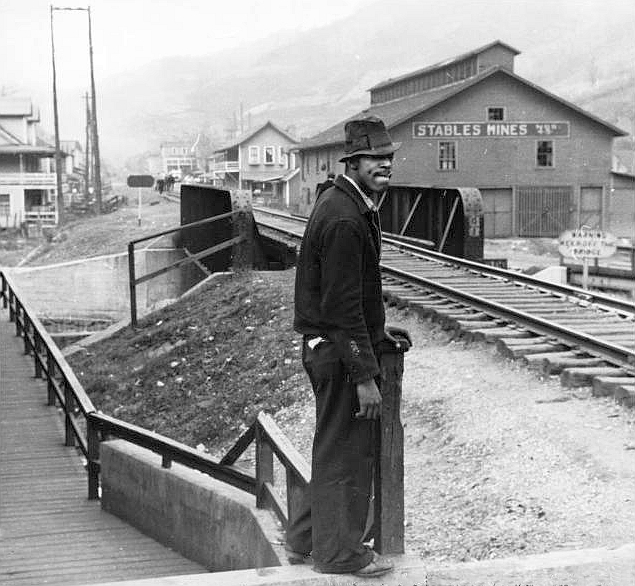
Omar in 1935
