= Mamie Thurman =

American murder victim (1900–1932)

Mamie Thurman (1900–1932) was an American woman whose slain body was found and recovered on 22 Mine Road near Holden, West Virginia on June 22, 1932. The site is about 7 miles from Logan, West Virginia. She was born in Louisville, Kentucky in 1900.

== Biography ==
Born Mamie Morrison, in Kentucky September 12, 1900 to George A. Morrison and Ollie (who died when Mamie was 4 months old). In 1924 Mamie and her husband, Jack Thurman moved from Bradfordsville, Kentucky to Logan County, West Virginia, where Jack was hired as a patrolman with the local police department. Jack and Mamie rented a small two-room apartment over a garage, located in the backyard of Harry and Louise Robertson's home. Robertson worked for the National Bank of Logan, and served as treasurer of the Logan Public Library. Jack worked nights, and was under the impression his wife did not venture out after dark, this was not the case. Despite the fact that the 31 year old Mamie was known as a good wife, a saintly woman, and a faithful church worker at Nighbert Memorial Church, she also frequented the local clubs and speakeasies, where she was known for her popularity and friendly disposition. Mrs. Thurman was also allegedly having an ongoing relationship with Harry Robertson and more than a dozen other powerful men in the county.

== Death and trial ==
According to medical authorities at the time, Mamie Thurman's death resulted from her throat being slashed from ear to ear, after which she was shot twice in the left side of the head. The body was found in a patch of blackberries by a local boy, who then called the authorities. Found alongside the body were one shoe, a diamond engagement ring, and a silver wedding band, which ruled out robbery as the motive for her death. The other shoe and her purse, which contained $9 in change, cigarettes, and a wristwatch, were found 30 feet away the next day. Morticians would later uncover bloody rags and a razor in the home of her landlord Harry Robertson (the same house co-defendant Charles Stephenson lived in as the Robertsons' handyman). The manner and brutality of her murder was a shock to the citizens of the small, quiet towns in southern West Virginia. The arrest and eventual conviction of a handyman raised many questions in Logan, as the investigation involved several prominent citizens. The trial was standing room only, and many spectators brought their own chairs and basket lunches to court.

== Conspiracy ==
Mamie Thurman's death certificate filed at the courthouse states she was buried at Logan Memorial Park in McConnell, West Virginia. Other records show that her body was transported to Bradfordsville, Kentucky. It remains a mystery to this day just where Mamie Thurman was buried and if the man convicted in her death was actually her murderer.

== Theatrical production ==
In mid-2014, a play explaining the life, death, and trial regarding Mamie Thurman was in the works. The writer, Joyce Robertson, who was able to read through all the court documents in the case, finished the script in 2014. The play, Mamie, focuses on the last few months of Mamie's life, especially centered around her time of death.

Auditions were held on March 26, 27, and 29, 2015 in Logan High School's Little Theater. The original production ran from June 19 to July 3, 2015. It was written for a cast involving more than 40 people; the first showing was held at the Liz Spurlock Amphitheater in the historic Chief Logan State Park in Logan, West Virginia.

"Mamie" was produced by The Aracoma Story, Inc., again in the fall of 2019 in Logan, West Virginia, in the historic Coalfield Jamboree Theater.

== Notes ==
- Davis, Keith (2007). The Secret Life and Brutal Death of Mamie Thurman. Charleston, W. Va.: Quarrier Press. ISBN 978-1-891852-54-1. OCLC 54435678.
