= Joe DeForest =

American football player and coach (born 1965)

NC State Wolfpack
- Title: Safeties coach

Personal information
- Born: April 17, 1965 (age 61); Teaneck, New Jersey, U.S.
- Listed height: 6 ft 1 in (1.85 m)
- Listed weight: 240 lb (109 kg)

Career information
- High school: Titusville
- College: Southwest Louisiana
- NFL draft: 1987: undrafted

Career history

Playing
- Houston Oilers (1987)*; New Orleans Saints (1987); Calgary Stampeders (1988)
- * Offseason or practice squad member only

Coaching
- Titusville HS (FL) (assistant) (1988–1990); Rice (GA/RB) (1990–1991); Rice (OLB) (1992–1993); Duke (LB/ST) (1994–2000); Oklahoma State (DB/ST) (2001–2004); Oklahoma State (assoc. HC / S / ST) (2005–2011); West Virginia (assoc. HC / DC / S) (2012); West Virginia (S/ST) (2013–2015); Kansas (ST) (2016–2017); USC (defensive analyst) (2018); USC (OLB) (2019); NC State (S) (2020–2024)

Career NFL statistics
- Sacks: 1
- Stats at Pro Football Reference

Joseph John DeForest (born April 17, 1965) is a retired American football coach and former player. He most recently served as the safeties coach at the North Carolina State University (NC State). DeForest played college football at the University of Southwestern Louisiana—now known as University of Louisiana at Lafayette.

== Early life and playing career ==
DeForest was born in Teaneck, New Jersey, and grew up in Titusville, Florida.

=== College ===
DeForest is a 1987 graduate of University of Southwest Louisiana with a bachelor's degree in marketing. He was a four-year starter and was twice named to the all-Southern and all-Louisiana independent teams.

He also was a two-year letterman as a pitcher on the Ragin' Cajuns baseball squad. He received the inaugural President's Cup, signifying the University's top male athlete.

=== Professional ===
In 1987, DeForest was signed as a free agent but then released in the preseason by the Houston Oilers and then signed and quickly released by the New Orleans Saints. He finished his playing career with a brief appearance during the preseason for the Calgary Stampeders (CFL) before being cut in 1988.

== Coaching career ==
DeForest served as an assistant coach at Duke University from 1994 to 2000, serving as linebackers coach and special teams coordinator. He was hired by Les Miles in 2001 at Oklahoma State University as the special teams coordinator and secondary coach. He remained at Oklahoma State until 2012 and served as the associate head coach, special teams coordinator, and safeties coach. At Oklahoma State, he coached Matt Fodge, a Ray Guy Award winner, and Dan Bailey, a Lou Groza Award winner. In 2012, he was hired by Dana Holgorsen to serve as the defensive coordinator at West Virginia University. Due to poor performance, he was demoted to special teams coordinator following the 2012 season. West Virginia fired DeForest in 2015.

On February 26, 2016, DeForest was hired as the special teams coach at the University of Kansas. In January 2018, DeForest was fired again. In March 2018, Clay Helton, head football coach at the University of Southern California (USC), hired DeForest as a defensive quality control assistant; in 2019, DeForest coached the safeties for USC. Both Helton and DeForest had previously served as assistant coaches together at Duke. USC did not retain DeForest after the 2019 season. North Carolina State hired DeForest in 2020.

DeForest retired from football coaching following the 2024 football season.
