= Edward O'Toole =

American coal mining pioneer and inventor

Edward O’Toole (December 27, 1866 – October 2, 1940) was an American businessman and the first general superintendent U.S. Coal & Coke Company, a subsidiary of U.S. Steel Corporation. His leadership contributed to rapid economic development in southern West Virginia. O’Toole served on the staffs of two West Virginia governors, held the position of President of the Adkins District School Board, and played a key role in organizing multiple national banks. Internationally recognized as an authority in his field, he traveled around the world advising on various mining operations. He later built a movie studio in Florida and served as an executive for Colonnade Pictures Corporation.

== Early life and education ==
Edward O’Toole was born in Salineville, Ohio, to Edward and Margaret (Collins) O'Toole. His father, born in the town of Shrule in County Mayo, Ireland in 1828, was the son of a surgeon, while his mother, born in the parish of Islandeady in County Mayo in 1828, descended from a family of noted Irish scholars and farmers.

The younger Edward received his early education in the common schools of Columbiana County, Ohio. He began working in the coal mines during the summer between school terms, starting at 9 years old.

== Career in coal ==
Edward O'Toole emerged as a leader through his early immersion in coal mines and dedicated career in the field. His contributions encompassed mining, prospecting, purchasing, development, and sales. Beyond operational roles, he earned acclaim as an inventor, securing patents for machinery and advancing coal processing methods.

O’Toole's served as an engineer at H.C. Frick Coke Company where he assisted Orran W. Kennedy, the general superintendent of coal operations in Scottdale, Pennsylvania, in 1888. The consolidation of H.C. Frick Coke Company and U.S. Coal & Coke Company into U.S. Steel marked a pivotal moment in O'Toole's career. Thomas Lynch, previously from H.C. Frick Coke Company and then president of U.S. Steel's coal mining subsidiaries, appointed top-tier individuals for U.S. Coal & Coke Company to elevate mining in southern West Virginia. Lynch, already familiar with O'Toole's capabilities, facilitated his relocation to Gary, West Virginia, in 1903, where he assumed the role of an assistant to Jared M. B Reis, the general manager of operations. In 1904, O'Toole was promoted to become the longest-serving general superintendent in U.S. Coal & Coke Company history.

=== Accomplishments ===
O'Toole directed the development of coal mines of U.S. Steel in West Virginia and Lynch, Kentucky for over 30 years. He acquired multiple U.S. Patents for inventions that include the O'Toole-Jeffrey Over Cutting Machine, the O'Toole Cutting and Loading Machine, and a pioneering coal cleaning process devised for the American Coal Cleaning Corporation.

O'Toole contributed to the establishment and advocacy of Workmen's Compensation Laws in 1920s West Virginia. His political involvement with the Republican Party included serving as Colonel on the staff of Governor William M.O. Dawson from 1905-1909 and later as General on the staff of Governor William E. Glassock from 1909-1913. In 1905, O'Toole was elected as President of the Board of Education in the Adkins District, West Virginia and served in that role for 26 years.

He presented at the American Society of Mechanical Engineers on coal mine mechanization and the American Iron and Steel Institute on the benefits of dry cleaning coal. He also spoke to officials from the Norfolk and Western Railway, known for its expertise in operational efficiency.

He conducted mine inspections in Germany, Belgium, France, and England, contributing to the advancement of the U.S. Steel coal mining branch. His commitment to industrial exploration also led him to South America, where he conducted multiple trips to assess the coal market for the Central Pocahontas Coal Company and Crystal Block Companies.

=== Legacy ===
O'Toole, known as "Colonel," contributed to the economic development of southern West Virginia and southeastern Kentucky. Upon his arrival in McDowell County in 1903, the area was largely wilderness. By the 1930s, it had transformed into a well-established region with "top-notch schools", modern houses, and state-of-the-art mining plants. O'Toole formed a company baseball club, occasionally recruiting big-leaguers from as far as New York for important games against neighboring camps.

The town of Sarah Ann, West Virginia acquired its name from the wife of Edward O’Toole. O'Toole was manager of the coal company when the town applied to the government for a post office.

He was instrumental in the formation of the following institutions:

- National banks of Gary, West Virginia, Anawalt, West Virginia and Lynch, Kentucky
- Central Pocahontas Coal Company
- Crystal Block Coal & Coke Company
- Crystal Block Mining Company
- Crystal Supply Company
- Tug River Electric Company
- Kentucky River Power Company

=== U.S. Patents ===
O’Toole is credited with the approval for numerous U.S. Patents between 1914-1936.

Approved U.S. Patents
Patent No.	Title	Granted
1096795	Method of and apparatus for sinking shafts	1914
1143897	Mining-machine	1915
1283880	Mining-machine	1918
1491060	Car-dumping apparatus	1924
1495352	Mine shaft	1924
1517095	Mining apparatus	1924
1534461	Mining machine	1925
1534462	Mining machine	1925
1534463	Longwall mining machine	1925
1561481	Longwall mining machine	1925
1581686	Screen	1926
1583992	Mining machine	1926
1588987	Method of mining	1926
1617688	Rotary screen	1927
1634434	Mining and loading machine	1927
1638507	Mining and loading machine	1927
1667331	Cleaning and sizing apparatus	1928
1687306	Mining machine	1928
1687949	Heading machine	1928
1683297	Mining machine	1928
1693861	Apparatus for cleaning coal	1928
1735974	Roof support	1929
1737327	Mining machine	1929
1789252	Airplane and propeller	1931
1888636	Screening and concentrating apparatus	1932
1914282	Filter for removing dust from the air	1933
1949324	Apparatus for dry cleaning of coal	1934
1950861	Method and apparatus for feeding, and separating, dry coal from refuse	1934
1951705	Apparatus for the separation of coal and the like	1934
2009273	Apparatus for dry cleaning of coal	1935
2044628	Treating coal, ore, grain, and similar materials	1936
2154180	Dry coal cleaning apparatus	1939

== Motion Picture Executive ==
O’Toole retired from U.S. Steel in 1933 at age 66, moving from McDowell County in 1935. He later resided in South Florida and California, exploring an interest in motion pictures. After studying film in California, he returned to Florida, establishing the Coral Gables Studio and serving as an executive at Collonade Pictures Corporation in Coral Gables, Florida.

== Death ==
Two months after visiting Gary and Bluefield, West Virginia, O'Toole became ill and died at his Coral Gables home in 1940. His body was transported by train to West Virginia for funeral services at Sacred Heart Catholic Church in Bluefield. He is interred in Monte Vista Park Cemetery, Bluefield, West Virginia. O'Toole's wife, Sarah, survived him until her death in 1954.

== Personal life ==
O'Toole married Sarah Goodwin on September 25, 1893 in Saint Vincent de Paul's Church, Leisenring, Pennsylvania. Sarah, from Kilsyth, North Lanarkshire, Scotland, was educated in Pennsylvania's common schools and worked as a housekeeper. They had nine children between 1894 and 1913.

Their firstborn, William J. O'Toole, was Minister to Paraguay in 1922 at age 28, the youngest to hold such a position. William died from a fall while overseeing construction at the American Coal Cleaning Company's plant in Gilliam, West Virginia, where he served as the corporation's president.
