= Wilkinson, West Virginia =

- Unincorporated community
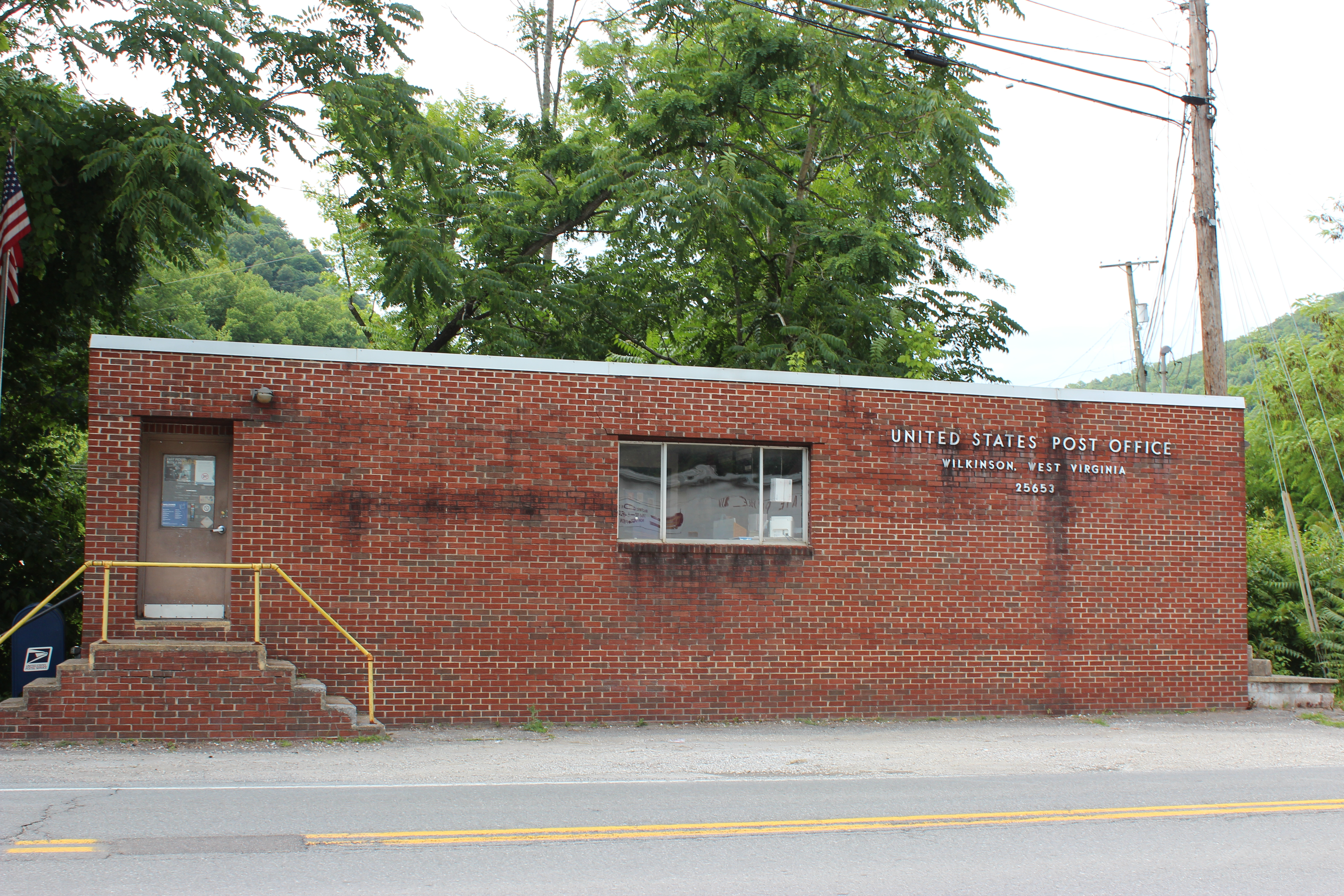
- Wilkinson Post Office

- Location within West Virginia Location within the United States
- Coordinates: 37°49′40″N 81°59′51″W
- Country: United States
- State: West Virginia
- County: Logan
- Elevation: 682 ft (208 m)
- Time zone: UTC-5 (Eastern (EST))
  - Summer (DST): UTC-4 (EDT)
- ZIP code: 25653
- Area codes: 304 & 681
- GNIS feature ID: 1555988

Wilkinson is an unincorporated community in Logan County, West Virginia, United States. Wilkinson is located along West Virginia Route 44 and Island Creek, 1.5 miles (2.4 km) south of Logan. Wilkinson has a post office with ZIP code 25653.

The community was named after Judge Wilkinson, the original owner of the town site.
