= Chauncey, West Virginia =

- Census-designated place
- Location within West Virginia Location within the United States
- Coordinates: 37°45′58″N 81°59′15″W
- Country: United States
- State: West Virginia
- County: Logan

Area
  - Total: 1.445 sq mi (3.74 km^{2})
  - Land: 1.437 sq mi (3.72 km^{2})
  - Water: 0.008 sq mi (0.021 km^{2})
- Elevation: 794 ft (242 m)

Population (2020)
  - Total: 234
  - Density: 163/sq mi (62.9/km^{2})
- Time zone: UTC-5 (Eastern (EST))
  - Summer (DST): UTC-4 (EDT)
- ZIP code: 25612
- Area codes: 304 & 681
- GNIS feature ID: 1554115

Chauncey is a census-designated place (CDP) in Logan County, West Virginia, United States. Chauncey is located along West Virginia Route 44 and Island Creek, 5.5 miles (8.9 km) south of Logan. Chauncey had a post office, which opened on August 23, 1913, and closed on June 27, 2009. As of the 2020 census, its population is 234 (down from 283 at the 2010 census).
