= Mountain View, Logan County, West Virginia =

Mountain View, West Virginia
- Unincorporated community
- Location within West Virginia Location within the United States
- Coordinates: 37°38′59″N 81°59′41″W
- Country: United States
- State: West Virginia
- County: Logan
- Elevation: 1,703 ft (519 m)
- Time zone: UTC-5 (Eastern (EST))
  - Summer (DST): UTC-4 (EDT)
- Area codes: 304 & 681
- GNIS feature ID: 1543874

Mountain View is an unincorporated community in Logan County, West Virginia, United States. Mountain View is located near Island Creek and the junction of U.S. Route 52 and West Virginia Route 44, 7.4 miles (11.9 km) west-northwest of Gilbert.
