= Pie, West Virginia =

- Unincorporated community
- Location within West Virginia Location within the United States
- Coordinates: 37°39′12″N 82°01′32″W
- Country: United States
- State: West Virginia
- County: Mingo
- Elevation: 1,266 ft (386 m)
- Time zone: UTC-5 (Eastern (EST))
  - Summer (DST): UTC-4 (EDT)
- ZIP codes: 25689
- Area codes: 304 & 681
- GNIS feature ID: 1555339

Pie is an unincorporated community in Mingo County, West Virginia, United States. Pie is located on U.S. Route 52 along Pigeon Creek; the community lies along the road for 3 miles (4.8 km), from Horsepen Mountain to Grants Branch. According to Pie's 1933 postmaster, the community was named for Leander Blankenship, a resident "who really like[d] pie, regardless of kind".

== Gallery ==
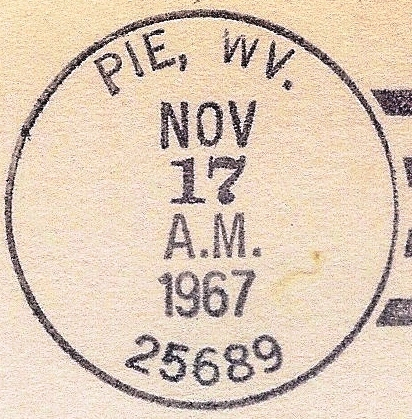
Pie postmark
