= Sarah Ann, West Virginia =

- Census-designated place
- Location within West Virginia Location within the United States
- Coordinates: 37°42′40″N 81°59′14″W
- Country: United States
- State: West Virginia
- County: Logan

Area
  - Total: 1.827 sq mi (4.73 km^{2})
  - Land: 1.827 sq mi (4.73 km^{2})
  - Water: 0 sq mi (0 km^{2})
- Elevation: 997 ft (304 m)

Population (2020)
  - Total: 207
  - Density: 113/sq mi (43.7/km^{2})
- Time zone: UTC-5 (Eastern (EST))
  - Summer (DST): UTC-4 (EDT)
- ZIP code: 25644
- Area codes: 304 & 681
- GNIS feature ID: 1555572
- FIPS code: 54-72004

Sarah Ann is a census-designated place (CDP) in Logan County, West Virginia, United States. The CDP includes the unincorporated community of Sarah Ann, plus the neighboring communities of Crystal Block and part of Stirrat. As of the 2020 census, the population of the CDP was 207 (down from 345 at the 2010 census).

== Geography ==
Sarah Ann is located in southwestern Logan County along West Virginia Route 44 in the valley of Island Creek. WV-44 leads north (downstream) 12 miles (19 km) to Logan, the county seat, and south 5 miles (8 km) to U.S. Route 52 at the head of the valley. Sarah Ann has a post office with ZIP code 25644.

According to the U.S. Census Bureau, the Sarah Ann CDP has a total area of 1.8 square miles (4.7 km^{2}), all land.

== History ==
The community was named for Sarah O'Toole, wife of US Coal and Coke official Edward O'Toole, and Ann Shanklin, wife of the company's doctor, Doctor Shanklin.

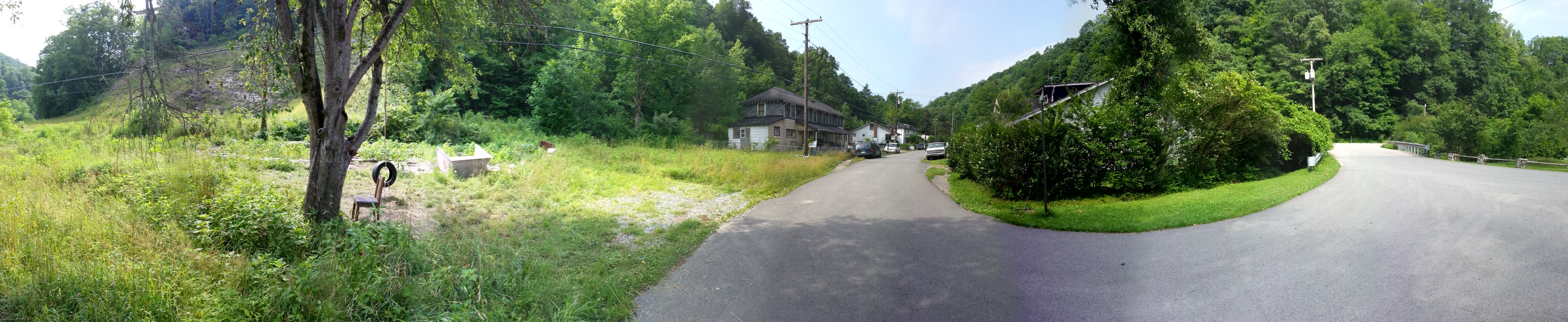
Sarah Ann, 2014
