= Mike Brittain =

American basketball player

Personal information
- Born: June 21, 1963 Clearwater, Florida, U.S.
- Died: October 17, 1995 (Age 32) Atlanta, Georgia, U.S.
- Listed height: 7 ft 0 in (2.13 m)
- Listed weight: 235 lb (107 kg)

Career information
- High school: Clearwater (Clearwater, Florida)
- College: South Carolina (1981–1985)
- NBA draft: 1985: 2nd round, 29th overall pick
- Drafted by: San Antonio Spurs
- Playing career: 1985–1987
- Position: Center
- Number: 40

Career history
- 1985–1987: San Antonio Spurs
- 1988–1989: Pensacola Tornados
- Stats at NBA.com
- Stats at Basketball Reference

Michael James Brittain (June 21, 1963 – October 17, 1995) was an American professional basketball player.

In his senior year at Clearwater High School, the 7-foot center led the Jack Wilson-coached Clearwater High Tornadoes to a 32–3 record and the 1981 Class 4A State title. Brittain scored 32 points in the State Championship game, winning easily over Miami Central 79–53.

Brittain went on to play collegiately for the University of South Carolina.

He was selected by the National Basketball Association's San Antonio Spurs in the second round (29th pick overall) of the 1985 NBA draft and played for the Spurs for 38 games between 1985 and 1987. He also played a season in the Continental Basketball Association (CBA) for the Pensacola Tornados, averaging 1.9 points and 2.3 rebounds in 15 games.

On October 21, 1995, Brittain was found dead in his Atlanta, Georgia, apartment. The DeKalb County Medical Examiner's Office attributed his death to high blood-alcohol concentration, based on toxicology tests performed by the Georgia Bureau of Investigation. At the time of his death, he was working as a regional manager for a pharmaceutical company there.

== Career statistics ==
Legend
GP	Games played	GS	Games started	MPG	Minutes per game
FG%	Field goal percentage	3P%	3-point field goal percentage	FT%	Free throw percentage
RPG	Rebounds per game	APG	Assists per game	SPG	Steals per game
BPG	Blocks per game	PPG	Points per game	**Bold**	Career high

=== NBA ===
==== Regular season ====
Year	Team	GP	GS	MPG	FG%	3P%	FT%	RPG	APG	SPG	BPG	PPG
1985–86	San Antonio	**32**	**2**	**6.8**	**.512**	–	**.526**	**1.5**	.2	.1	**.4**	**1.7**
1986–87	San Antonio	6	0	4.8	.444	–	.500	.7	**.3**	**.2**	.0	1.5
Career		38	2	6.5	.500	–	.524	1.4	.2	.1	.3	1.7

==== Playoffs ====
Year	Team	GP	GS	MPG	FG%	3P%	FT%	RPG	APG	SPG	BPG	PPG
1986	San Antonio	1	0	2.0	.500	–	–	1.0	.0	.0	1.0	2.0
