= Stirrat, West Virginia =

- Unincorporated community
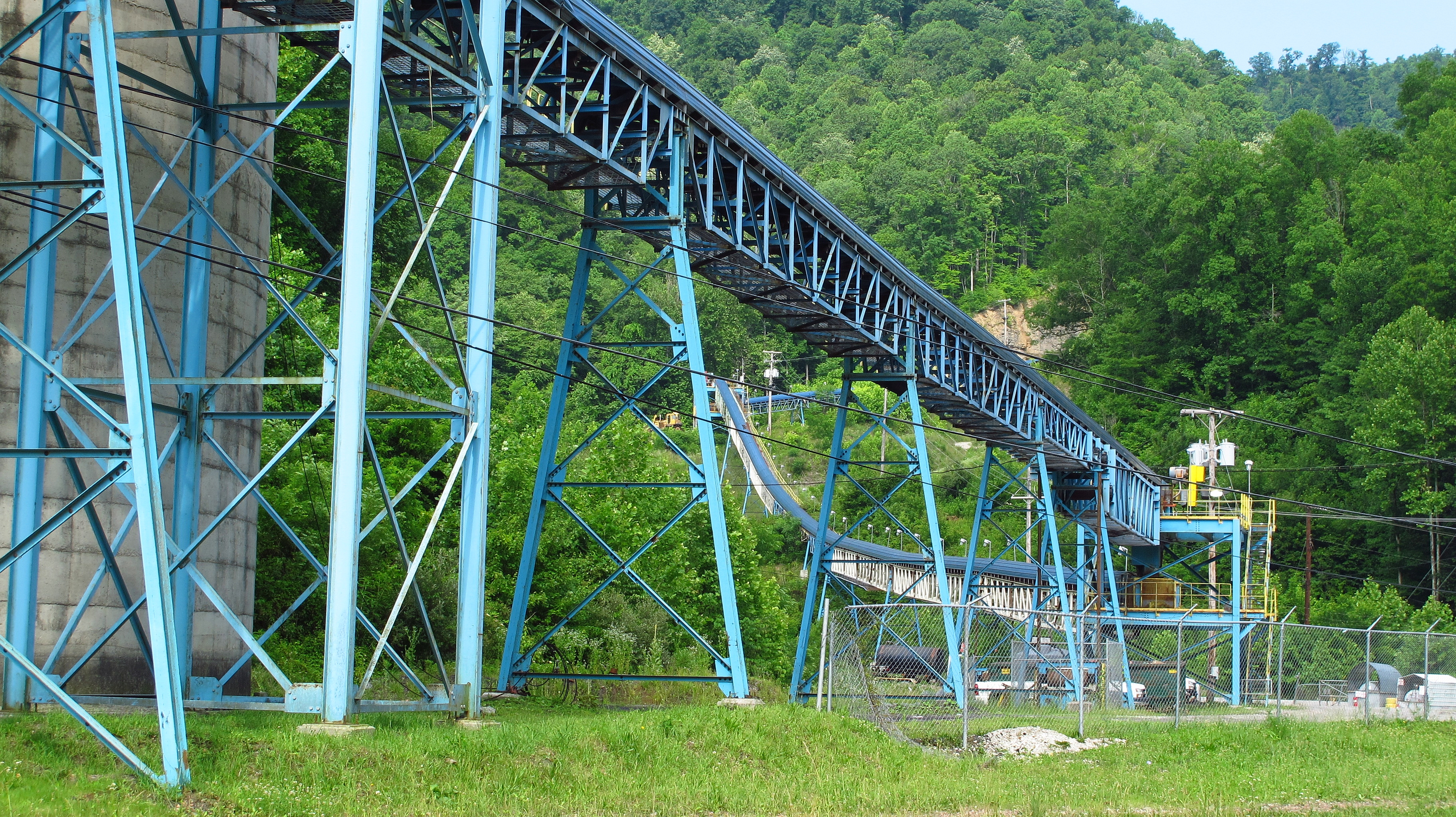
- Coal conveyor in Stirrat

- Location within West Virginia Location within the United States
- Coordinates: 37°43′35″N 82°00′08″W
- Country: United States
- State: West Virginia
- County: Logan
- Elevation: 912 ft (278 m)
- Time zone: UTC-5 (Eastern (EST))
  - Summer (DST): UTC-4 (EDT)
- Area codes: 304 & 681
- GNIS feature ID: 1555715

Stirrat is an unincorporated community in Logan County, West Virginia, United States. Stirrat is located along Island Creek and West Virginia Route 44, 8.4 miles (13.5 km) south of Logan. The southern part of the community is within the Sarah Ann census-designated place.
