= Clearwater High School =

Public high school in Clearwater, Florida, United States

Coordinates: 27.959343°N 82.754585°W

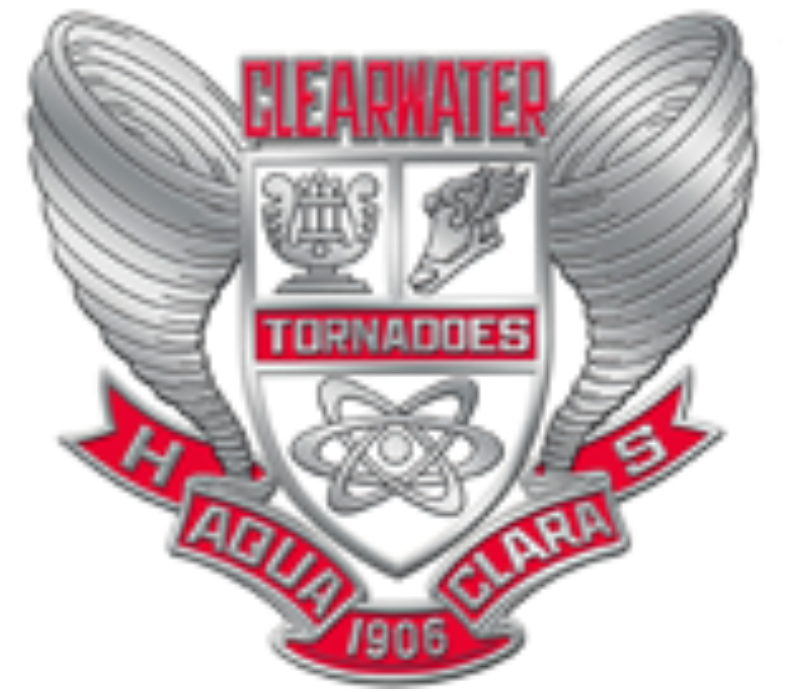

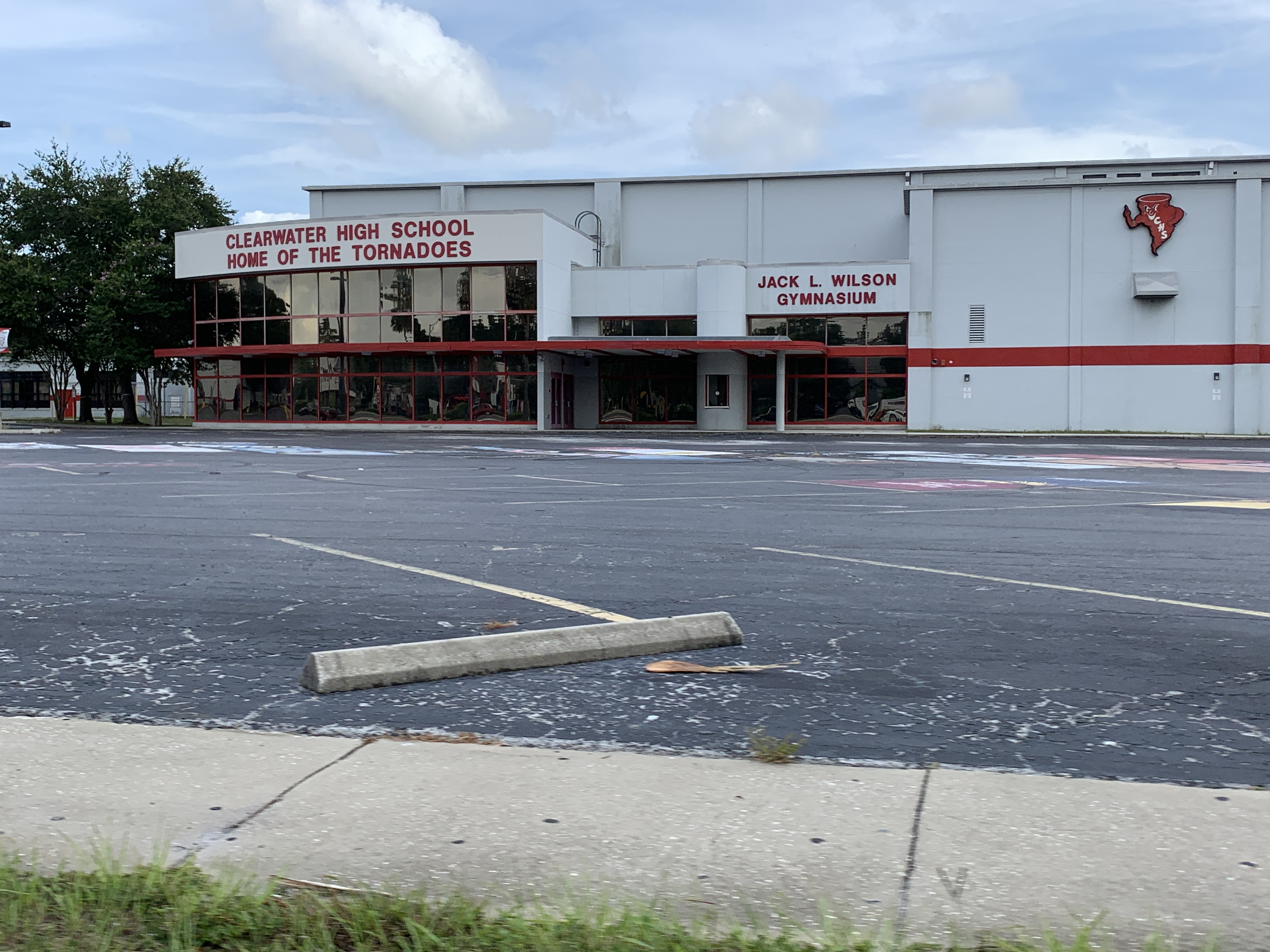
- Front of the school, 2010

Location
- 1951 Gulf to Bay Boulevard; Clearwater, Florida 33765; United States

Information
- Type: Public secondary
- Motto: Tradition, Honor and Pride
- Established: 1906
- School district: Pinellas County Schools
- Principal: Robert Florio
- Faculty: 76.00 (FTE)
- Teaching staff: 102
- Grades: 9-12
- Enrollment: 1,664 (2022-23)
- Student to teacher ratio: 21.89
- Colors: Crimson and Gray
- Nickname: Tornadoes
- Website: clearwater-hs.pcsb.org

Clearwater High School (CHS) is a four-year public high school located in Clearwater, Florida, United States. It is part of the Pinellas County School System. The school mascot is a tornado, therefore students and faculty are known as the Tornadoes. Their colors are crimson and gray, which is also the name of their fight song.

== History ==
Clearwater High School traces its lineage to 1906, when three 9th-graders were enrolled at a small schoolhouse built that year on Ft. Harrison Avenue. In 1924, Clearwater High School was built on Greenwood Avenue, where it remained until the current campus on Hercules Avenue was completed in 1954. In 1999, a $12-million renovation of the facilities was completed.

In 2022, a new school was built. The only portion of the original school that remained after this renovation was the drama room, band room, auditorium and the gym.

== Academics ==
Clearwater High has various academic programs, also known as Academies, centering on different aspects of life beyond high school, as well as an optional University of Cambridge AICE Diploma program alongside them. In 2017, The Washington Post ranked it as the "most challenging high school" in Pinellas County, based on the number of Advanced Placement and International Baccalaureate students as a percentage of graduating seniors. The school offered 18 AP courses that year, while attaining an 88% graduation rate, with 73% of graduates going on to attend a four-year college.

== Athletics ==
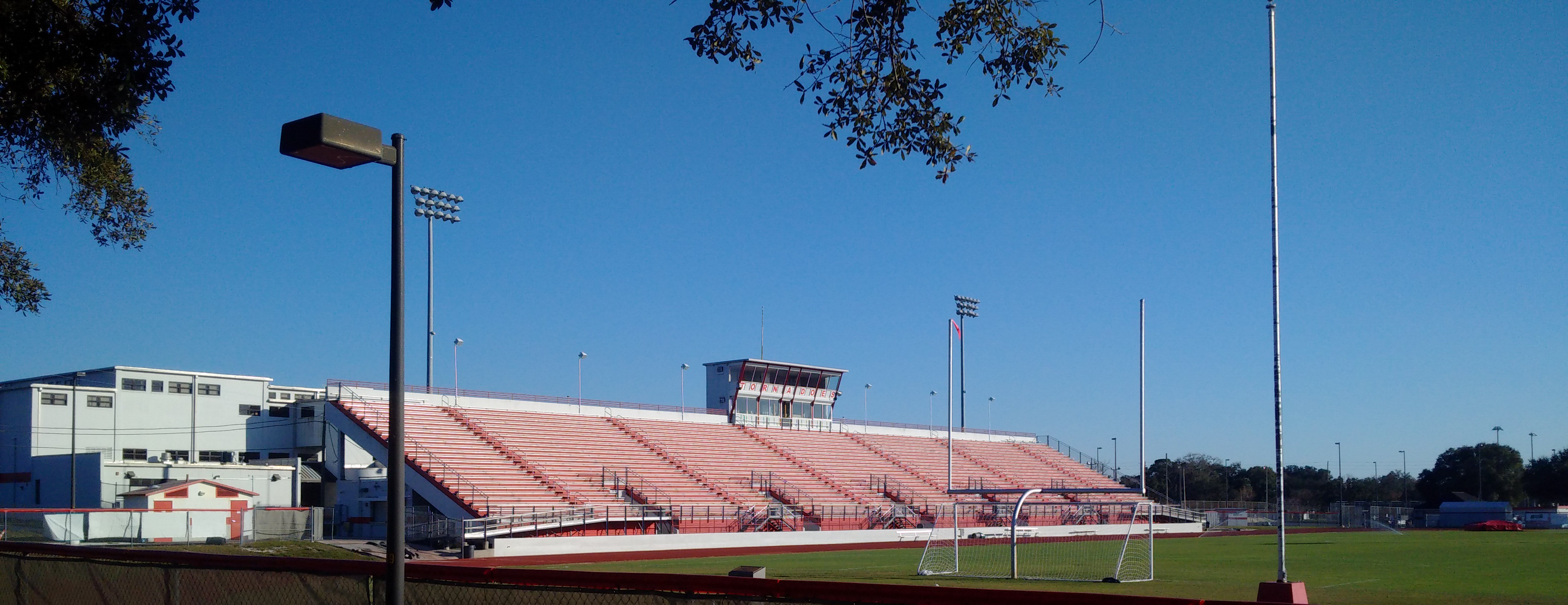
Clearwater High School's Jack White Stadium, 2010

The school's 4,200-seat football stadium was built in 1950 and dedicated in 1951 as Central Pinellas Stadium. It 1963, it was renamed to honor Jack White, a judge on the Florida Second District Court of Appeal, who was a leading figure in the effort beginning in 1949 to build the stadium.

In addition to football, other boys' sports include baseball, swimming, and wrestling. The Clearwater Tornadoes compete in a variety of sports for both boys and girls, including basketball, soccer, golf, track and field, lacrosse, and tennis. Under head coach Jack Wilson, the Tornadoes won the boys' basketball state championship in 1981. The school's Jack L. Wilson Gymnasium is named in his memory.

The school has also won state championships in the following sports:

- Boys Golf (1968)
- Girls Cross Country (1976)
- Girls Track (1977)
- Boys Swimming (1978)
- Girls Volleyball (1997 and 2000)
- Boys Soccer (2001)

== Notable alumni ==
- Sara Blakely (class of 1989), founder and part owner of Spanx, minority owner of the Atlanta Hawks
- Alan Boss (class of 1969), theoretical astrophysicist and astronomer at the Carnegie Institution for Science
- Mike Brittain (class of 1981), NBA center for the San Antonio Spurs
- Gene Chizik (class of 1980), former head football coach at Auburn University
- Rich Fields (class of 1979), The Price Is Right announcer
- Jeremiah George (class of 2010), NFL linebacker for the Indianapolis Colts
- Randall Goodgame (class of 1992), Christian singer/songwriter
- Howard Johnson (class of 1978), MLB third baseman for the New York Mets
- Hassan Jones (class of 1982), NFL wide receiver for the Minnesota Vikings
- Luke Loucks (class of 2008), head coach, Florida State University men's basketball
- Robert Margalis (class of 1999), Olympic team trials swimmer and Pan American Games gold medalist
- Nancy McEldowney (class of 1977), academic
- Bruce Melnick (class of 1967), NASA astronaut
- Scott Nicolas (class of 1978), NFL linebacker for the Cleveland Browns
- Joel Parker (class of 1970), NFL wide receiver for the New Orleans Saints
- Nicole Passonno Stott (class of 1980), NASA astronaut
- Okaro White (class of 2010), NBA power forward for the Miami Heat
