= Chafin House =

- U.S. National Register of Historic Places
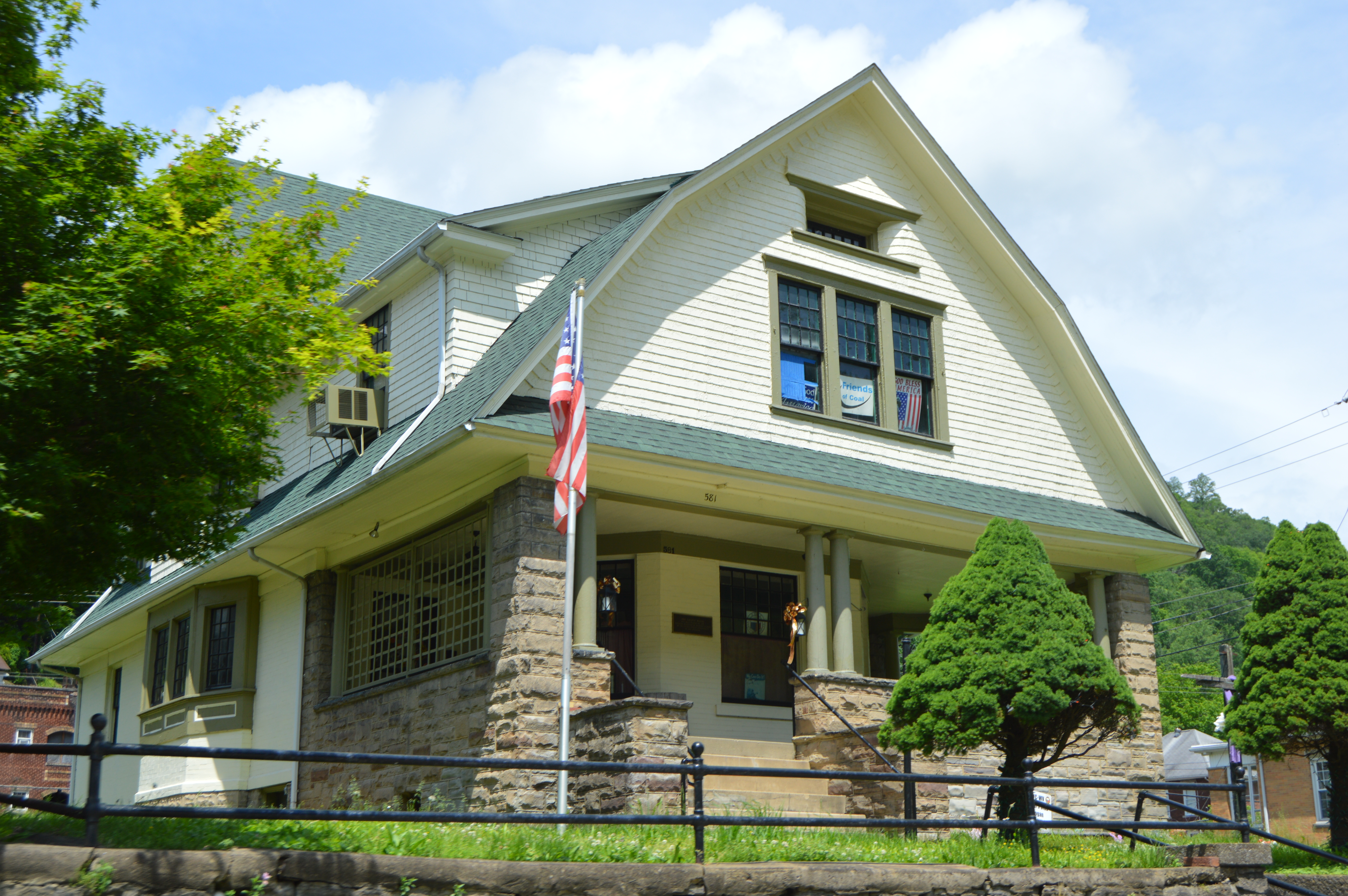
- The Chafin House in 2020.

- Location within West Virginia Location within the United States
- Location: 581 Main Street in Logan, West Virginia
- Coordinates: 37°50′41.0″N 81°59′09.0″W
- Built: 1916
- NRHP reference No.: 94000217
- Added to NRHP: 1994

The Chafin House is a two-story, house that formerly belonged to Don Chafin. It was built in 1900, with Shingle style architecture that sits on main street in Logan, West Virginia.

It was listed on the National Register of Historic Places in 1994.

== See also ==
- National Register of Historic Places listings in Logan County, West Virginia
