= Robert Shogan =

American journalist and author (1930–2013)

- Born: September 12, 1930; New York City
- Died: October 30, 2013 (aged 83); Washington, D.C.
- Education: Syracuse University
- Occupations: Journalist and author
- Notable credit: Los Angeles Times

Robert Shogan (September 12, 1930 – October 30, 2013) was an American journalist and author. He spent more than 25 years at the Washington bureau of the Los Angeles Times. He also worked for the Detroit Free Press, Newsweek, and The Wall Street Journal. He taught at Johns Hopkins University, among other institutions.

== Books ==
Shogan wrote many works of historical nonfiction and media criticism. Particularly praised was The Battle of Blair Mountain: The Story of America's Largest Labor Uprising, published in 2004. Kirkus Reviews called it "a stunning re-creation of the great West Virginia uprising of 1921 ... crackingly told." The Journal of Appalachian Studies declared that "among other successes, this book presents a valuable short history of the U.S. labor movement and its discontents through crystalline evocations of figures like Samuel Gompers, John L. Lewis, the Wobblies, and Mother Jones." Greil Marcus, in a revised edition of The Old, Weird America: The World of Bob Dylan's Basement Tapes, cited it as a worthy source about the Battle of Blair Mountain.

External videos
- Booknotes interview with Shogan on The Riddle of Power, April 21, 1991, C-SPAN
- Washington Journal interview with Shogan on Hard Bargain, May 5, 1995, C-SPAN
- Presentation by Shogan on Hard Bargain, September 14, 1995, C-SPAN
- Presentation by Shogan on The Double-Edged Sword, January 8, 1998, C-SPAN
- Presentation by Shogan on Bad News, June 7, 2001, C-SPAN
- Washington Journal interview with Shogan on War Without End, September 1, 2002, C-SPAN
- Presentation by Shogan on No Sense of Decency, April 16, 2009, C-SPAN
- Presentation by Shogan on Prelude to Catastrophe, October 23, 2010, C-SPAN

Publishers Weekly wrote that Bad News: Where the Press Goes Wrong in the Making of the President, published in 2001, was a "carefully crafted retrospective on the media and presidential campaigns since JFK ... a highly readable chronicle." Reviewing 1991's The Riddle of Power: Presidential Leadership From Truman to Bush, The New York Times stated that it was "on balance ... a lively and straightforward primer on leadership."

== Selected bibliography ==
- The Detroit Race Riot: A Study in Violence, with Tom Craig (1964)
- A Question of Judgment: The Fortas Case and the Struggle for the Supreme Court (1972)
- Promises to Keep: Carter's First Hundred Days (1977)
- Riddle of Power: Presidential Leadership from Truman to Bush (1991)
- Hard Bargain: How FDR Twisted Churchill's Arm, Evaded the Law, and Changed the Role of the American Presidency (1995)
- Bad News: Where the Press Goes Wrong in the Making of the President (2001)
- The Battle of Blair Mountain: The Story of America's Largest Labor Uprising (2004)
- No Sense of Decency: The Army–McCarthy Hearings: A Demagogue Falls and Television Takes Charge of American Politics (2009)
- Prelude to Catastrophe: FDR's Jews and the Menace of Nazism (2010)
- Harry Truman and the Struggle for Racial Justice (2013)
