= Titusville High School =

Public high school in Titusville, Florida, United States

Location
- Titusville, Florida 32780; United States; 28°35′33.17″N 80°48′18.38″W

Information
- Type: Public
- Motto: Meet the challenge every day!
- Established: 1927
- Principal: Jennifer Gonzalez
- Staff: 61.00 (FTE)
- Enrollment: 1,314 (2022–23)
- Student to teacher ratio: 21.54
- Campus: Suburban
- Colors: Royal blue and bright gold
- Mascot: Terrier
- Rival: Astronaut High School
- Website: www.brevardschools.org/TitusvilleHS

Titusville High School is part of the Brevard Public Schools System. It is located at 150 Terrier Trail South, Titusville, Florida.

== History ==
In 1927, Titusville High School was founded at the current location, the first building devoted solely to high school classes in the city. The Spanish-style structure featured terrazzo floors, brick halls, an auditorium, cafeteria, a large second-floor library, and one-story wings housing industrial arts and home economics departments. Over the entrance was a bell tower, which was reproduced in smaller form as a monument when the building was demolished in 1972. None of the original structure remains.

The school was partially integrated in 1966, and fully integrated in 1967 with African-American students coming from the previously all-black school, the Andrew J. Gibson High School.

== Campus ==
The campus contains several buildings: the two-story Dorothy S. Wise Instructional Building; the Science, Art, and Health Occupations Building; Fine and Performing Arts Buildings; Cafeteria, Gym, Media Center and Administrative offices.

A new football stadium was completed in mid-2007. Two buildings were constructed in 2008: An Administrative/Science/Freshman Center and a Performing Arts building.

== Sports ==
Its primary sports rival is Astronaut High School.

=== State championships ===
- Boys Cross Country State Champions 1968, 1971 and 1977
- Football State Champions 1982 and 1983
- Girls Bowling state champions 2014.
- Girls [Volleyball] State Champions 1981 & 1983.

== Notable alumni ==
- Brad Davis, actor
- Joe DeForest (1983), former professional football player and college coach
- Bernard Giles (drop out), serial killer and rapist
- Michaela Hahn (2011), former professional soccer player
- J. T. Hassell (transferred), NFL safety for the New York Jets
- Charlie Huggins (1965), retired U.S. Army colonel, former president of the Alaska Senate
- John Jurasek (2015), YouTube personality, food critic and radio host
- Mitzi Kremer (1986), 1988 US Olympic swimming medalist
- Gerald White (1983), former professional football player
- Eugene M. Davis (1970), actor
- Doug Sisson (1981), Major League Baseball Coach

== Notable faculty ==
- Jack Wilson, two-time Florida state champion high school basketball coach & former Anderson University basketball player
