= Horsepen Mountain =

Mountain in United States of America

Highest point
- Elevation: 2,500 ft (760 m)
- Coordinates: 37°38′26″N 81°59′36″W

Geography
- Location: Logan and Mingo Counties, West Virginia, U.S.
- Parent range: Appalachian Plateau
- Topo map: USGS Man

Horsepen Mountain is a mountain of the Appalachian Plateau on the border of Logan and Mingo Counties, West Virginia, United States. It is the highest point in Mingo County. The Mingo Lookout Tower is located on the mountain.
