= West Virginia Route 44 =

State highway in West Virginia, United States

West Virginia Route 44
- Jerry West Highway

Route information
- Maintained by WVDOH
- Length: 16.8 mi (27.0 km)

Major junctions
- South end: US 52 / CR 8 near Mountain View
- North end: WV 73 / CR 18 in Logan

Location
- Country: United States
- State: West Virginia
- Counties: Logan

Highway system
- West Virginia State Highway System; Interstate; US; State
| ← WV 43 | → WV 45 |

West Virginia Route 44 is a north–south state highway located within Logan County, West Virginia. The southern terminus of the route is at U.S. Route 52 one mile south of Mountain View. The northern terminus is at West Virginia Route 73 in Logan. It is marked as the Jerry West Highway after the basketball player who had jersey 44.

== Route description ==
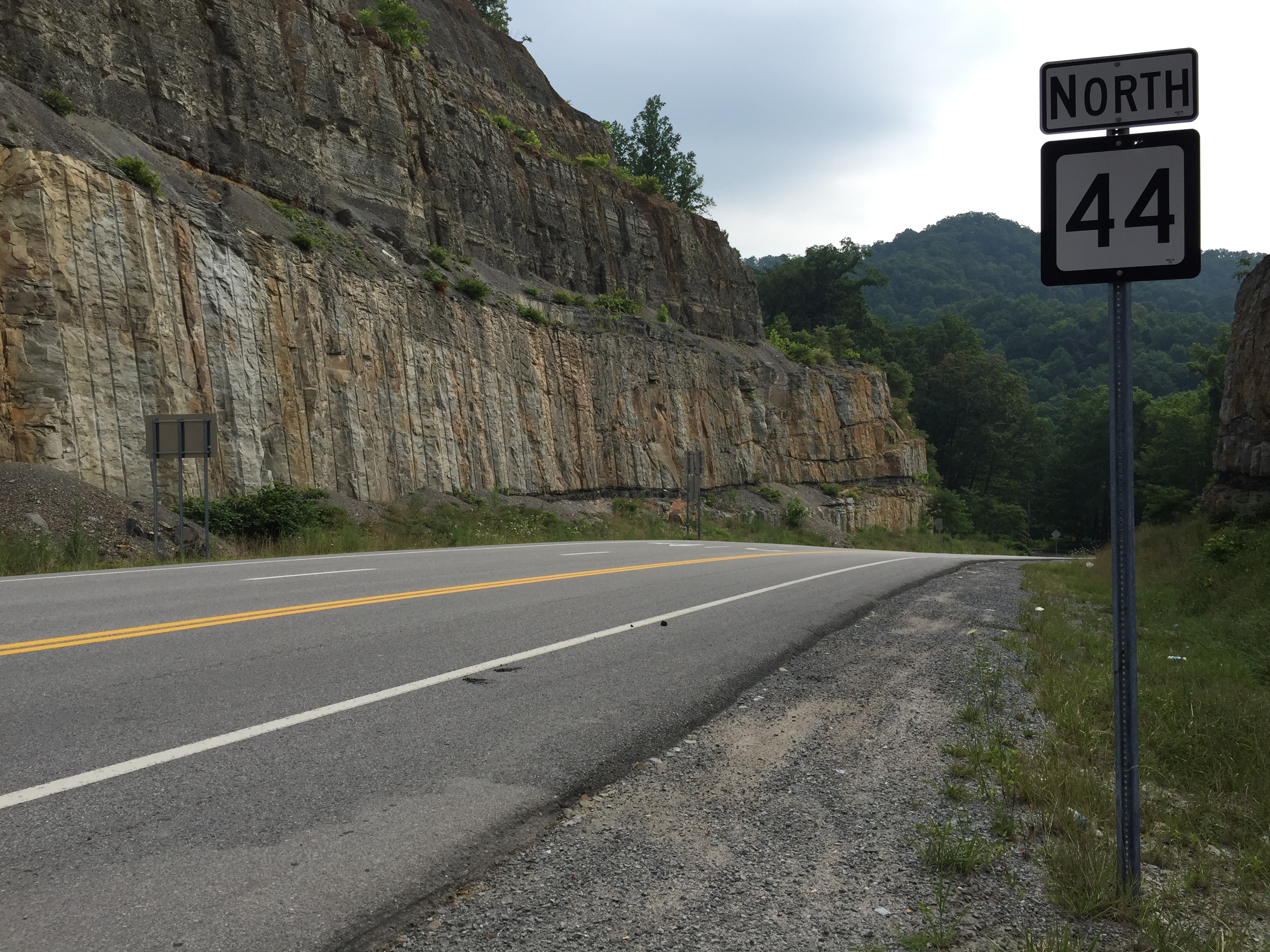
View north along WV 44 at US 52 near Mountain View

West Virginia Route 44 begins traveling northward from its southern terminus at The King Coal Highway (US 52 near the Logan-Mingo county line). Like many other highways in West Virginia, the road curves a lot and is very hilly because of the Appalachian Mountains throughout the state. The route travels mainly north for 16.8 miles before meeting its northern terminus at WV 73 just south of Logan, which is the county seat of Logan County and the only city in the county by definition. WV 44 passes through many small communities on its short route. From south to north, the highway passes through the CDP of Sarah Ann, the unincorporated community of Stirrat, the CDPs of Omar, Chauncey, Switzer, Rossmore, and Monaville, the unincorporated community of Wilkinson, and the CDP of Mount Gay-Shamrock where it meets its northern terminus. It also passes just east of the unincorporated community of Barnabus.

== History ==
WV 44 was once part of U.S. Route 119.

== Major intersections ==
| County | Location | mi | km | Destinations | Notes |
|---|---|---|---|---|---|
| Mingo | | | | US 52 north (King Coal Highway) / CR 8 (Beech Creek Road) – Williamson | Southern terminus; south end of US 52 overlap |
| Mingo | Mountain View | | | US 52 south / CR 252/57 (Old US 52) – Williamson, Welch | north end of US 52 overlap |
| Logan | Mount Gay-Shamrock | | | WV 73 / CR 18 (Holden Road) to US 119 – Charleston, Holden, Logan | Northern terminus |
1.000 mi = 1.609 km; 1.000 km = 0.621 mi: Concurrency terminus

== See also ==
- List of state highways in West Virginia
- List of highways numbered 44
