= Logan, West Virginia =

City in West Virginia, US

- City
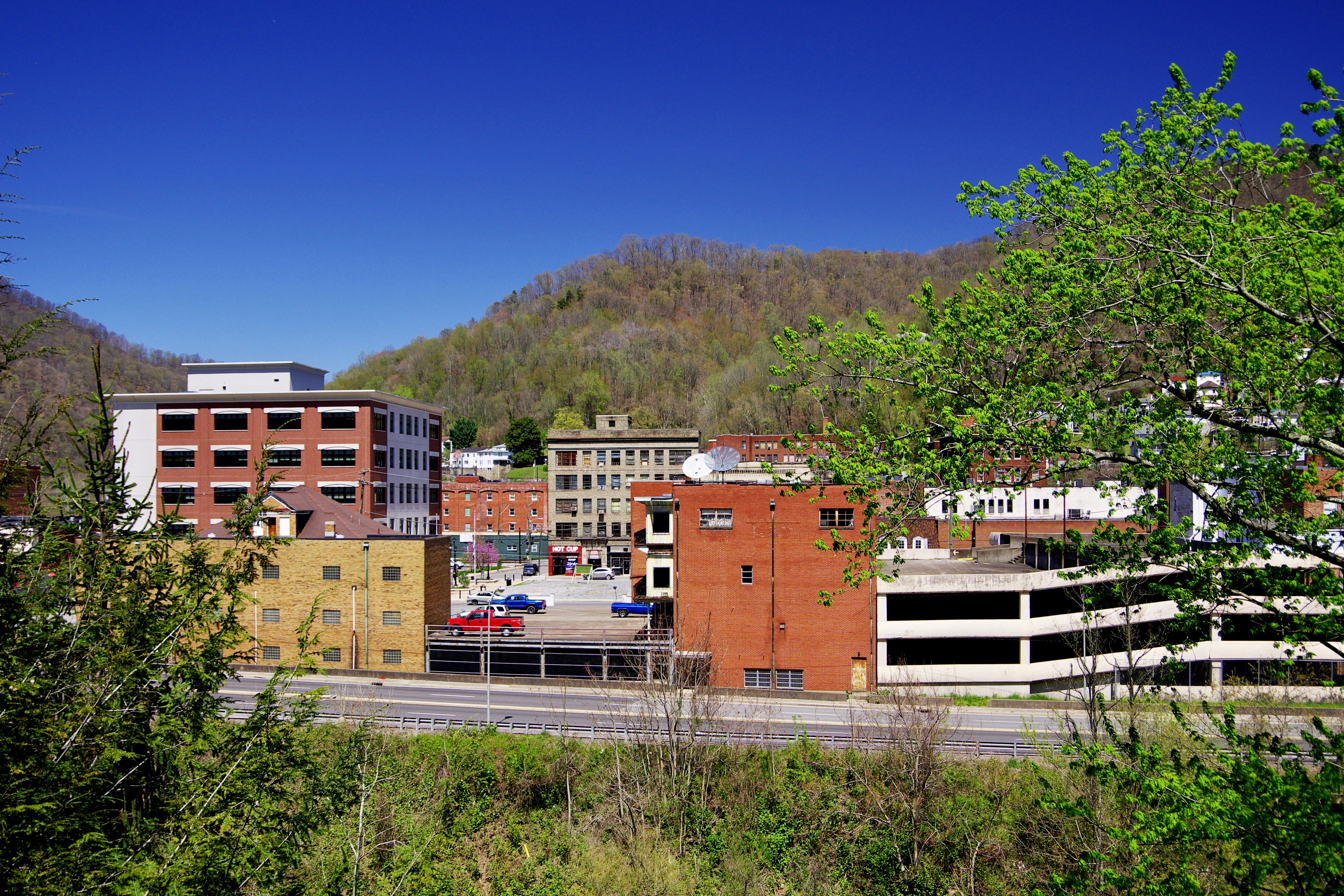
- Logan

- Seal
- Interactive map of Logan, West Virginia
- Location within West Virginia Location within the United States
- Coordinates: 37°50′54″N 81°59′16″W
- Country: United States
- State: West Virginia
- County: Logan
- Laid out: 1827
- Chartered: 1852

Government
  - Mayor: Serafino Nolletti

Area
  - Total: 1.24 sq mi (3.20 km^{2})
  - Land: 1.15 sq mi (2.97 km^{2})
  - Water: 0.085 sq mi (0.22 km^{2})
- Elevation: 679 ft (207 m)

Population (2020)
  - Total: 1,439
  - Estimate (2021): 1,400
  - Density: 1,281.0/sq mi (494.59/km^{2})
- Time zone: UTC-5 (Eastern (EST))
  - Summer (DST): UTC-4 (EDT)
- ZIP code: 25601
- Area codes: 304 & 681
- FIPS code: 54-48148
- GNIS feature ID: 1542310
- Website: https://www.cityofloganwv.com/

Logan is a city in Logan County, West Virginia, United States, along the Guyandotte River. The population was 1,438 at the 2020 census. It is the county seat of Logan County.

== History ==
What is now Logan was initially called "Islands of the Guyandot" by explorers who identified the site in the 1780s. In 1827, a town was laid out at the site to serve as a county seat for Logan County, which had been established in 1824. The city was initially known as "Lawsonsville" after Anthony Lawson, an early merchant, but was shortened to "Lawnsville." In the early 1850s, Thomas Dunn English, a poet and future congressman, led efforts to reorganize the town. When the town incorporated in 1852, it was renamed "Aracoma" after the Shawnee chief Cornstalk's daughter, who had been killed by settlers in the area in 1780. The city was renamed "Logan" in 1907 after the Mingo leader, Chief Logan.

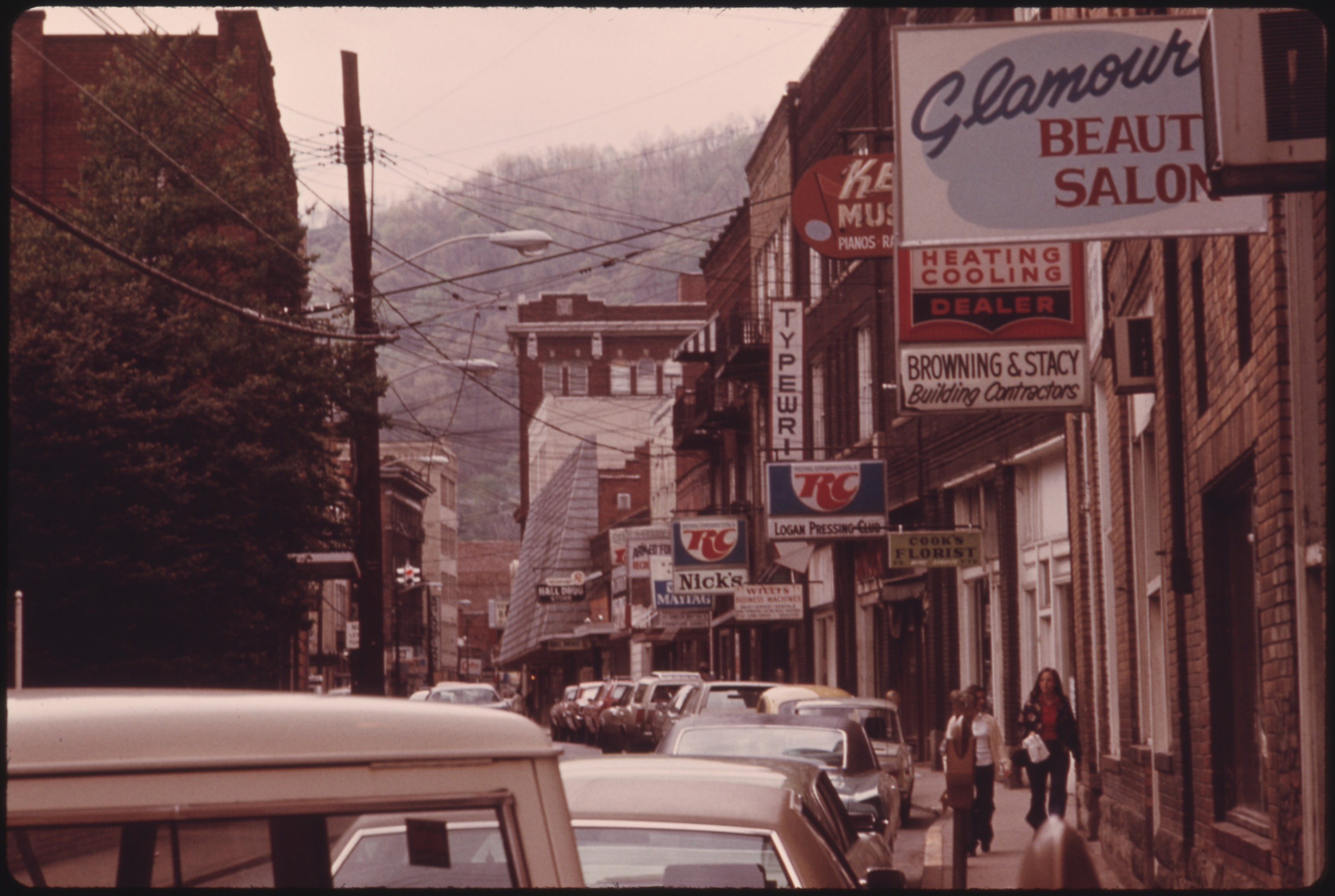
Logan in 1974

Logan grew continuously during the late 19th and early 20th centuries as a hub of the regional coal industry. At its height in 1940, the city had a population of over 5,000, and was home to numerous businesses, including furniture stores, hotels, banks, and car dealerships. Logan began to decline following World War II, due in large part to the increased mechanization of the coal industry.

The Chafin House, was listed on the National Register of Historic Places in 1994. Logan was home to the Logan Indians, a minor league baseball team, from 1937 to 1942.

== Geography ==
Logan is located at the confluence of the Guyandotte River and Island Creek.

According to the United States Census Bureau, the city has a total area of 1.24 square miles (3.21 km^{2}), of which 1.15 square miles (2.98 km^{2}) is land and 0.09 square miles (0.23 km^{2}) is water.

=== Climate ===
Climate data for Logan, West Virginia (1991–2020 normals, extremes 1901–present)
Month	Jan	Feb	Mar	Apr	May	Jun	Jul	Aug	Sep	Oct	Nov	Dec	Year
Record high °F (°C)	81 (27)	83 (28)	91 (33)	95 (35)	99 (37)	105 (41)	104 (40)	102 (39)	103 (39)	97 (36)	87 (31)	79 (26)	105 (41)
Mean daily maximum °F (°C)	44.5 (6.9)	49.3 (9.6)	58.9 (14.9)	71.2 (21.8)	78.7 (25.9)	85.8 (29.9)	88.6 (31.4)	87.5 (30.8)	81.9 (27.7)	70.2 (21.2)	58.4 (14.7)	48.0 (8.9)	68.6 (20.3)
Daily mean °F (°C)	35.6 (2.0)	39.2 (4.0)	46.8 (8.2)	57.5 (14.2)	66.3 (19.1)	74.2 (23.4)	77.8 (25.4)	76.7 (24.8)	70.4 (21.3)	58.5 (14.7)	47.2 (8.4)	39.3 (4.1)	57.5 (14.2)
Mean daily minimum °F (°C)	26.6 (−3.0)	29.0 (−1.7)	34.8 (1.6)	43.8 (6.6)	54.0 (12.2)	62.6 (17.0)	66.9 (19.4)	65.8 (18.8)	59.0 (15.0)	46.7 (8.2)	36.0 (2.2)	30.7 (−0.7)	46.3 (7.9)
Record low °F (°C)	−15 (−26)	−11 (−24)	−2 (−19)	19 (−7)	29 (−2)	35 (2)	45 (7)	42 (6)	34 (1)	18 (−8)	7 (−14)	−8 (−22)	−15 (−26)
Average precipitation inches (mm)	3.45 (88)	3.45 (88)	4.33 (110)	4.36 (111)	5.33 (135)	4.89 (124)	5.88 (149)	3.94 (100)	3.34 (85)	3.17 (81)	2.94 (75)	4.16 (106)	49.24 (1,251)
Average precipitation days (≥ 0.01 in)	14.7	13.4	14.1	13.1	14.5	13.6	13.7	10.5	10.4	11.0	10.6	14.6	154.2
Source: NOAA

== Demographics ==
Historical population
Census	Pop.	Note	%±
1900	444		—
1910	1,640		269.4%
1920	2,998		82.8%
1930	4,396		46.6%
1940	5,166		17.5%
1950	5,079		−1.7%
1960	4,185		−17.6%
1970	3,311		−20.9%
1980	3,029		−8.5%
1990	2,206		−27.2%
2000	1,630		−26.1%
2010	1,779		9.1%
2020	1,439		−19.1%
2021 (est.)	1,400		−2.7%
U.S. Decennial Census

=== 2020 census ===
As of the 2020 census, Logan had a population of 1,439. The median age was 42.1 years. 20.7% of residents were under the age of 18 and 17.6% of residents were 65 years of age or older. For every 100 females there were 87.9 males, and for every 100 females age 18 and over there were 84.3 males age 18 and over.

96.2% of residents lived in urban areas, while 3.8% lived in rural areas.

There were 629 households in Logan, of which 23.4% had children under the age of 18 living in them. Of all households, 31.3% were married-couple households, 23.1% were households with a male householder and no spouse or partner present, and 36.4% were households with a female householder and no spouse or partner present. About 35.1% of all households were made up of individuals and 13.9% had someone living alone who was 65 years of age or older.

There were 785 housing units, of which 19.9% were vacant. The homeowner vacancy rate was 1.0% and the rental vacancy rate was 20.2%.

Racial composition as of the 2020 census
Race	Number	Percent
White	1,263	87.8%
Black or African American	82	5.7%
American Indian and Alaska Native	4	0.3%
Asian	1	0.1%
Native Hawaiian and Other Pacific Islander	0	0.0%
Some other race	2	0.1%
Two or more races	87	6.0%
Hispanic or Latino (of any race)	17	1.2%

=== 2010 census ===
As of the census of 2010, there were 1,779 people, 808 households, and 469 families living in the city. The population density was 1,547.0 inhabitants per square mile (597.3/km^{2}). There were 1,016 housing units at an average density of 883.5 units per square mile (341.1 units/km^{2}). The racial makeup of the city was 91.6% White, 5.2% African American, 0.3% Native American, 0.7% Asian, 0.2% from other races, and 2.0% from two or more races. Hispanic or Latino of any race were 2.0% of the population.

There were 808 households, of which 26.4% had children under the age of 18 living with them, 36.8% were married couples living together, 15.7% had a female householder with no husband present, 5.6% had a male householder with no wife present, and 42.0% were non-families. 37.0% of all households were made up of individuals, and 13.6% had someone living alone who was 65 years of age or older. The average household size was 2.20 and the average family size was 2.85.

The median age in the city was 40.4 years. 20.2% of residents were under the age of 18; 9.4% were between the ages of 18 and 24; 26.3% were from 25 to 44; 28.1% were from 45 to 64; and 15.8% were 65 years of age or older. The gender makeup of the city was 47.4% male and 52.6% female.

=== 2000 census ===
As of the census of 2000, there were 1,630 people, 750 households, and 423 families living in the city. The population density was 1,403.5 people per square mile (541.9 people/km^{2}). There were 965 housing units at an average density of 830.9 units per square mile (320.8 units/km^{2}). The racial makeup of the city was 92.52% White, 4.79% African American, 0.31% Native American, 0.61% Asian, 0.06% from other races, and 1.72% from two or more races. Hispanic or Latino of any race were 0.80% of the population.

There were 750 households, out of which 20.9% had children under the age of 18 living with them, 38.3% were married couples living together, 13.2% had a female householder with no husband present, and 43.6% were non-families. 40.7% of all households were made up of individuals, and 18.9% had someone living alone who was 65 years of age or older. The average household size was 2.08 and the average family size was 2.78.

In the city, the population was spread out, with 16.8% under the age of 18, 8.5% from 18 to 24, 26.2% from 25 to 44, 26.7% from 45 to 64, and 21.8% who were 65 years of age or older. The median age was 44 years. For every 100 females, there were 82.3 males. For every 100 females age 18 and over, there were 79.1 males.

The median income for a household in the city was $22,623, and the median income for a family was $26,354. Males had a median income of $26,350 versus $19,167 for females. The per capita income for the city was $15,913. About 18.2% of families and 20.7% of the population were below the poverty line, including 29.0% of those under age 18 and 9.7% of those age 65 or over.

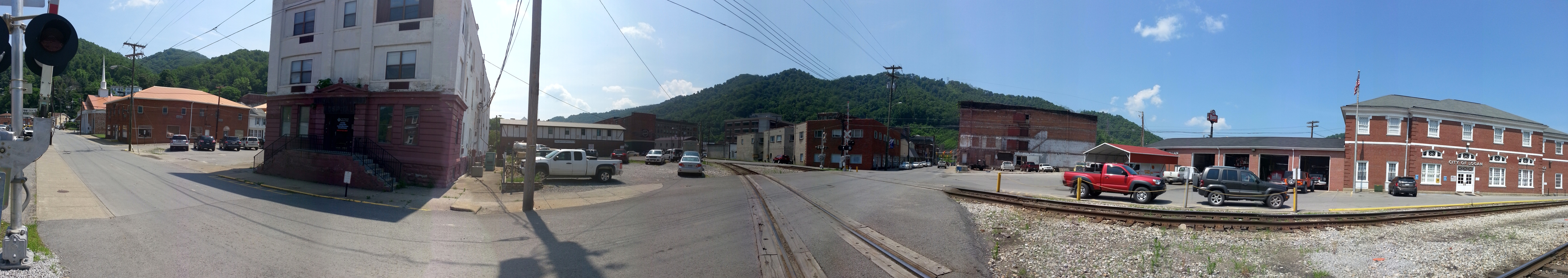
Logan in 2014

== Education ==
Logan is served by Logan High School, grades 9–12.

== Media ==
- The Logan Banner is published each Wednesday.
- WVOW, a local ABC radio affiliate.

== Notable people ==
- Michael Ammar, magician
- Stevie Browning, former shooting guard for Ovarense Basquetebol
- Shane Burton, retired defensive tackle for four NFL teams
- Harry Bushkar, former three-sport star at Virginia Tech Hokies
- Don Chafin, sheriff of Logan County during the "armed march" or Battle of Blair Mountain
- Thomas Dunn English, mayor and poet
- Joanne Dru, film and television actress
- Danny Godby, former MLB Outfielder
- Jack Harris, radio and television broadcast personality
- Devil Anse Hatfield, patriarch of the Hatfield family during the famous Hatfield & McCoy feud
- Dana Kirk, former College basketball coach
- Frankie Zoly Molnar, recipient of Congressional Medal of Honor for his actions in the Vietnam War
- Landau Eugene Murphy Jr., traditional pop singer and winner in the sixth season of America's Got Talent
- Richard Ojeda, U.S. Representative-elect from North Carolina's 9th congressional district, former West Virginia state senator representing the 7th district
- Lea Ann Parsley, Winter Olympics skeleton racing silver medalist
- Mamie Thurman, murder victim
- Walt Walowac, former professional basketball player, West Virginia Sports Hall of Fame
- Mark Workman, former first overall pick in the 1952 NBA draft, by the Milwaukee Hawks
