= Peach Creek =

Peach Creek may refer to:

- Cities:
  - Peach Creek, a fictional town, the setting of Ed, Edd n Eddy
  - Peach Creek, West Virginia, a town in West Virginia, United States
- Rivers:
  - Peach Creek (Grindstone Creek), a stream in Missouri
  - Peach Creek (White Cloud Creek tributary), a stream in Missouri
  - Peach Creek (Guadalupe River), a part of the Guadalupe River in Texas
  - Peach Creek (San Jacinto River), a part of the San Jacinto River in Texas
  - Peach Creek (West Virginia), a stream in West Virginia
