= Hetzel =

Hetzel may refer to:

- Hetzel (surname)
- Hetzel, West Virginia
- The Hetzel Union Building, the student union building of Pennsylvania State University
- The ACCO Brands brand for Office equipment and accessories
