= Fort Branch (disambiguation) =

Fort Branch may refer to:

- Fort Branch, a Confederate fort
- Fort Branch, Indiana, a town in Gibson County
- Fort Branch (Missouri), a stream in Missouri
- Fort Branch, West Virginia, an unincorporated community in Logan County
