= Sunbeam (disambiguation) =

A sunbeam is a beam of sunlight.

Sunbeam may also refer to:

== Arts and entertainment ==
- Sunbeam (album), by The Emotions, 1978
- Sunbeam (band), a German electronic band
- "Sunbeam", a 2020 song by Kian
- Ponygon and Kafk Sunbeam, characters in Zatch Bell!
- The Sunbeam, a 1912 American film

== Businesses and organisations ==
- Sunbeam Australia, a former home appliance manufacturer
- Sunbeam Bread, a franchised brand of white bread
- Sunbeam Cycles, a British brand of cycles, bicycles and motorcycles by John Marston Limited
- Sunbeam Motor Car Company, British automobile manufacturer
- Sunbeam Products, an American home appliance manufacturer
- Sunbeam-Talbot, a British sporting car manufacturer 1938–1954
- Sunbeam Television, an American broadcasting company

== Places ==
- Sunbeam, Colorado, U.S.
- Sunbeam, Illinois, U.S.
- Sunbeam, West Virginia, U.S.

== Transportation ==
- Chrysler Sunbeam, later Talbot Sunbeam, a 1977–1981 hatchback automobile
- Sunbeam S7 and S8, British motorcycles
- Triumph Tigress/BSA Sunbeam, a motor scooter
- Sunbeam 1000 hp, land speed record-breaking car
- Sunbeam, a GWR Sun Class locomotive
- Sunbeam (passenger train), between Houston and Dallas 1925–1955
- Sunbeam (steam yacht), launched 1874
- USS Sunbeam III, a U.S. Navy patrol vessel 1917–1919

== Other uses ==
- Operation Sunbeam, four nuclear tests at Nevada Test Site in 1962
- Curetis, a genus of butterflies called sunbeams
- Aglaeactis, a genus of hummingbirds called sunbeams
- Yohkoh (Japanese, 'sunbeam'), a solar observing space probe

== See also ==
- Beam (disambiguation)
- Xenopeltis, or sunbeam snakes
