= Dogpatch (disambiguation) =

Dogpatch was the setting of the comic Li'l Abner

Dogpatch and Dog Patch may refer to:

- Dogpatch, San Francisco, California, US, a neighborhood
- Dogpatch USA, a defunct theme park in Arkansas, US
- Dogpatch, a former name of Marble Falls, Arkansas, US
- Dog Patch, West Virginia, US

== Other uses ==
- Dogpatch § Other uses
