= Mount Gay-Shamrock, West Virginia =

- Census-designated place
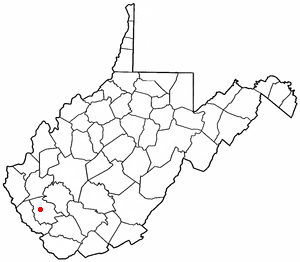
- Location of Mount Gay-Shamrock, West Virginia
- Coordinates: 37°50′45″N 82°0′52″W
- Country: United States
- State: West Virginia
- County: Logan

Area
  - Total: 7.56 sq mi (19.58 km^{2})
  - Land: 7.55 sq mi (19.55 km^{2})
  - Water: 0.012 sq mi (0.03 km^{2})
- Elevation: 668 ft (204 m)

Population (2010)
  - Total: 1,779
  - Density: 240/sq mi (91/km^{2})
- Time zone: UTC-5 (Eastern (EST))
  - Summer (DST): UTC-4 (EDT)
- ZIP Codes: 25637 (Mount Gay); 25601 (Logan)
- Area code: 304
- FIPS code: 54-56342
- GNIS feature ID: 2389511

Mount Gay-Shamrock is a census-designated place (CDP) in Logan County, West Virginia, United States.

Mount Gay-Shamrock has a 2020 population of 1,360. Mount Gay-Shamrock is currently declining at a rate of -2.51% annually. The population was 1,779 at the 2010 census.

The CDP includes the unincorporated communities of Mount Gay, Shamrock, Black Bottom, Whites Addition, Lintz Addition, Thompson Town, Hedgeview, Ridgeview, Logan Heights, Cora, and Whitman Junction.

A post office was established as Mount Gay in 1916.

== Geography ==
Mount Gay-Shamrock is located in west-central Logan County, with the village of Mount Gay in the eastern part of the CDP at the confluence of Island Creek and the Copperas Mine Fork, and the village of Shamrock just to the west in the valley of the Copperas Mine Fork. Settlements in the CDP run south up the valley of Island Creek, southwest up the valley of the Copperas Mine Fork, and west up the valley of the Mud Fork. The CDP is bordered to the east by the city of Logan, the county seat, and to the west by U.S. Route 119, a four-lane freeway which separates Mount Gay-Shamrock from Verdunville.

West Virginia Route 73 is the main road through the CDP, following the valley of the Mud Fork and connecting US-119 to the west with Logan to the east. West Virginia Route 44 leads south from Mount Gay up the valley of Island Creek. Old US Highway 119 runs up the valley of the Copperas Mine Fork, joining current US-119 at Holden.

According to the United States Census Bureau, the CDP has a total area of 7.6 square miles (19.6 km^{2}), of which 0.01 square miles (0.03 km^{2}), or 0.15%, are water. The entire CDP is part of the Island Creek watershed, feeding the Guyandotte River in Logan and thence leading north to the Ohio River.

== Demographics ==
As of the census of 2000, there were 2,623 people, 1,065 households, and 726 families living in the CDP. The population density was 219.3 people per square mile (84.7/km^{2}). There were 1,216 housing units at an average density of 101.6/sq mi (39.3/km^{2}). The racial makeup of the CDP was 90.43% White, 8.27% African American, 0.30% Native American, 0.11% Asian, 0.04% Pacific Islander, 0.15% from other races, and 0.69% from two or more races. Hispanic or Latino of any race were 0.38% of the population.

There were 1,065 households, out of which 27.9% had children under the age of 18 living with them, 48.2% were married couples living together, 14.9% had a female householder with no husband present, and 31.8% were non-families. 28.6% of all households were made up of individuals, and 11.2% had someone living alone who was 65 years of age or older. The average household size was 2.46 and the average family size was 3.02.

In the CDP, the population was spread out, with 22.6% under the age of 18, 9.2% from 18 to 24, 27.7% from 25 to 44, 26.5% from 45 to 64, and 14.0% who were 65 years of age or older. The median age was 40 years. For every 100 females, there were 96.0 males. For every 100 females age 18 and over, there were 90.5 males.

The median income for a household in the CDP was $18,975, and the median income for a family was $22,946. Males had a median income of $21,328 versus $23,021 for females. The per capita income for the CDP was $12,532. About 29.3% of families and 34.2% of the population were below the poverty line, including 49.0% of those under age 18 and 29.0% of those age 65 or over.
