= Copperas Mine Fork =

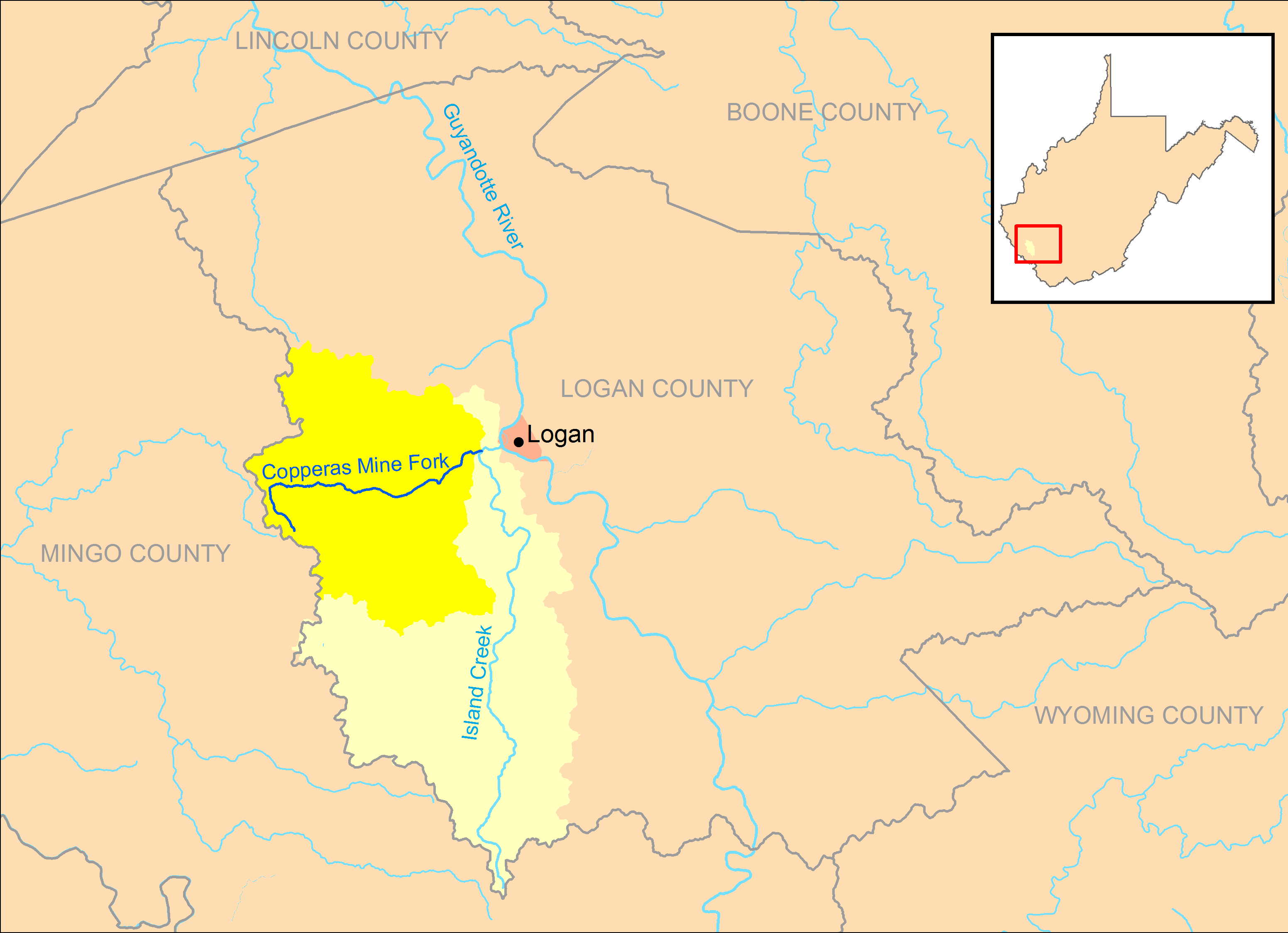
- Copperas Mine Fork and its watershed, highlighted within the larger Island Creek watershed in Logan County, West Virginia.

Location
- Country: United States
- State: West Virginia
- County: Logan

Physical characteristics
- Source
  - location: western Logan County
  - coordinates: 37°49′48″N 82°07′29″W
  - elevation: 1,413 ft (431 m)
- Mouth: Island Creek
  - location: Mount Gay
  - coordinates: 37°50′30.1″N 82°00′30.1″W
  - elevation: 667 ft (203 m)
- Length: 9.3 mi (15.0 km)
- Basin size: 45.4 sq mi (118 km^{2})

Copperas Mine Fork is a tributary of Island Creek, 9.3 miles (15.0 km) long, in southern West Virginia in the United States. Via Island Creek and the Guyandotte and Ohio rivers, it is part of the watershed of the Mississippi River, draining an area of 45.4 square miles (118 km^{2}) in a rural area on the unglaciated portion of the Allegheny Plateau, in the Logan Coalfield. The Copperas Mine Fork's entire course and drainage area are in Logan County.

The Copperas Mine Fork rises in western Logan County, along its boundary with Mingo County, and flows generally eastward through the unincorporated communities of Sulphur Springs, Beebe, Holden, and Cora, to Mount Gay, where it flows into Island Creek from the west, approximately 1 mile (1.6 km) west of the city of Logan.

== See also ==
- List of rivers of West Virginia
