= Crooked Creek, West Virginia =

Unincorporated community in West Virginia, United States

- Census-designated place
- Location within West Virginia Location within the United States
- Coordinates: 37°52′55″N 81°58′52″W
- Country: United States
- State: West Virginia
- County: Logan

Area
  - Total: 0.57 sq mi (1.47 km^{2})
  - Land: 0.57 sq mi (1.47 km^{2})
  - Water: 0 sq mi (0.0 km^{2})
- Elevation: 689 ft (210 m)

Population (2020)
  - Total: 273
  - Density: 481/sq mi (186/km^{2})
- Time zone: UTC-5 (Eastern (EST))
  - Summer (DST): UTC-4 (EDT)
- ZIP code: 25639 (Peach Creek)
- GNIS ID: 1554226
- FIPS code: 54-19060

Crooked Creek is an unincorporated community and census-designated place (CDP) in Logan County, West Virginia, United States. The CDP was first drawn for the 2020 census, in which the population was 273.

Crooked Creek is in central Logan County, in the valley of its namesake creek, a west-flowing tributary of the Guyandotte River. The community is bordered to the south by Peach Creek, in the valley of its own namesake creek. Crooked Creek is 3 miles (5 km) north of Logan, the county seat.

According to the U.S. Census Bureau, the Crooked Creek CDP has an area of 0.58 square miles (1.5 km^{2}), all land.
