= West Logan, West Virginia =

- Town
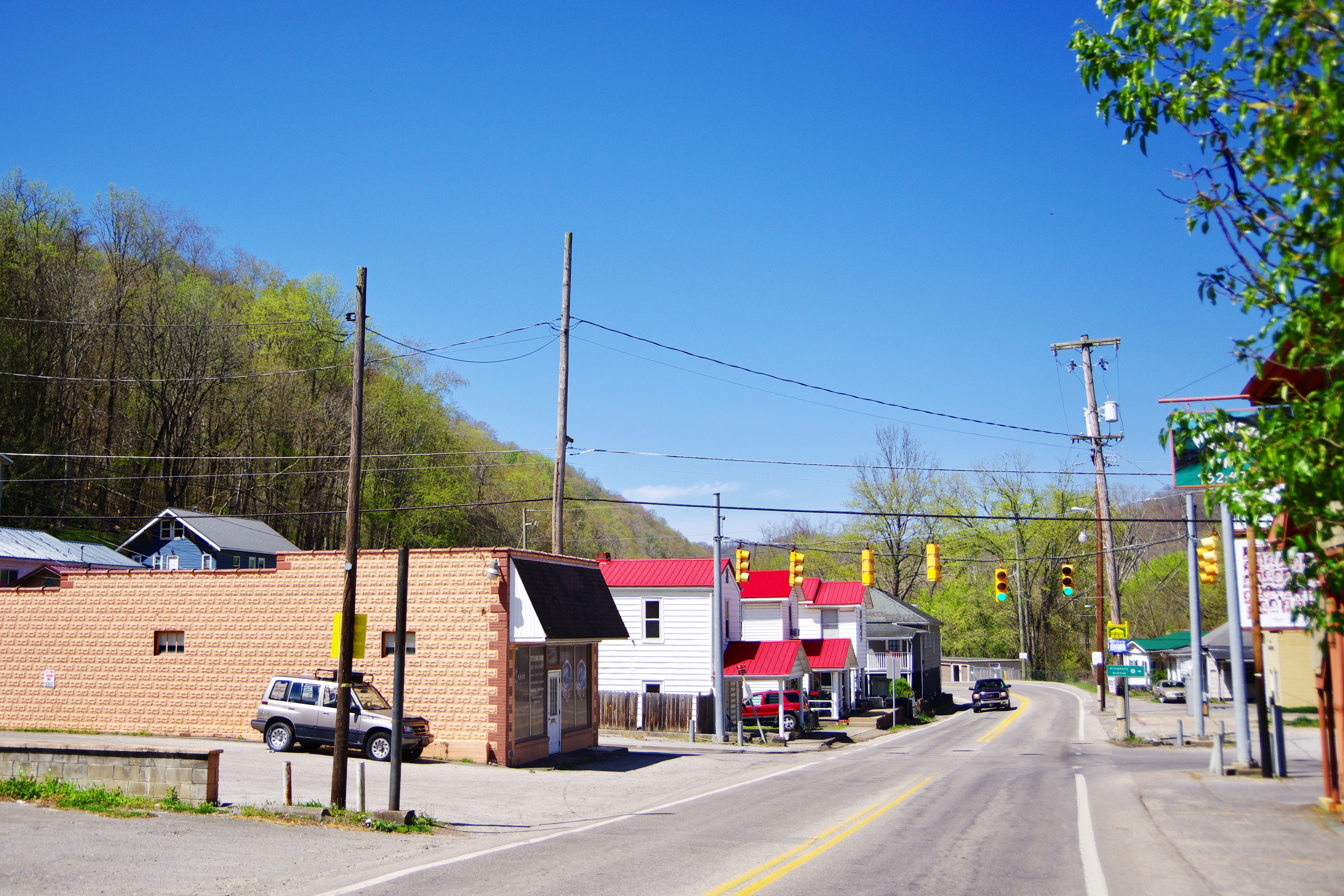
- West Virginia Route 10 (Old Logan Road) in West Logan, April 2018

- Location of West Logan in Logan County, West Virginia
- Coordinates: 37°52′10″N 81°59′14″W
- Country: United States
- State: West Virginia
- County: Logan
- Incorporated: November 6, 1950

Area
  - Total: 0.34 sq mi (0.87 km^{2})
  - Land: 0.34 sq mi (0.87 km^{2})
  - Water: 0 sq mi (0.00 km^{2})
- Elevation: 682 ft (208 m)

Population (2020)
  - Total: 399
  - Estimate (2021): 391
  - Density: 1,078.3/sq mi (416.35/km^{2})
- Time zone: UTC-5 (Eastern (EST))
  - Summer (DST): UTC-4 (EDT)
- ZIP code: 25601
- Area code: 304
- FIPS code: 54-85900
- GNIS feature ID: 1555948

West Logan is a town along the Guyandotte River in Logan County, West Virginia, United States. The population was 400 at the 2020 census. For unknown reasons, some sources report West Logan to lay west of the county seat at Logan, attributing to this fact the name.

== Geography ==
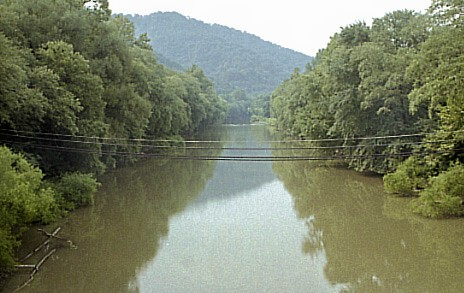
The Guyandotte River at West Logan, July 1996

West Logan is located at 37°52′10″N 81°59′14″W (37.869557, -81.987282). The town primarily occupies bottomland along the west bank of the Guyandotte River, though its municipal boundaries stretch westward to the summit of Rattlesnake Knob. The community of Peach Creek lies across the river to the northeast, and the community of Aracoma lies to the southwest.

West Virginia Route 10 (2nd Avenue) traverses West Logan, connecting the town with Logan to the southeast and Mitchell Heights and Chapmanville to the north. A bridge along Old Guyan River Road crosses the Guyandotte River and provides access to the Peach Creek area.

According to the United States Census Bureau, the town has a total area of 0.34 square miles (0.88 km^{2}), all land.

== Demographics ==
Historical population
Census	Pop.	Note	%±
1960	855		—
1970	685		−19.9%
1980	630		−8.0%
1990	524		−16.8%
2000	418		−20.2%
2010	424		1.4%
2020	399		−5.9%
2021 (est.)	391	▼	−2.0%
U.S. Decennial Census

=== 2010 census ===
As of the census of 2010, there were 424 people, 188 households, and 109 families living in the town. The population density was 1,247.1 inhabitants per square mile (481.5/km^{2}). There were 221 housing units at an average density of 650.0 per square mile (251.0/km^{2}). The racial makeup of the town was 97.4% White, 0.2% African American, 0.9% Asian, and 1.4% from two or more races.

There were 188 households, of which 27.7% had children under the age of 18 living with them, 37.8% were married couples living together, 14.4% had a female householder with no husband present, 5.9% had a male householder with no wife present, and 42.0% were non-families. 38.3% of all households were made up of individuals, and 18.7% had someone living alone who was 65 years of age or older. The average household size was 2.26 and the average family size was 2.99.

The median age in the town was 38.8 years. 21.7% of residents were under the age of 18; 8.8% were between the ages of 18 and 24; 26.9% were from 25 to 44; 24.8% were from 45 to 64; and 17.9% were 65 years of age or older. The gender makeup of the town was 46.2% male and 53.8% female.

=== 2000 census ===
As of the census of 2000, there were 418 people, 186 households, and 124 families living in the town. The population density was 1,236.6 inhabitants per square mile (474.7/km^{2}). There were 228 housing units at an average density of 674.5 per square mile (258.9/km^{2}). The racial makeup of the town was 97.13% White, 1.67% African American, 0.72% Native American, 0.24% Asian, and 0.24% from two or more races.

There were 186 households, out of which 21.5% had children under the age of 18 living with them, 52.7% were married couples living together, 11.3% had a female householder with no husband present, and 33.3% were non-families. 30.6% of all households were made up of individuals, and 18.3% had someone living alone who was 65 years of age or older. The average household size was 2.25 and the average family size was 2.82.

In the town, the population was spread out, with 20.6% under the age of 18, 5.0% from 18 to 24, 22.2% from 25 to 44, 27.5% from 45 to 64, and 24.6% who were 65 years of age or older. The median age was 46 years. For every 100 females, there were 85.0 males. For every 100 females age 18 and over, there were 83.4 males.

The median income for a household in the town was $23,500, and the median income for a family was $30,833. Males had a median income of $28,125 versus $22,917 for females. The per capita income for the town was $13,567. About 21.3% of families and 22.0% of the population were below the poverty line, including 29.7% of those under age 18 and 12.5% of those age 65 or over.

== See also ==
- List of towns in West Virginia
