= Spruce Valley =

Spruce Valley may refer to:

- Spruce Valley, Alberta
- Spruce Valley Township, Marshall County, Minnesota
- Spruce Valley, West Virginia
