= Walnut Hill =

Walnut Hill is the name of several locations in the United States:

Settlements

- Walnut Hill, Florida, a community in northern Escambia County, Florida
- Walnut Hill, Illinois, a village
- Walnut Hill, Medford, Massachusetts, a neighborhood
- Walnut Hill (Omaha), an historic neighborhood in Omaha, Nebraska
- Walnut Hill, Philadelphia, Pennsylvania, a neighborhood
- Walnut Hill, Tennessee, a census-designated place
- Walnut Hill, West Virginia, an unincorporated community

Other uses

- Walnut Hill (Lynchburg, Virginia), a historic house
- Walnut Hill School, an arts-focused private school in Natick, Massachusetts
- Walnut Hill station (disambiguation), stations of the name

== See also ==
- Walnut Hills (disambiguation)
- Walnut Hall
- Walnut Hall (Durham, North Carolina)
