= Troy Town (disambiguation) =

Troy town or Troytown refers to the real or legendary Greek city of Troy in present-day Turkey.

It may also refer to:

- Troy Town, a name for various turf mazes in England
- Troy Town, West Virginia, an unincorporated community in Logan County, United States
- Troytown (horse), an Irish racehorse
- The Astonishing History of Troy Town, a novel by Arthur Quiller-Couch

== See also ==
- Troy township (disambiguation)
