= Oilville =

Oilville may refer to:

- Oilville, Virginia, an unincorporated community in Goochland County
- Oilville, West Virginia, an unincorporated community in Logan County
