= Elk Creek Wildlife Management Area =

State Wildlife Management Area in Logan and Mingo counties, West Virginia

- Location within West Virginia
- Location: West Virginia, United States
- Coordinates: 37°40′39″N 81°50′19″W
- Area: 6,004 acres (24.30 km^{2})
- Elevation: 830 ft (250 m)
- Established: 2008
- Operator: West Virginia Division of Natural Resources, Wildlife Resources Section
- Website: WVDNR District 5 Wildlife Management Areas

Elk Creek Wildlife Management Area is located on 6,004 acres (2,430 ha) east of Wylo in Logan and Mingo counties, West Virginia. The wildlife management area was established in 2008 on land leased by the West Virginia Division of Natural Resources from Heartwood Forestland Fund II, L.P.

== See also ==
- Animal conservation
- Fishing
- Hunting
- List of West Virginia wildlife management areas
