= Gloria Ann Taylor =

American soul singer (1944–2017)

Background information
- Also known as: Gloria Taylor
- Born: September 13, 1944; Dehue, West Virginia, U.S.
- Died: December 8, 2017 (aged 73) Toledo, Ohio, U.S.
- Genres: Soul, funk
- Occupation: Singer
- Years active: c.1966–1977
- Labels: King Soul, Silver Fox, Columbia, Mercury, Selector Sound, Ubiquity

Gloria Ann Taylor (September 13, 1944 – December 8, 2017), sometimes credited as Gloria Taylor, was an American R&B and soul singer. Her biggest hit was "You Got to Pay the Price" in 1969, and her early 1970s recordings with producer and husband Walter Whisenhunt became sought-after rare grooves before being reissued in the 2010s.

== Biography ==
She was born in Dehue, West Virginia, and moved to Toledo, Ohio at the age of two with her mother and siblings. As a child, she had rheumatic fever, and was not expected to live to adulthood. She studied at Feilbach School for Crippled Children and Woodward High School. After her mother died when Gloria was in her teens, she began singing in clubs in Toledo in the early 1960s to make money to support her own young children. While performing at the Green Light club, she was discovered by Walter Whisenhunt, who had worked as a promoter and production manager with James Brown and been involved in making Doris Troy's hit "Just One Look".

Whisenhunt became her manager and record producer, and the pair soon married. Taylor's brother Leonard was a songwriter and musician who also assisted with the arrangements and production. Her first records (as Gloria Taylor) were issued on the King Soul label in Detroit, before she had her first and biggest chart success with "You Got to Pay the Price", released on Shelby Singleton's Silver Fox label. The record reached No. 9 on the Billboard R&B chart and No. 49 on the pop chart in late 1969, and was nominated for a Grammy Award for Best Female R&B Vocal Performance, won that year by Aretha Franklin. The follow-up, "Grounded", reached No. 43 on the R&B chart the following year.

Taylor and Whisenhunt moved to California, and recorded for Columbia Records. Taylor had her third chart hit in 1974 with "Deep Inside You", which reached No. 96 on the R&B chart. However, later in the 1970s Whisenhunt terminated Taylor's links with Columbia on the grounds that they were not releasing enough of her records, a decision that Taylor later regretted, saying "the worst thing he could have done was take me off CBS." She signed for Mercury Records, before Whisenhunt started his own label Selector Sound, on which Taylor's recordings (on which she was credited as Gloria Ann Taylor) were issued. These included "Love Is A Hurtin' Thing" and a funk version of Dolly Parton's "Jolene".

Taylor's records were later characterized as "a unique musical brew that mixed northern soul with exotic percussion and fuzzy psychedelic guitars.... [in] a range of tempos and stylings from ballads to disco." Another critic said that "Whisenhunt challenged Taylor with adventurous song choices. He was a daring innovator, spiking his opulent productions with grimy, psychedelic guitars; meticulously layering harmonies, strings, and vocal harmonies for a singular wall-of-sound approach; leaving in rhythmic clashes and stray tape noise to seemingly heighten drama; and boldly experimenting with vocal effects." However, the records were not successful at the time, and by 1977 Taylor's career had stalled, and the couple's marriage failed.

Taylor returned to Toledo to raise her children, found other work, and sang only in her church, never recording or performing professionally again. However, over the years some of her recordings became highly sought after by collectors of rare groove soul and funk music. In 2015, after several years of negotiations, Ubiquity Records reissued many of her recordings on CD and vinyl as Love Is A Hurtin' Thing, and Taylor announced her intention to return to performing.

Taylor died on December 8, 2017, at age 73.
