= Logan Heights =

Logan Heights may refer to:

- Logan Heights, San Diego
  - Logan Heights Gang, a street gang in San Diego
- Logan Heights, West Virginia
