= Thompsontown =

Thompsontown and Thompson Town may refer to:

- Thompsontown, Pennsylvania
- Thompson Town, West Virginia
