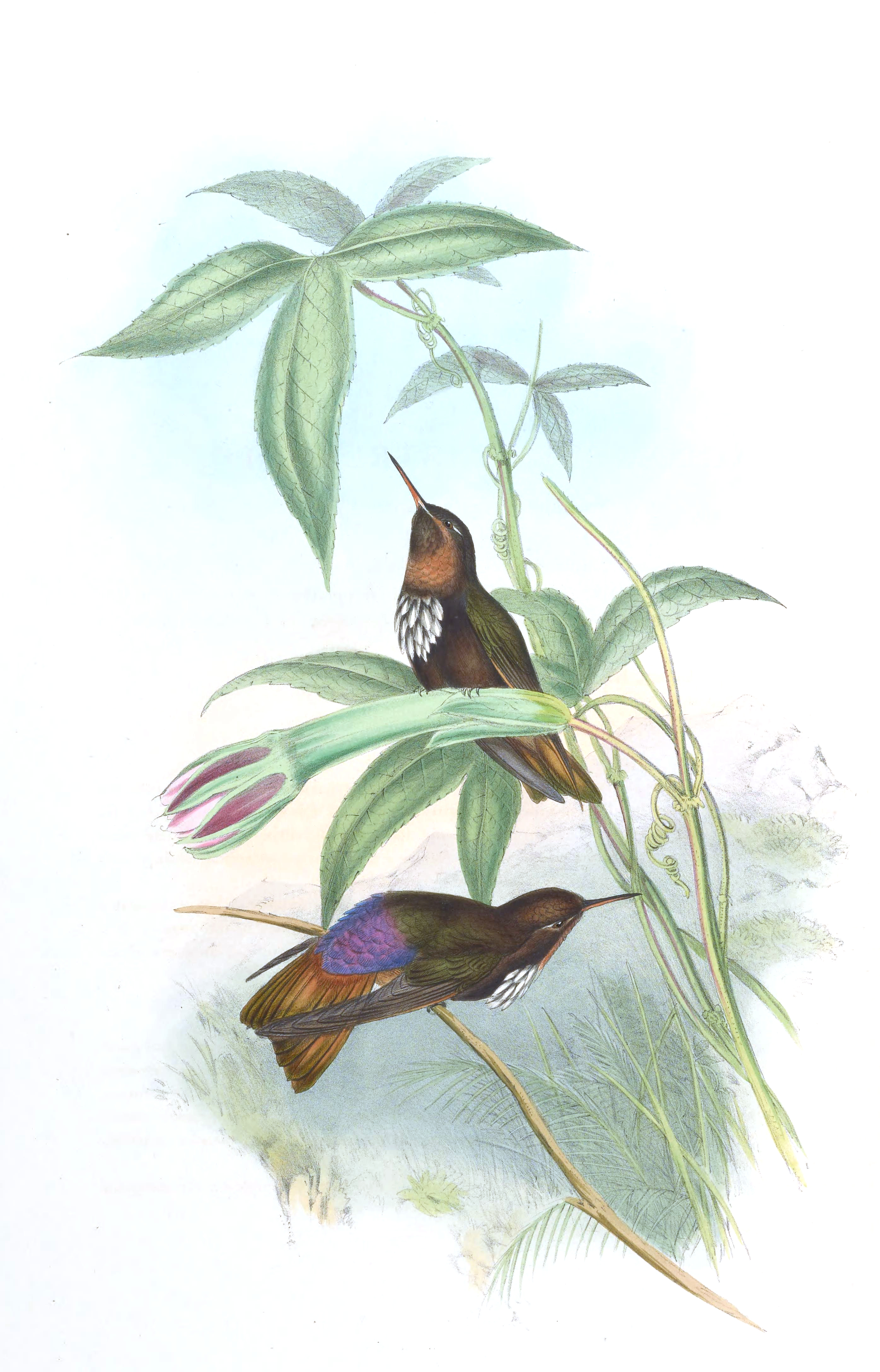
- Painting by John Gould, for A Monograph of the Trochilidae (Family of Hummingbirds)

Conservation status
- Near Threatened (IUCN 3.1)
- CITES Appendix II

Scientific classification
- Kingdom: Animalia
- Phylum: Chordata
- Class: Aves
- Order: Apodiformes
- Family: Trochilidae
- Genus: Aglaeactis
- Species: A. castelnaudii

Binomial name
- Aglaeactis castelnaudii (Bourcier & Mulsant, 1848)

= White-tufted sunbeam =

Species of bird

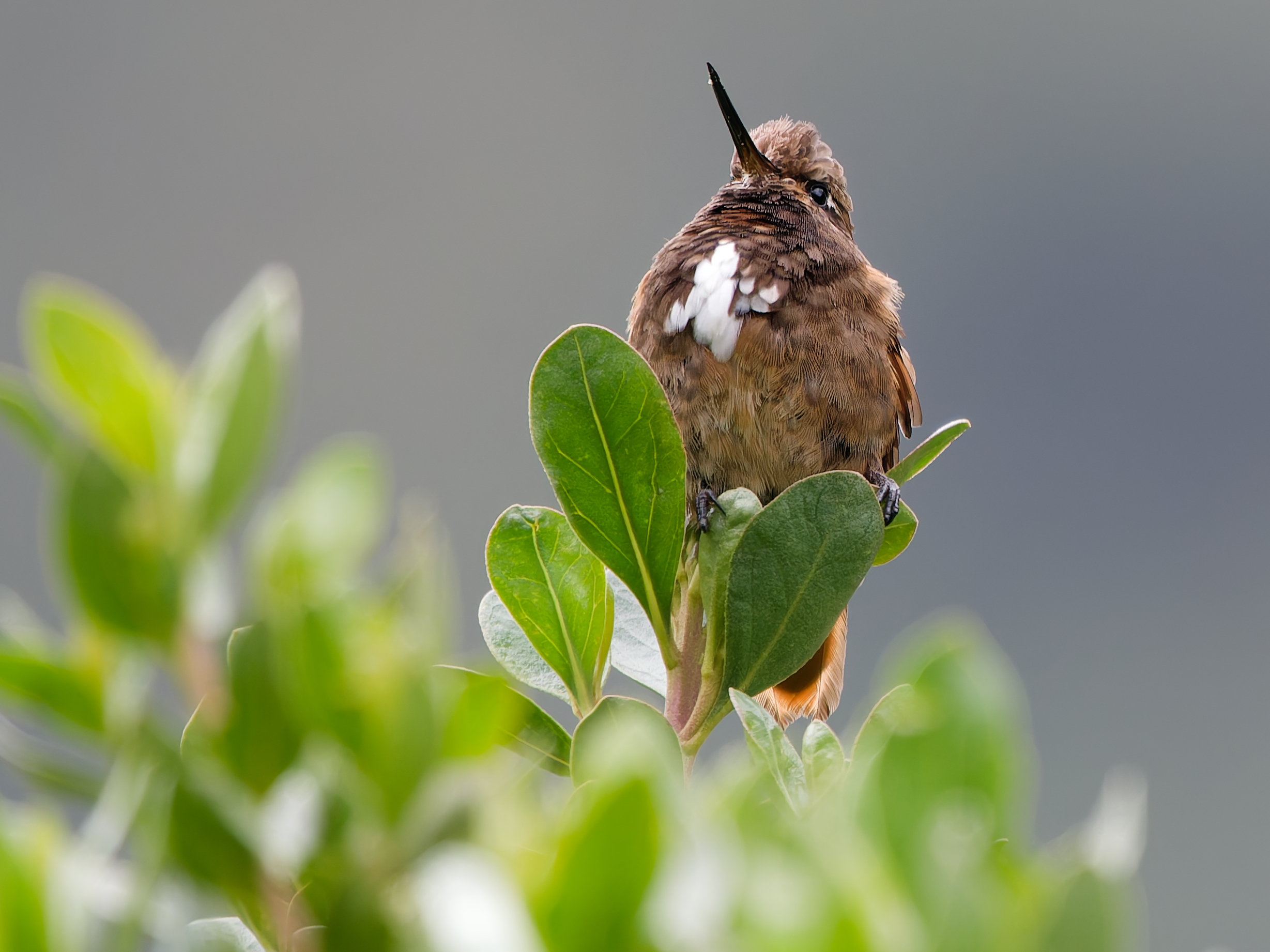
White-tufted Sunbeam

The white-tufted sunbeam (Aglaeactis castelnaudii) is a species of hummingbird in the family Trochilidae. It is found only in Peru. Its natural habitats are subtropical or tropical moist montane forest and subtropical or tropical high-altitude shrubland.

== Description ==
An adult white-tufted sunbeam is approximately 12 cm in height and weighs 7- 8.5 g. The bill is straight and black and there is a notable patch of white feathers directly under the chin on the breast. The rest of the body is described as tawny and darkly-colored. There are iridescent feathers on the back of the bird that are most noticeable in flight and while hovering. Males and females of the species exhibit subtle sexual dimorphism.

Males are fuscous-black on their upper backs with a magenta reflection on their rump and lower back. Their tails are forked. The belly, side, and neck of a male are dull brown. The throat and pectoral band are blackish in color. True to their name, there is a white feather tuft on the central breast. Females are very similar to males, but have a less iridescent back and a smaller tail fork.

Juvenile white-tufted sunbeams have a more uniform, brown exterior with no iridescent feathers.

== Habitat and range ==
The white-tufted sunbeam has a small and fragmented range, estimated at a maximum of 832 km^{2} (approximately 321 sq mi), cumulatively. This number was calculated using the remaining tree area in their range. The species has been observed to have a range that is not restricted to a specific number of locations (i.e. the range is fragmented). These hummingbirds reside in two main areas located in Central and Southern-Central Peru. They prefer drier parts of evergreen montane forests, intermontane valleys, and open shrub. White-tufted sunbeams can often be seen perching precariously at the very top of trees; except for where their range overlaps with Shining Sunbeams (Aglaeactis cupripennis). In these areas, they are often hidden away on lower branches and within dense vegetation.

== Vocalization ==
Like many hummingbirds, the white-tufted sunbeam has a very soft and inconspicuous call. Vocalizations include a repeated tzit call and, during chases, a twittering series of titi-tsreet-tsreet-tsreet sounds. The latter is used during hostile situations only. The white-tufted sunbeam can also emit a thin, high-pitched seeeuuu noise.

== Diet ==
Staples of this hummingbird's diet include flower nectar and insects. Some of the flowering plants utilized by this species include members of the following genera:

- Barnadesia
- Berberis
- Brachyotum
- Centropogon
- Labiatae
- Lupinus
- Salpichroa
- Siphocamplos

The white-tufted sunbeam is known for always clinging to flowers while it feeds and for catching insects in midair.

== Conservation status ==
This hummingbird's divided range meets the criterion of the IUCN (International Union for Conservation) Red List, and is therefore evaluated as near threatened. Despite a general agreement among researchers that this species has a declining population and fragmented range, it is not defined as vulnerable by the IUCN because the range is not considered severely fragmented.

While the hummingbird's exact population size is unknown, white-tufted sunbeams have been described as "common but patchily distributed." The suspected cause of population decline is ongoing habitat loss due to deforestation.
