= Sodom, West Virginia =

- Unincorporated community
- Location within West Virginia Location within the United States
- Coordinates: 37°54′59″N 81°49′59″W
- Country: United States
- State: West Virginia
- County: Logan
- Elevation: 866 ft (264 m)
- Time zone: UTC-5 (Eastern (EST))
  - Summer (DST): UTC-4 (EDT)
- GNIS ID: 1555659

Sodom is an unincorporated community in Logan County, West Virginia, United States.

The locality is outside Sharples. The terrain is hilly and steep, and the elevation of Sodom is 866 feet.
