= Five Block, West Virginia =

Unincorporated community in West Virginia, United States

- Unincorporated community
- Location within West Virginia Location within the United States
- Coordinates: 37°53′42″N 81°49′26″W
- Country: United States
- State: West Virginia
- County: Logan
- Elevation: 942 ft (287 m)
- Time zone: UTC-5 (Eastern (EST))
  - Summer (DST): UTC-4 (EDT)
- GNIS ID: 1539019

Five Block is an unincorporated community in Logan County, West Virginia, United States. It is named after the Five Block coal seam that runs through the area.
