= Ridgeview, Logan County, West Virginia =

Ridgeview, West Virginia
- Unincorporated community
- Location within West Virginia Location within the United States
- Coordinates: 37°50′36″N 82°00′58″W
- Country: United States
- State: West Virginia
- County: Logan
- Elevation: 728 ft (222 m)
- Time zone: UTC-5 (Eastern (EST))
  - Summer (DST): UTC-4 (EDT)
- Area codes: 304 & 681
- GNIS feature ID: 1555481

Ridgeview is an unincorporated community in Logan County, West Virginia, United States. Ridgeview is 1.5 miles (2.4 km) west of Logan. It is part of the Mount Gay-Shamrock census-designated place.
