= Wanda, West Virginia =

- Unincorporated community
- Location within West Virginia Location within the United States
- Coordinates: 37°51′31″N 81°55′40″W
- Country: United States
- State: West Virginia
- County: Logan
- Elevation: 760 ft (230 m)
- Time zone: UTC-5 (Eastern (EST))
  - Summer (DST): UTC-4 (EDT)
- GNIS ID: 1548779

Wanda is an unincorporated community in Logan County, West Virginia, United States. It is 760 feet [230 m] above sea level. and runs on the EST time zone (UTC−5). It has not been involved in any censuses, so its population is unknown/
