= Rum Junction, West Virginia =

- Unincorporated community
- Location within West Virginia Location within the United States
- Coordinates: 37°48′57″N 81°56′7″W
- Country: United States
- State: West Virginia
- County: Logan
- Elevation: 686 ft (209 m)
- Time zone: UTC-5 (Eastern (EST))
  - Summer (DST): UTC-4 (EDT)
- GNIS ID: 1555537

Rum Junction is an unincorporated community in Logan County, West Virginia, United States.

== Geography ==
Rum Junction is an unincorporated community in Logan County, West Virginia. It lies at an elevation of 686 feet (209 m) at 37°48′57″N 81°56′7″W.

The community is located in the unglaciated Allegheny Plateau of the Appalachian Mountains, in a landscape of forested ridges and narrow valleys drained by Rum Creek, a tributary of the Guyandotte River. Its geology is characteristic of the Appalachian coalfields of West Virginia.
