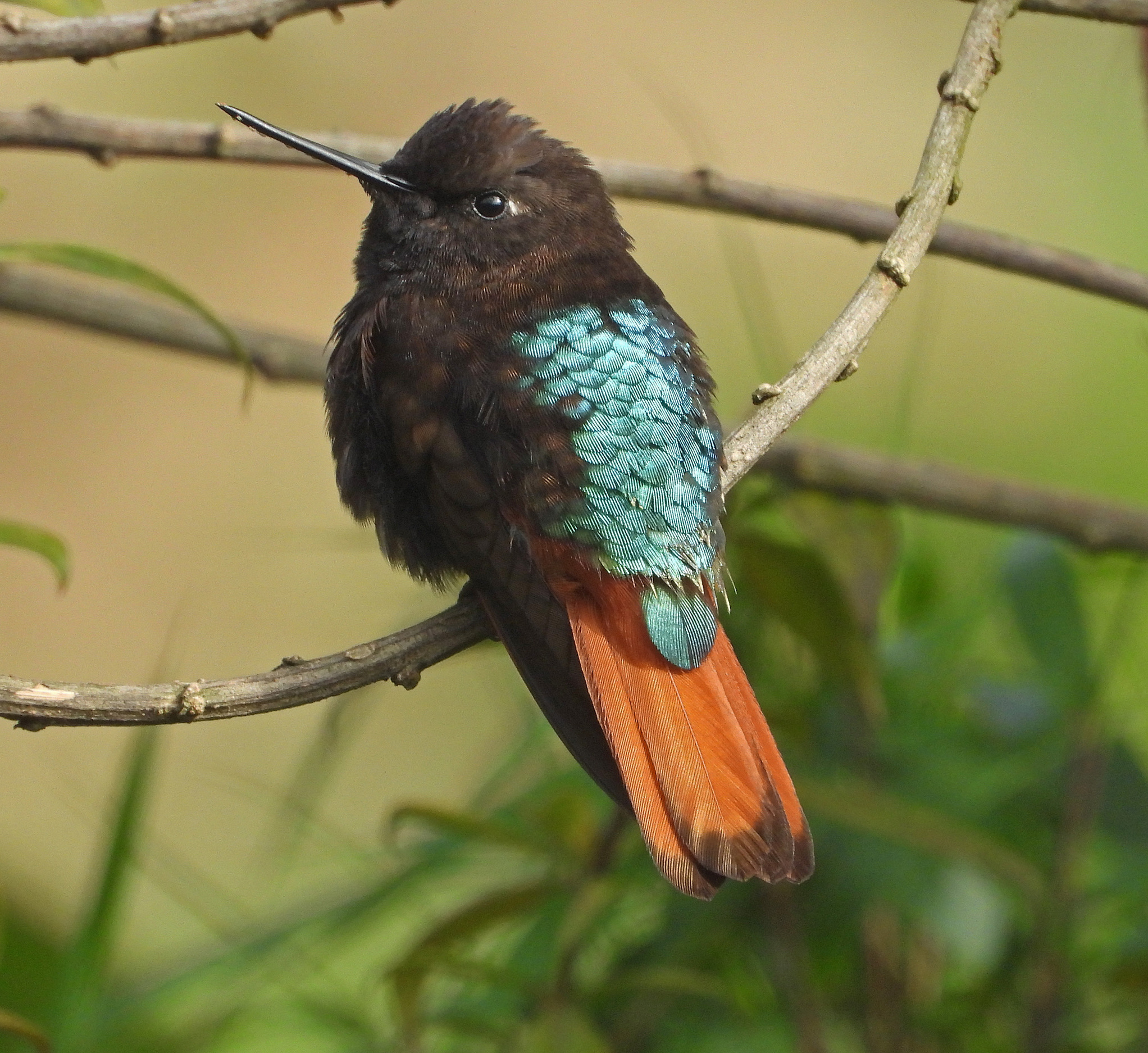

Conservation status
- Least Concern (IUCN 3.1)
- CITES Appendix II

Scientific classification
- Kingdom: Animalia
- Phylum: Chordata
- Class: Aves
- Order: Apodiformes
- Family: Trochilidae
- Genus: Aglaeactis
- Species: A. pamela

Binomial name
- Aglaeactis pamela (d'Orbigny, 1838)

= Black-hooded sunbeam =

Species of hummingbird

The black-hooded sunbeam (Aglaeactis pamela) is a species of hummingbird in the "brilliants", tribe Heliantheini in subfamily Lesbiinae. It is endemic to Bolivia.

== Taxonomy and systematics ==
The black-hooded sunbeam is monotypic.

== Description ==
The black-hooded sunbeam is about 12 cm (4.7 in) long including its 15 mm (0.59 in) straight black bill. Males weigh about 5.2 g (0.18 oz) and females 5.8 g (0.20 oz). The adult male is mostly purplish black, with glittering golden green to bluish green on the lower back and rump and a white tuft in the center of the breast. The tail is rufous with dusky tips to the feathers. Adult females are colored like the male but are duller overall and with less iridescent lower back and rump. Juveniles are somewhat browner than adults, with a reduced breast tuft and an olive cast to the tail.

== Distribution and habitat ==
The black-hooded sunbeam is found only in the Andes of northern Bolivia, mainly in the departments of La Paz and Cochabamba. In elevation it mostly ranges between 2,500 and 4,200 m (8,200 and 13,800 ft) but there are records as low as 1,800 m (5,900 ft). It inhabits cloud forest and humid to semihumid montane scrublands.

== Behavior ==
=== Movement ===
The black-hooded sunbeam is believed to be sedentary but might make seasonal elevational movements.

=== Feeding ===
The black-hooded sunbeam feeds primarily on nectar; it forages at all levels and clings to flowers to feed rather than hovering. It also feeds on small arthropods.

=== Breeding ===
The black-hooded sunbeam's breeding season is thought to span from September to March. Its breeding phenology, nest, and eggs have not been described.

=== Vocalization ===
Though the black-hooded sunbeam's vocalizations are not well known, it has been reported giving a "high pitched zeet-zeet-zeet", and other calls during antagonistic encounters.

== Status ==
The IUCN has assessed the black-hooded sunbeam as being of Least Concern. Though it has a small range and its population size is not known, the latter appears to be stable. "At least in the short term, Black-hooded Sunbeam seems to be little affected by human activities".
