= Trace Junction, West Virginia =

- Unincorporated community
- Location within West Virginia Location within the United States
- Coordinates: 37°49′31″N 82°2′59″W
- Country: United States
- State: West Virginia
- County: Logan
- Elevation: 840 ft (260 m)
- Time zone: UTC-5 (Eastern (EST))
  - Summer (DST): UTC-4 (EDT)
- GNIS ID: 1555819

Trace Junction is an unincorporated community in Logan County in the U.S. state of West Virginia.
