= Landville, West Virginia =

- Unincorporated community
- Location within West Virginia Location within the United States
- Coordinates: 37°42′44″N 81°52′02″W
- Country: United States
- State: West Virginia
- County: Logan
- Elevation: 755 ft (230 m)
- Time zone: UTC-5 (Eastern (EST))
  - Summer (DST): UTC-4 (EDT)
- Area codes: 304 & 681
- GNIS feature ID: 1554909

Landville is an unincorporated community in Logan County, West Virginia, United States. Landville is located on the Guyandotte River and West Virginia Route 80, 2 miles (3.2 km) south-southeast of Man. Landville had a post office, which closed on July 9, 1988.

The community most likely derives its name from one Mr. Landstreet, a businessperson in the coal-mining industry.
