= Henlawson, West Virginia =

- Census-designated place
- Location within West Virginia Location within the United States
- Coordinates: 37°54′08″N 81°59′17″W
- Country: United States
- State: West Virginia
- County: Logan

Area
  - Total: 0.830 sq mi (2.15 km^{2})
  - Land: 0.802 sq mi (2.08 km^{2})
  - Water: 0.028 sq mi (0.073 km^{2})
- Elevation: 667 ft (203 m)

Population (2020)
  - Total: 353
  - Density: 440/sq mi (170/km^{2})
- Time zone: UTC-5 (Eastern (EST))
  - Summer (DST): UTC-4 (EDT)
- ZIP code: 25624
- Area codes: 304 & 681
- GNIS feature ID: 1540150
- FIPS code: 54-36484

Henlawson is a census-designated place (CDP) in Logan County, West Virginia, United States. Henlawson has a post office with ZIP code 25624. As of the 2020 census, its population was 353 (down from 442 at the 2010 census). Henlawson is believed to have been named after a resident, Henry Lawson. Merrill Coal Mines opened Merrill Mines here in 1921 and built homes to house the miners.

== Geography ==
Henlawson is located in north-central Logan County, on the east bank of the Guyandotte River across from Mitchell Heights to the north and Justice Addition to the southwest. It is 5 miles (8 km) north of Logan, the county seat.

According to the U.S. Census Bureau, the Henlawson CDP has a total area of 0.83 square miles (2.15 km^{2}), of which 0.80 square miles (2.08 km^{2}) are land and 0.027 square miles (0.07 km^{2}), or 3.35%, are water. The Guyandotte is a north-flowing tributary of the Ohio River.
