= Walnut Hills =

Walnut Hills may refer to:

- Walnut Hills, Cincinnati, a neighborhood
  - Walnut Hills High School
  - Walnut Hills Cemetery (Cincinnati)
  - Walnut Hills United Jewish Cemetery
  - Walnut Hills United Presbyterian Church
- Walnut Hills, Dayton, Ohio
- Walnut Hills (Mississippi), former name of Vicksburg, Mississippi (listed on the NRHP in Mississippi)
- Walnut Hills Cemetery (Brookline, Massachusetts) (listed on the NRHP in Massachusetts)

== See also ==
- Walnut Hill (disambiguation)
