= Rita, West Virginia =

- Unincorporated community
- Location within West Virginia Location within the United States
- Coordinates: 37°46′13″N 81°55′55″W
- Country: United States
- State: West Virginia
- County: Logan
- Elevation: 722 ft (220 m)
- Time zone: UTC-5 (Eastern (EST))
  - Summer (DST): UTC-4 (EDT)
- GNIS ID: 1558383

Rita is an unincorporated community and coal town in Logan County, West Virginia, United States.
