= Phico, West Virginia =

- Unincorporated community
- Location within West Virginia Location within the United States
- Coordinates: 37°57′02″N 82°00′50″W
- Country: United States
- State: West Virginia
- County: Logan
- Time zone: UTC-5 (Eastern (EST))
  - Summer (DST): UTC-4 (EDT)

Phico is a small unincorporated community just south of the town of Chapmanville on Route 10 in Logan County, West Virginia, United States.
