= Walnut Hill station =

Walnut Hill station may refer to:

- Walnut Hill station (SEPTA), a SEPTA Regional Rail station in Abington Township, Pennsylvania
- Walnut Hill station (DART), a DART Red Line station in Dallas, Texas
- Walnut Hill/Denton station, a DART Green line station in Dallas, Texas

== See also ==
- Walnut Hill (disambiguation)
