= Justice Addition, West Virginia =

- Census-designated place
- Location within West Virginia Location within the United States
- Coordinates: 37°53′33″N 81°59′34″W
- Country: United States
- State: West Virginia
- County: Logan

Area
  - Total: 0.12 sq mi (0.32 km^{2})
  - Land: 0.12 sq mi (0.30 km^{2})
  - Water: 0.0077 sq mi (0.02 km^{2})
- Elevation: 669 ft (204 m)

Population (2020)
  - Total: 331
- Time zone: UTC-5 (Eastern (EST))
  - Summer (DST): UTC-4 (EDT)
- ZIP code: 25601 (Logan)
- GNIS ID: 1554838
- Website: FIPS code

Justice Addition is an unincorporated community and census-designated place (CDP) in Logan County, West Virginia, United States. The community was first listed as a CDP prior to the 2020 census. The population was 331 at the 2020 census.

== Geography ==
Justice Addition is in north-central Logan County along West Virginia Route 10, 3 miles (5 km) north of Logan, the county seat, and 8 miles (13 km) south of Chapmanville. The CDP sits on the west bank of the Guyandotte River, a north-flowing tributary of the Ohio River. The community of Henlawson borders Justice Addition to the northeast, across the Guyandotte.

According to the U.S. Census Bureau, the Justice Addition CDP has a total area of 0.12 square miles (0.32 km^{2}), of which 0.01 square miles (0.02 km^{2}), or 6.43%, are water.
