= Beebe, West Virginia =

Unincorporated community in West Virginia, United States

- Unincorporated community
- Location within West Virginia Location within the United States
- Coordinates: 37°49′35″N 82°03′44″W
- Country: United States
- State: West Virginia
- County: Logan
- Elevation: 738 ft (225 m)
- Time zone: UTC-5 (Eastern (EST))
  - Summer (DST): UTC-4 (EDT)
- Area codes: 304 & 681
- GNIS feature ID: 1553834

Beebe is an unincorporated community in Logan County, West Virginia, United States. It is part of the Holden census-designated place. Beebe is located along Copperas Mine Fork and County Route 9/2, 4.1 miles (6.6 km) west-southwest of Logan.
