= Pecks Mill, West Virginia =

- Unincorporated community
- Location within West Virginia Location within the United States
- Coordinates: 37°50′40″N 82°03′18″W
- Country: United States
- State: West Virginia
- County: Logan
- Elevation: 692 ft (211 m)
- Time zone: UTC-5 (Eastern (EST))
  - Summer (DST): UTC-4 (EDT)
- ZIP code: 25547
- Area codes: 304 & 681
- GNIS feature ID: 1544680

Pecks Mill is an unincorporated community in Logan County, West Virginia, United States. Pecks Mill is located on the Guyandotte River and West Virginia Route 10, 1.5 miles (2.4 km) north of Mitchell Heights. Pecks Mill has a post office with ZIP code 25547.

The community was named after the Peck family, the proprietors of a local gristmill.
