= Cora, West Virginia =

Unincorporated community in West Virginia, United States

- Unincorporated community
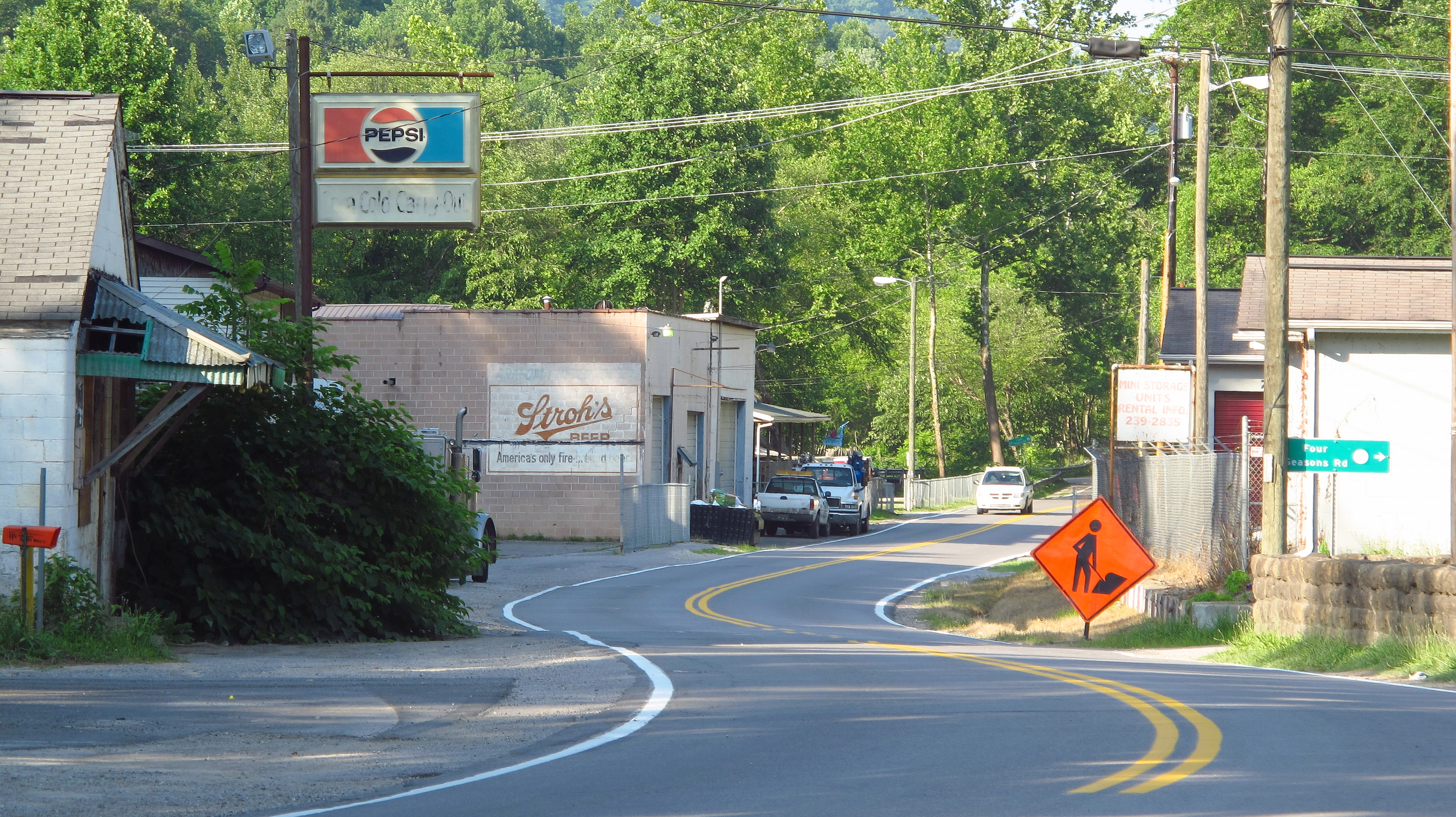
- Old US Highway 119 in Cora

- Location within West Virginia Location within the United States
- Coordinates: 37°50′03″N 82°01′35″W
- Country: United States
- State: West Virginia
- County: Logan
- Elevation: 738 ft (225 m)
- Time zone: UTC-5 (Eastern (EST))
  - Summer (DST): UTC-4 (EDT)
- ZIP code: 25614
- Area codes: 304 & 681
- GNIS feature ID: 1554190

Cora is an unincorporated community in Logan County, West Virginia, United States. Cora is 2 miles (3 km) southwest of Logan, along the Copperas Mine Fork. Cora has a post office with ZIP code 25614. It is part of the Mount Gay-Shamrock census-designated place.

== Climate ==
The climate in this area is characterized by hot, humid summers and generally mild to cool winters. According to the Köppen Climate Classification system, Cora has a humid subtropical climate, abbreviated "Cfa" on climate maps.
