= Godby Heights, West Virginia =

Unincorporated community in West Virginia, United States

- Unincorporated community
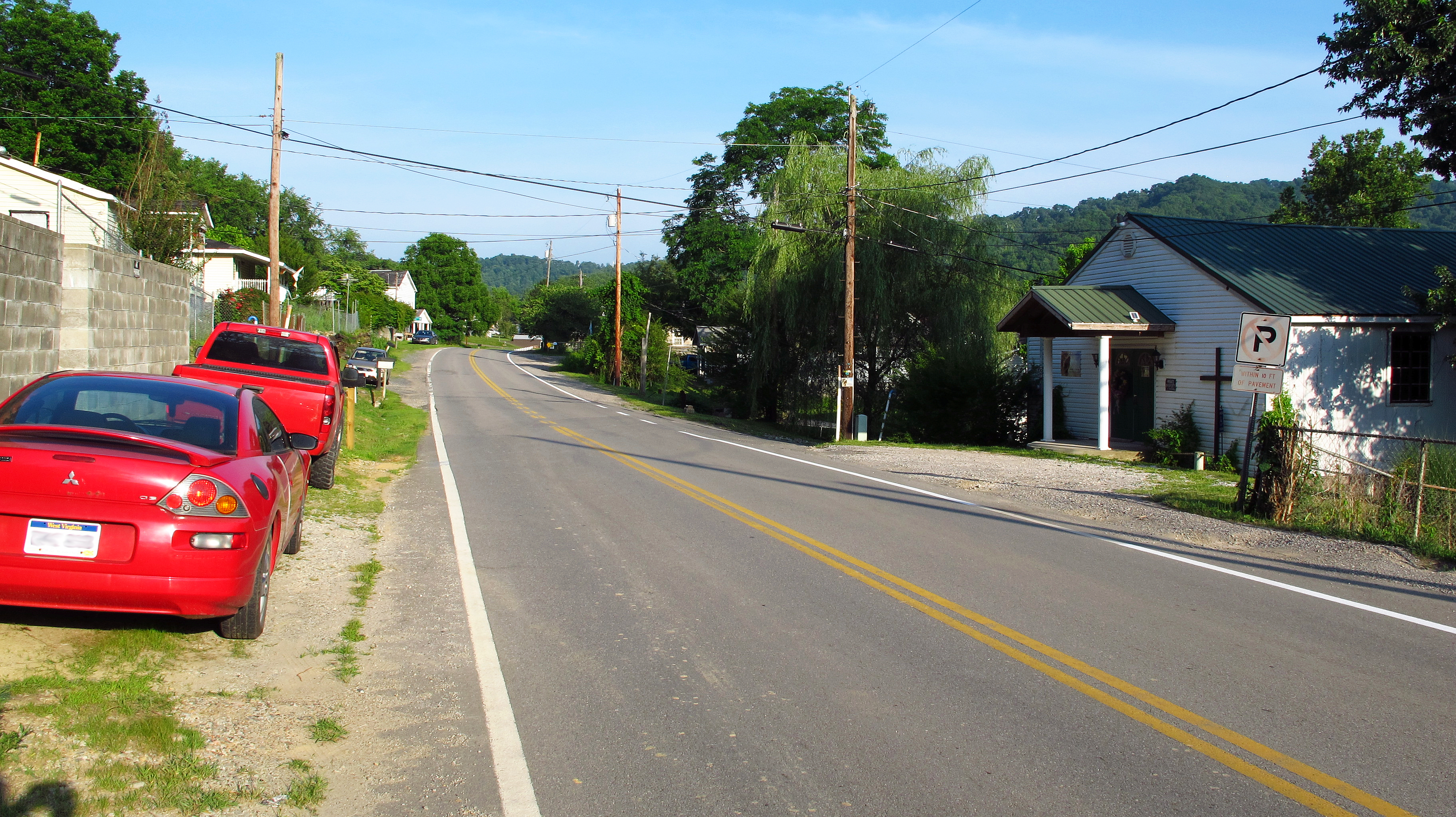
- Thunder Road in Godby Heights

- Location within West Virginia Location within the United States
- Coordinates: 37°56′13″N 82°0′32″W
- Country: United States
- State: West Virginia
- County: Logan
- Elevation: 673 ft (205 m)
- Time zone: UTC-5 (Eastern (EST))
  - Summer (DST): UTC-4 (EDT)
- GNIS ID: 1539485

Godby Heights is an unincorporated community in Logan County, West Virginia, United States.
