= Orville, West Virginia =

- Unincorporated community
- Location within West Virginia Location within the United States
- Coordinates: 37°48′51″N 81°53′31″W
- Country: United States
- State: West Virginia
- County: Logan
- Elevation: 830 ft (250 m)
- Time zone: UTC-5 (Eastern (EST))
  - Summer (DST): UTC-4 (EDT)
- GNIS ID: 1544448

Orville is an unincorporated community in Logan County, West Virginia, United States.
