= Whites Addition, West Virginia =

- Unincorporated community
- Location within West Virginia Location within the United States
- Coordinates: 37°50′13″N 82°00′18″W
- Country: United States
- State: West Virginia
- County: Logan
- Elevation: 817 ft (249 m)
- Time zone: UTC-5 (Eastern (EST))
  - Summer (DST): UTC-4 (EDT)
- Area codes: 304 & 681
- GNIS feature ID: 1555974

Whites Addition is an unincorporated community in Logan County, West Virginia, United States. Whites Addition is located along Island Creek and West Virginia Route 44, 1 mile (1.6 km) southwest of Logan. It is part of the Mount Gay-Shamrock census-designated place.
