= Sulphur Springs, West Virginia =

- Unincorporated community
- Location within West Virginia Location within the United States
- Coordinates: 37°49′51″N 82°06′10″W
- Country: United States
- State: West Virginia
- County: Logan
- Elevation: 823 ft (251 m)
- Time zone: UTC-5 (Eastern (EST))
  - Summer (DST): UTC-4 (EDT)
- Area codes: 304 & 681
- GNIS feature ID: 1549944

Sulphur Springs is an unincorporated community in Logan County, West Virginia, United States. Sulphur Springs is located along Copperas Mine Fork and County Route 9/2, 6.1 miles (9.8 km) west-southwest of Logan.
