= Sunset Court, West Virginia =

- Unincorporated community
- Location within West Virginia Location within the United States
- Coordinates: 37°57′38″N 82°1′18″W
- Country: United States
- State: West Virginia
- County: Logan
- Elevation: 650 ft (200 m)
- Time zone: UTC-5 (Eastern (EST))
  - Summer (DST): UTC-4 (EDT)
- GNIS ID: 1547764

Sunset Court is an unincorporated community in Logan County, West Virginia, United States.
