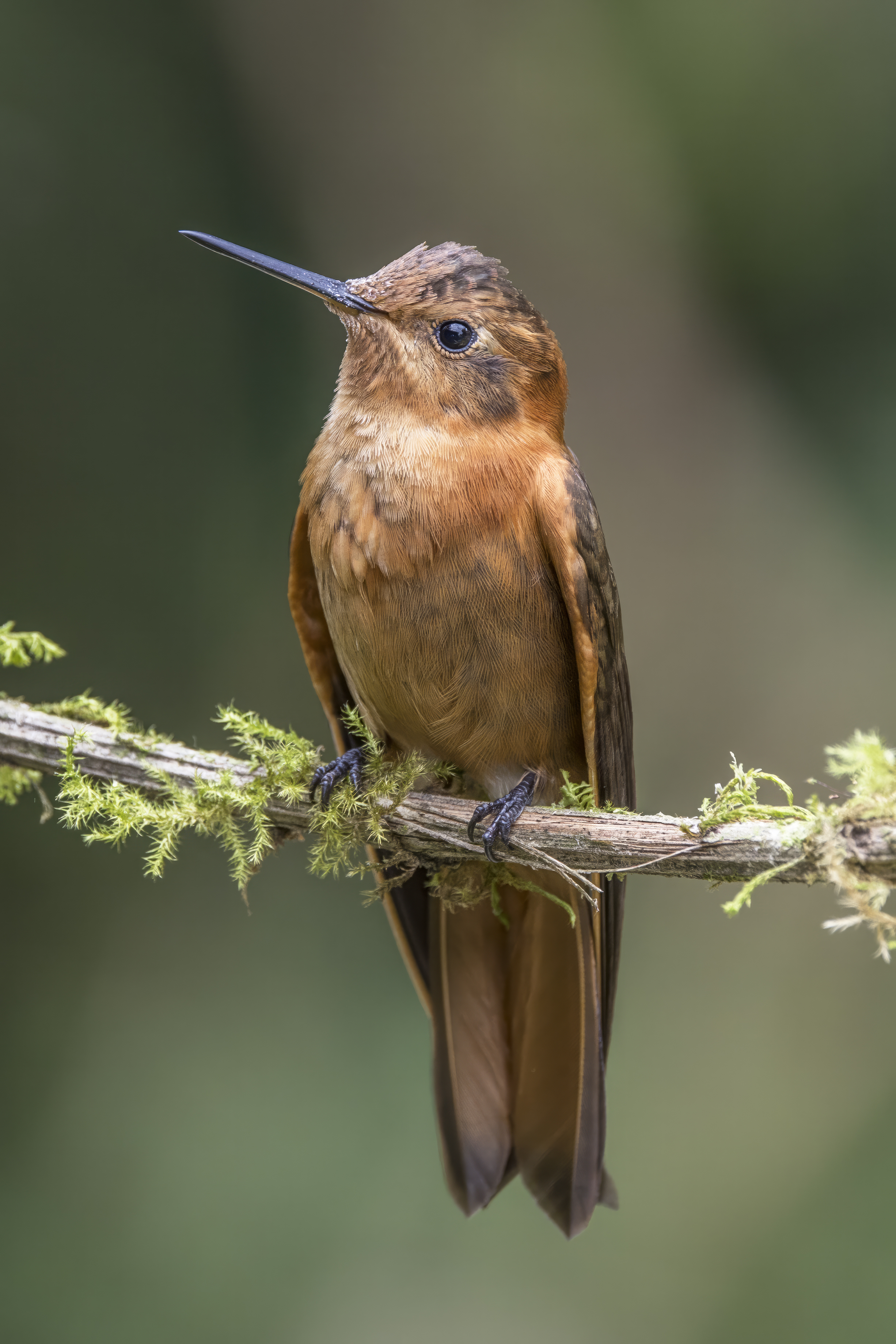
- A. c. cupripennis in Colombia

Conservation status
- Least Concern (IUCN 3.1)
- CITES Appendix II

Scientific classification
- Kingdom: Animalia
- Phylum: Chordata
- Class: Aves
- Order: Apodiformes
- Family: Trochilidae
- Genus: Aglaeactis
- Species: A. cupripennis

Binomial name
- Aglaeactis cupripennis (Bourcier, 1843)
- Geographical range of A. cupripennis

= Shining sunbeam =

Species of hummingbird

The shining sunbeam (Aglaeactis cupripennis) is a species of hummingbird in the "brilliants", tribe Heliantheini in subfamily Lesbiinae. It is found in Colombia, Ecuador, and Peru.

== Taxonomy and systematics ==
As of 2022, the shining sunbeam had two recognized subspecies, the nominate A. c. cupripennis and A. c. caumatonota. In the past the species had been subdivided into as many as six subspecies. In addition, what is now the purple-backed sunbeam (A. aliciae) has also been treated as a subspecies of shining sunbeam.

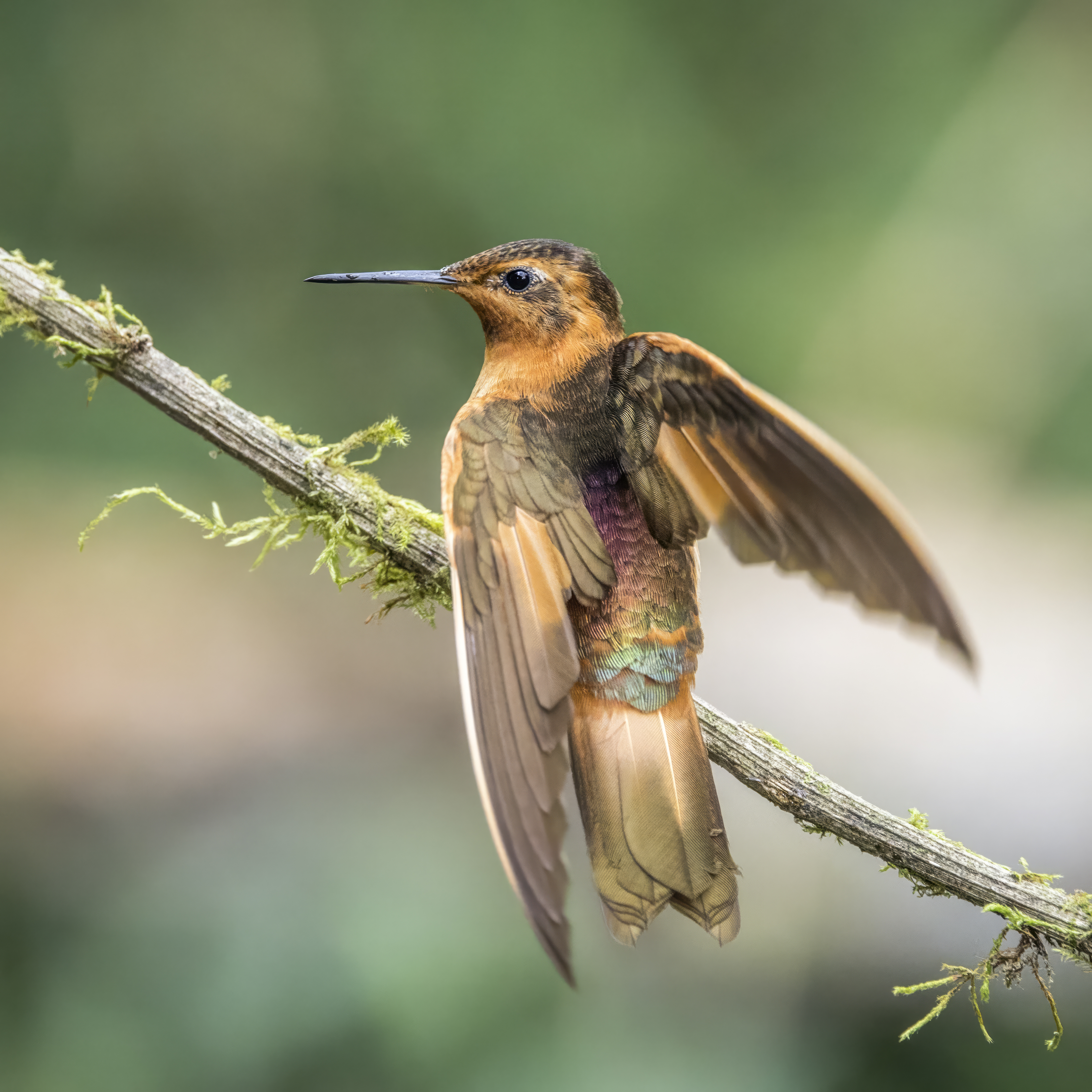
A shining sunbeam showing the iridescent feathers on its back

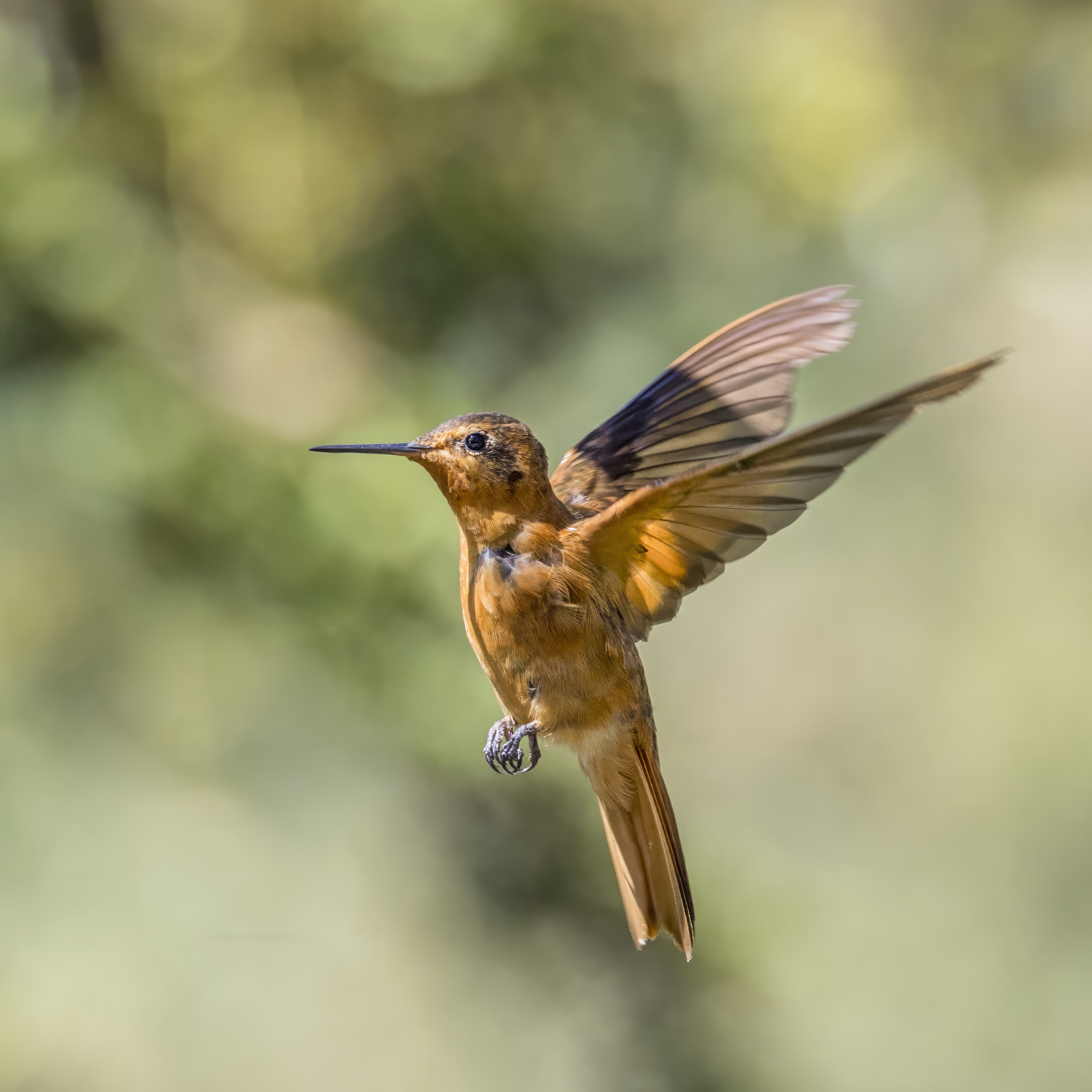
A shining sunbeam in flight

== Description ==
The shining sunbeam is 12 to 13 cm (4.7 to 5.1 in) long. Males weigh 7.6 to 8.1 g (0.27 to 0.29 oz) and females 6.9 to 7.5 g (0.24 to 0.26 oz). Both sexes have a short, straight, black bill. Unique among sunbeams, neither sex has any white plumage. Males of the nominate subspecies have a dark brown crown and upper back; their lower back and rump are lilac-gold becoming silvery green on the uppertail coverts. Their tail feathers are dark brown to rufous, usually with bronzy edges. Their throat is rufous dotted with dusky gray, the breast a patchy buff, and the belly reddish brown. From north to south, the male's underparts become brighter, the crown darker, and the tail redder. Females are similar to the males but the gold and green of the lower back and rump are duller or absent. A. c. caumatonota differs from the nominate with an iridescent amethyst rump and purplish amethyst uppertail coverts.

== Distribution and habitat ==
The nominate subspecies of shining sunbeam is found in all three Andean ranges of Colombia and south from there through Ecuador to Peru's departments of La Libertad and Huánuco. A. c. caumatonota is found in Peru from the nominate's range south to the departments of Lima and Cuzco.

The species inhabits sub-páramo to páramo, landscapes characterized by grasslands with scattered shrubs and trees. It also inhabits cloudforest and semi-arid ridges with a few trees. In elevation it ranges from 2,500 to 4,300 m (8,200 to 14,100 ft).

== Behavior ==
=== Movement ===
In Colombia at least, the shining sunbeam makes seasonal elevational movements.

=== Feeding ===
The shining sunbeam forages for nectar at all levels from the ground to treetops. It feeds at a wide variety of bromeliads, vines, and trees including Embothrium, Puya, and Fuchsia, and males defend patches of flowering plants. The species also feeds on small arthropods by hawking.

=== Breeding ===
The shining sunbeam's breeding seasons differ throughout its range, from March to September in Colombia, between February and April in Ecuador, and in (and possibly between) November and April in Peru. It builds a compact cup nest of moss and cobweb lined with soft plant fibers and sometimes decorated on the outside with bark or lichen. It is placed on a branch or epiphyte, usually 4 to 10 m (10 to 30 ft) above ground but sometimes as high as 15 m (50 ft). The female alone incubates the clutch of two white eggs for 16 to 18 days; fledging occurs 24 to 27 days after hatch.

=== Vocalization ===
The shining sunbeam's song is "high-pitched chirping notes, 'tsip...chew...chew...tseep.....tsip..chew...'". Its calls include "single upslurred 'suweet' notes and single high-pitched 'see' notes."

== Status ==
The IUCN has assessed the shining sunbeam as being of Least Concern. It has a large range, and though its population size is not known it is believed to be stable. It is generally fairly common, occurs in a wide range of habitats, and is found in several protected areas.
