= Logan Heights, West Virginia =

- Unincorporated community
- Location within West Virginia Location within the United States
- Coordinates: 37°50′13″N 82°1′33″W
- Country: United States
- State: West Virginia
- County: Logan
- Elevation: 692 ft (211 m)
- Time zone: UTC-5 (Eastern (EST))
  - Summer (DST): UTC-4 (EDT)
- GNIS ID: 1554987

Logan Heights is an unincorporated community in Logan County, West Virginia, United States. It is part of the Mount Gay-Shamrock census-designated place.
