= Sharples, West Virginia =

- Unincorporated community
- Location within West Virginia Location within the United States
- Coordinates: 37°55′13″N 81°49′45″W
- Country: United States
- State: West Virginia
- County: Logan
- Elevation: 843 ft (257 m)
- Time zone: UTC-5 (Eastern (EST))
  - Summer (DST): UTC-4 (EDT)
- ZIP code: 25183
- Area codes: 304 & 681
- GNIS feature ID: 1555601

Sharples is an unincorporated community in Logan County, West Virginia, United States. Sharples is located on West Virginia Route 17, 10.5 miles (16.9 km) northeast of Logan. Sharples has a post office with ZIP code 25183.

Sharples was the location of a small firefight in the events leading up to the Battle of Blair Mountain.

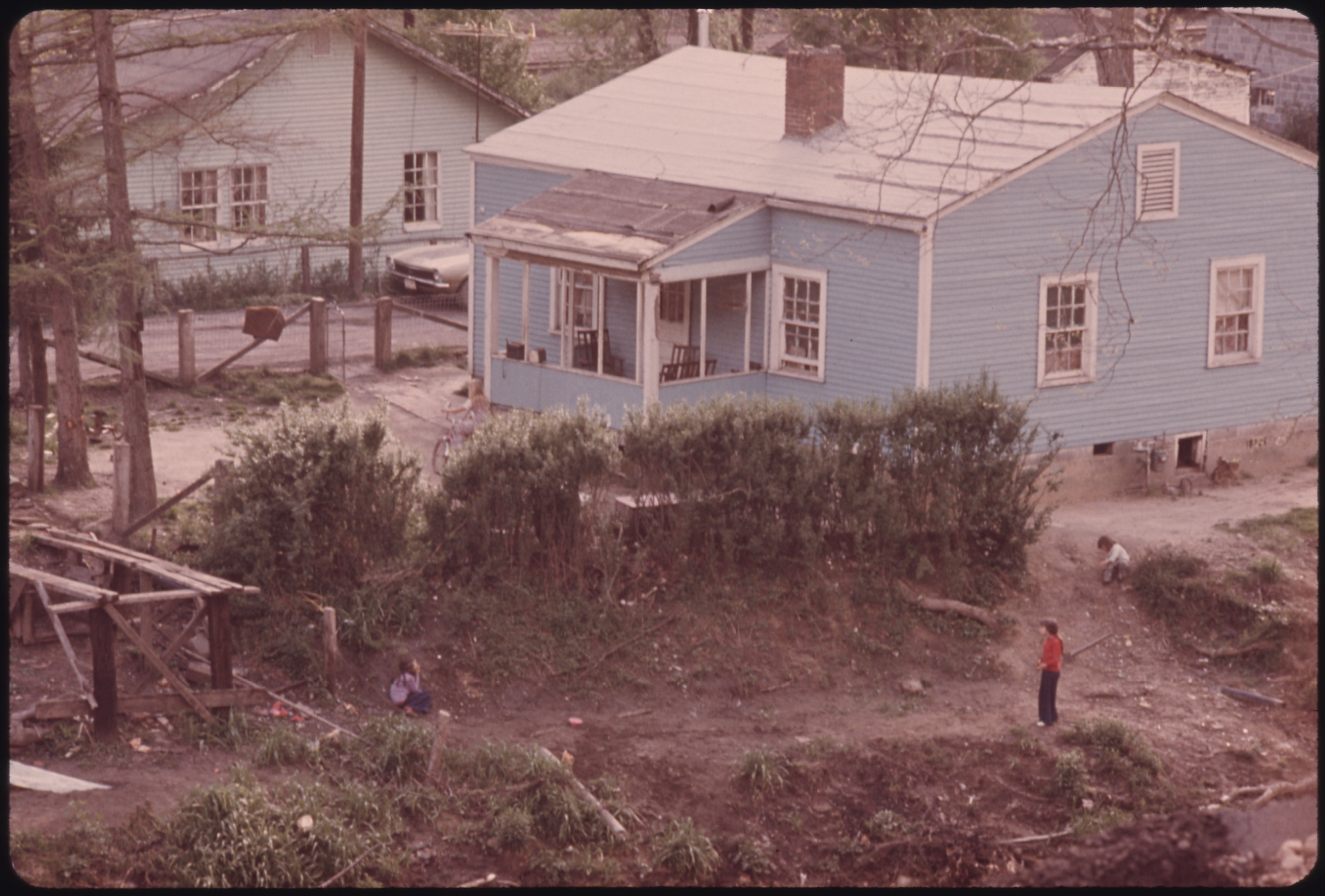
Sharples in April 1974
