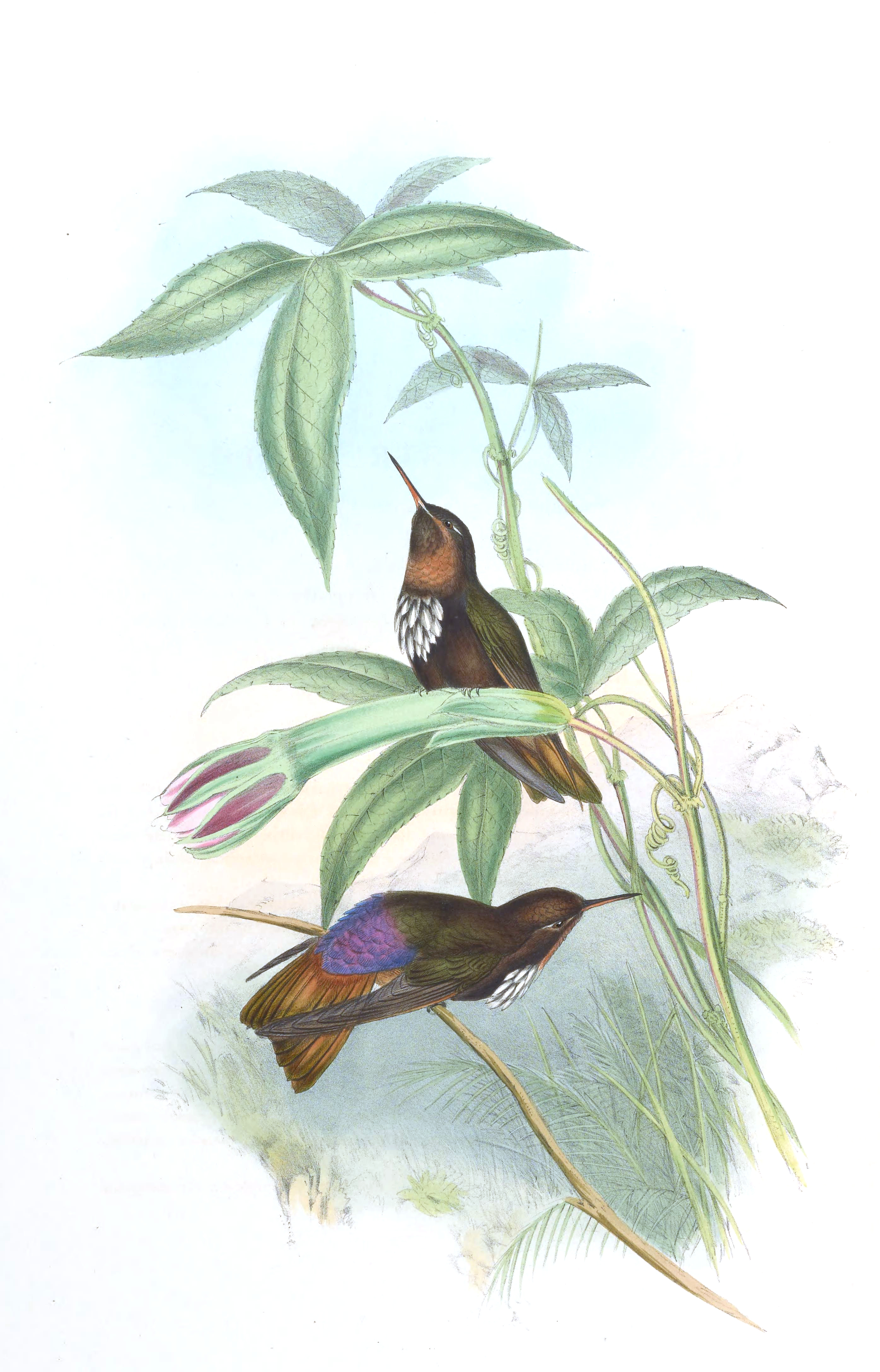
- White-tufted sunbeam, Aglaeactis castelnaudii

Scientific classification
- Kingdom: Animalia
- Phylum: Chordata
- Class: Aves
- Order: Apodiformes
- Family: Trochilidae
- Tribe: Heliantheini
- Genus: Aglaeactis; Gould, 1848

Type species
- Trochilus cupripennis Bourcier, 1843

Species
- 4, see text

= Aglaeactis =

Genus of birds

Aglaeactis is a genus of hummingbirds in the family Trochilidae.

== Species ==
Aglaeactis contains the following species:

Genus Aglaeactis – Gould, 1848 – four species
Common name	Scientific name and subspecies	Range	Size and ecology	IUCN status and estimated population
Shining sunbeam	Aglaeactis cupripennis (Bourcier, 1843) Two subspecies: A. c. cupripennis; A. c. caumatonota	Colombia, Ecuador, and Peru	Size: 12 to 13 cm (4.7 to 5.1 in) long. Males weigh 7.6 to 8.1 g (0.27 to 0.29 oz) and females 6.9 to 7.5 g (0.24 to 0.26 oz) Habitat: Diet:	LC
Purple-backed sunbeam	Aglaeactis aliciae Salvin, 1896	Peru	Size: Habitat: Diet:	VU
White-tufted sunbeam	Aglaeactis castelnaudii (Bourcier & Mulsant, 1848)	Peru	Size: 12 cm in height and weighs 7- 8.5 g. Habitat: Diet:	LC
Black-hooded sunbeam	Aglaeactis pamela (d'Orbigny, 1838)	Bolivia	Size: 12 cm (4.7 in) long including its 15 mm (0.59 in) straight black bill. Males weigh about 5.2 g (0.18 oz) and females 5.8 g (0.20 oz). Habitat: Diet:	LC

== Territories ==
Shining sunbeam territories are characterized by highly utilized central core areas with high overall use, but low foraging activity. These territories are usually those associated with structural complexity like canopy coverings, vegetation densities, and ideal nesting/roosting sites. High canopy heights and adequate vegetation densities allow these hummingbirds to effectively transmit auditory and visual signals. More exposed and elevated perches are usually favored. These birds pick the most ideal territories to avoid predators and defend their territories.
