= Logan County, West Virginia =

County in West Virginia, United States

- County
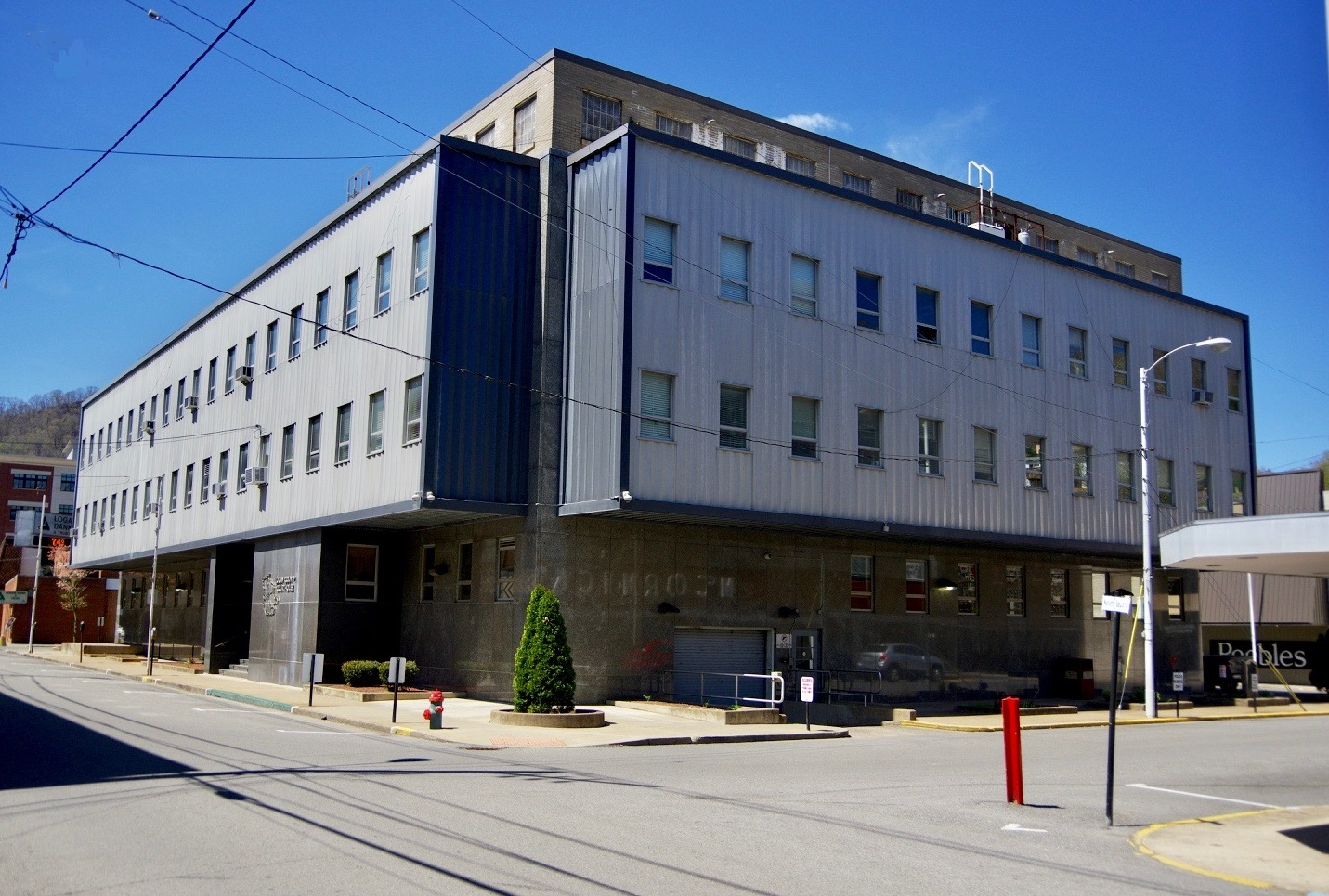
- Logan County Courthouse in Logan

- Location within the U.S. state of West Virginia
- Coordinates: 37°50′N 81°56′W
- Country: United States
- State: West Virginia
- Founded: January 12, 1824
- Named for: Chief Logan
- Seat: Logan
- Largest city: Logan

Area
  - Total: 456 sq mi (1,180 km^{2})
  - Land: 454 sq mi (1,180 km^{2})
  - Water: 1.9 sq mi (4.9 km^{2}) 0.4%

Population (2020)
  - Total: 32,567
  - Estimate (2025): 30,375 ▼
  - Density: 71.7/sq mi (27.7/km^{2})
- Time zone: UTC−5 (Eastern)
  - Summer (DST): UTC−4 (EDT)
- Congressional district: 1st
- Website: www.logancounty.wv.gov

Logan County is a county in the U.S. state of West Virginia. As of the 2020 census, the population was 32,567. Its county seat is Logan. Logan County comprises the Logan, WV Micropolitan Statistical Area, which is also included in the Charleston–Huntington–Ashland, WV–OH–KY Combined Statistical Area.

== History ==
Logan County was formed in 1824 from parts of Giles, Tazewell, Cabell, and Kanawha counties, then part of the state of Virginia. It is named for Chief Logan, famous Native American chief of the Mingo tribe. Logan was one of fifty Virginia counties that became part of the new state of West Virginia in 1863, by an executive order of Abraham Lincoln during the Civil War, even though Logan County had voted for secession in the April 4, 1861, convention.

Within months of its admission to the Union, West Virginia's counties were divided into civil townships, with the intention of encouraging local government. This proved impractical in the heavily rural state, and in 1872 the townships were converted into magisterial districts. Logan County was divided into five districts: Chapmanville, (Note: Regularly spelled "Chapmansville" until the 1950s.) Hardee, Logan, Magnolia, and Triadelphia. A sixth district, Lee, was formed in 1878 from portions of Hardy and Magnolia Districts. In 1895, Mingo County was formed from Hardee, Lee, and Magnolia Districts, along with portions of Chapmanville and Triadelphia Districts.

In the 1960s, Chapmanville District was discontinued, and two new districts, Guyan and Island Creek, formed from its territory, along with portions of Logan and Triadelphia Districts. The county was redistricted again in the 1980s, resulting in nine magisterial districts: Buffalo, Chapmanville, East, Guyan, Island Creek, Logan, Northwest, Triadelphia, and West. However, in the following decade these were consolidated into three districts: Central, Eastern, and Western.

In 1921 it was the location of the Battle of Blair Mountain, one of the largest armed uprisings in U.S. history. The Buffalo Creek Flood of February 26, 1972, killed 125 people when a coal slurry dam burst under the pressure of heavy rains, releasing over 100,000,000 US gallons (380,000,000 L) of waste and water in a 30-foot (9.1 m) wave onto the valley below. The communities of Lorado and Lundale were destroyed and 14 other communities heavily damaged, including Saunders, Amherstdale, Crites, and Latrobe.

== Geography ==
According to the United States Census Bureau, the county has a total area of 456 square miles (1,180 km^{2}), of which 454 square miles (1,180 km^{2}) is land and 1.9 square miles (4.9 km^{2}) (0.4%) is water.

=== Major highways ===
- I-73 (future)
- I-74 (future)
- U.S. Highway 52
- U.S. Highway 119
- West Virginia Route 10
- West Virginia Route 17
- West Virginia Route 44
- West Virginia Route 73
- West Virginia Route 80

=== Adjacent counties ===
- Lincoln County (north)
- Boone County (northeast)
- Wyoming County (southeast)
- Mingo County (southwest)

== Demographics ==
Historical population
Census	Pop.	Note	%±
1830	3,680		—
1840	4,309		17.1%
1850	3,620		−16.0%
1860	4,938		36.4%
1870	5,124		3.8%
1880	7,329		43.0%
1890	11,101		51.5%
1900	6,955		−37.3%
1910	14,476		108.1%
1920	41,006		183.3%
1930	58,534		42.7%
1940	67,768		15.8%
1950	77,391		14.2%
1960	61,570		−20.4%
1970	46,269		−24.9%
1980	50,679		9.5%
1990	43,032		−15.1%
2000	37,710		−12.4%
2010	36,743		−2.6%
2020	32,567		−11.4%
2025 (est.)	30,375	▼	−6.7%
U.S. Decennial Census; 1790–1960 1900–1990; 1990–2000 2010–2020

=== 2020 census ===
As of the 2020 census, the county had a population of 32,567. Of the residents, 19.8% were under the age of 18 and 20.8% were 65 years of age or older; the median age was 44.4 years. For every 100 females there were 99.1 males, and for every 100 females age 18 and over there were 97.4 males.

The racial makeup of the county was 94.8% White, 1.8% Black or African American, 0.1% American Indian and Alaska Native, 0.2% Asian, 0.2% from some other race, and 2.8% from two or more races. Hispanic or Latino residents of any race comprised 0.7% of the population.

There were 13,033 households in the county, of which 27.9% had children under the age of 18 living with them and 27.1% had a female householder with no spouse or partner present. About 27.8% of all households were made up of individuals and 13.5% had someone living alone who was 65 years of age or older.

There were 14,738 housing units, of which 11.6% were vacant. Among occupied housing units, 75.7% were owner-occupied and 24.3% were renter-occupied. The homeowner vacancy rate was 1.5% and the rental vacancy rate was 10.4%.

Logan County, West Virginia – Racial and ethnic composition Note: the US Census treats Hispanic/Latino as an ethnic category. This table excludes Latinos from the racial categories and assigns them to a separate category. Hispanics/Latinos may be of any race.
Race / Ethnicity (NH = Non-Hispanic)	Pop 2000	Pop 2010	Pop 2020	% 2000	% 2010	% 2020
White alone (NH)	36,157	35,285	30,785	95.88%	96.03%	94.52%
Black or African American alone (NH)	970	780	580	2.57%	2.12%	1.78%
Native American or Alaska Native alone (NH)	41	30	41	0.10%	0.08%	0.12%
Asian alone (NH)	113	101	63	0.29%	0.27%	0.19%
Pacific Islander alone (NH)	8	0	1	0.02%	0.00%	0.00%
Other race alone (NH)	7	15	34	0.01%	0.04%	0.10%
Mixed race or Multiracial (NH)	212	274	839	0.56%	0.74%	2.57%
Hispanic or Latino (any race)	202	258	224	0.53%	0.70%	0.68%
Total	37,710	36,743	32,567	100.00%	100.00%	100.00%

=== 2010 census ===
As of the 2010 United States census, there were 36,743 people, 14,907 households, and 10,512 families living in the county. The population density was 81.0 inhabitants per square mile (31.3/km^{2}). There were 16,743 housing units at an average density of 36.9 units per square mile (14.2 units/km^{2}). The racial makeup of the county was 96.5% white, 2.1% black or African American, 0.3% Asian, 0.1% American Indian, 0.1% from other races, and 0.8% from two or more races. Those of Hispanic or Latino origin made up 0.7% of the population. In terms of ancestry, 16.6% were Irish, 13.3% were German, 7.8% were English, and 6.9% were American.

Of the 14,907 households, 30.1% had children under the age of 18 living with them, 52.7% were married couples living together, 12.5% had a female householder with no husband present, 29.5% were non-families, and 26.1% of all households were made up of individuals. The average household size was 2.43 and the average family size was 2.90. The median age was 42.4 years.

The median income for a household in the county was $35,465 and the median income for a family was $43,475. Males had a median income of $39,462 versus $26,571 for females. The per capita income for the county was $18,614. About 17.6% of families and 21.8% of the population were below the poverty line, including 32.8% of those under age 18 and 7.4% of those age 65 or over.

=== 2000 census ===
As of the census of 2000, there were 37,710 people, 14,880 households, and 10,936 families living in the county. The population density was 83 people per square mile (32 people/km^{2}). There were 16,807 housing units at an average density of 37 units per square mile (14 units/km^{2}). The racial makeup of the county was 96.33% White, 2.59% Black or African American, 0.12% Native American, 0.30% Asian, 0.02% Pacific Islander, 0.06% from other races, and 0.59% from two or more races. 0.54% of the population were Hispanic or Latino of any race.

There were 14,880 households, out of which 30.50% had children under the age of 18 living with them, 57.00% were married couples living together, 12.60% had a female householder with no husband present, and 26.50% were non-families. 24.00% of all households were made up of individuals, and 11.40% had someone living alone who was 65 years of age or older. The average household size was 2.50 and the average family size was 2.95.

In the county, the population was spread out, with 22.10% under the age of 18, 9.30% from 18 to 24, 28.00% from 25 to 44, 26.10% from 45 to 64, and 14.50% who were 65 years of age or older. The median age was 39 years. For every 100 females there were 94.20 males. For every 100 females age 18 and over, there were 91.00 males.

The median income for a household in the county was $24,603, and the median income for a family was $29,072. Males had a median income of $31,515 versus $20,212 for females. The per capita income for the county was $14,102. About 20.80% of families and 24.10% of the population were below the poverty line, including 34.60% of those under age 18 and 14.40% of those age 65 or over.

== Politics ==
Logan County, being historically secessionist and between the New Deal and the 1990s heavily unionized, was once powerfully Democratic. Before the 2008 presidential election, the only Republican to carry the county had been Herbert Hoover in 1928, due to strong anti-Catholicism against Al Smith in this "Bible Belt" region. Logan was the only county in West Virginia to be carried by George McGovern in his 1972 campaign, and between 1976 and 2000 no Republican reached 40 percent of the county's vote.

From 2000 to 2016, the county swung more Republican in each consecutive election, particularly due to the Democratic Party's support for environmentalist policies. Democratic vote shares since 2016 have plummeted to levels historically more typical of unionist, traditionally Republican counties like Grant.

United States presidential election results for Logan County, West Virginia
Year	Republican		Democratic		Third party(ies)	
Year	No.	%	No.	%	No.	%
1912	518	18.43%	1,404	49.95%	889	31.63%
1916	2,107	38.74%	3,270	60.12%	62	1.14%
1920	4,304	43.32%	5,588	56.24%	44	0.44%
1924	7,062	46.92%	7,377	49.01%	612	4.07%
1928	11,404	53.32%	9,944	46.49%	41	0.19%
1932	10,683	45.88%	12,529	53.81%	71	0.30%
1936	7,069	27.68%	18,424	72.13%	49	0.19%
1940	9,860	36.70%	17,010	63.30%	0	0.00%
1944	8,000	35.25%	14,692	64.75%	0	0.00%
1948	7,362	31.25%	16,121	68.43%	76	0.32%
1952	9,148	32.15%	19,302	67.85%	0	0.00%
1956	10,588	41.71%	14,794	58.29%	0	0.00%
1960	7,836	32.39%	16,360	67.61%	0	0.00%
1964	3,776	18.18%	16,999	81.82%	0	0.00%
1968	4,754	23.42%	13,686	67.42%	1,861	9.17%
1972	9,533	48.69%	10,045	51.31%	0	0.00%
1976	4,021	23.46%	13,122	76.54%	0	0.00%
1980	4,945	28.37%	12,024	68.99%	459	2.63%
1984	6,425	36.96%	10,892	62.66%	65	0.37%
1988	4,244	27.19%	11,317	72.51%	47	0.30%
1992	3,336	20.47%	11,095	68.08%	1,866	11.45%
1996	2,627	17.45%	10,840	72.00%	1,589	10.55%
2000	5,334	36.94%	8,927	61.83%	178	1.23%
2004	7,047	47.02%	7,877	52.56%	63	0.42%
2008	7,326	54.17%	5,873	43.43%	325	2.40%
2012	8,222	68.68%	3,469	28.98%	281	2.35%
2016	9,897	79.56%	2,092	16.82%	451	3.63%
2020	10,534	80.87%	2,333	17.91%	159	1.22%
2024	9,500	82.83%	1,848	16.11%	121	1.06%

== Communities ==
=== Incorporated communities ===
- Logan (county seat)
- Chapmanville
- Man
- Mitchell Heights
- West Logan

=== Magisterial districts ===
- Central
- Eastern
- Western

=== Census-designated places ===
- Accoville
- Amherstdale
- Big Creek
- Bruno
- Chauncey
- Crooked Creek
- Earling
- Greenville
- Henlawson
- Holden
- Justice Addition
- Kistler
- Mallory
- McConnell
- Monaville
- Mount Gay-Shamrock
- Neibert
- Omar
- Peach Creek
- Robinette
- Rossmore
- Sarah Ann
- Stollings
- Switzer
- Verdunville

=== Unincorporated communities ===
- Argyle
- Baber
- Baisden
- Banco
- Barnabus
- Becco
- Beebe
- Blair
- Bradshaw
- Braeholm
- Chambers
- Christian
- Claypool
- Coal Valley
- Cora
- Craneco
- Crites
- Crown
- Crystal Block
- Dabney
- Daisy
- Davin
- Davis
- Dehue
- Diamond
- Dobra
- Dog Patch
- Don
- Emmett
- Ethel
- Fanco
- Five Block
- Fort Branch
- Frogtown
- Gillman Bottom
- Godby Heights
- Guyan Terrace
- Halcyon
- Hedgeview
- Hensley Heights
- Hetzel
- Huff Junction
- Hutchinson
- Isom
- Kelly
- Kitchen
- Lake
- Landville
- Latrobe
- Lintz Addition
- Logan Heights
- Lorado
- Lundale
- Lyburn
- Melville
- Micco
- Mifflin
- Mineral City
- Monclo
- Monitor
- Mountain View
- Oilville
- Orville
- Pardee
- Pecks Mill
- Phico
- Pine Creek
- Ralumco
- Red Campbell
- Ridgeview
- Rita
- Rum Junction
- Saunders
- Sharples
- Shegon
- Shively
- Slagle
- Sodom
- Spruce Valley
- Stirrat
- Stone Branch
- Stowe
- Sulphur Springs
- Sunbeam
- Sunset Court
- Superior Bottom
- Sycamore
- Taplin
- Thompson Town
- Trace Junction
- Troy Town
- Upper Whitman
- Verner
- Walnut Hill
- Wanda
- Whirlwind
- Whites Addition
- Whitman
- Whitman Junction
- Wilkinson
- Wylo
- Yolyn

=== School districts ===
- Logan County Schools (consolidated, county-wide)

== Notable people ==
- Elaine McMillion Sheldon, film director, producer and writer

== See also ==
- Aracoma Alma Mine accident
- Buffalo Creek flood
- Chief Logan State Park
- Elk Creek Wildlife Management Area
- James H. Harless
- Landau Eugene Murphy Jr.
- Logan (Iroquois leader)
- National Register of Historic Places listings in Logan County, West Virginia
