= Fort Branch, West Virginia =

Unincorporated community in West Virginia, United States

- Unincorporated community
- Location within West Virginia Location within the United States
- Coordinates: 37°50′57″N 81°56′37″W
- Country: United States
- State: West Virginia
- County: Logan
- Elevation: 718 ft (219 m)
- Time zone: UTC-5 (Eastern (EST))
  - Summer (DST): UTC-4 (EDT)
- GNIS ID: 1539154

Fort Branch is an unincorporated community in Logan County, West Virginia, United States.

Fort Branch is the home of Floodstage Stadium, an asphalt slab helipad that was converted by local schoolboys to become a multipurpose sports field. A depression in the middle of the helipad notoriously collected and maintained a large puddle of rainwater, providing the inspiration for the name "Floodstage Stadium".
