= Hetzel (surname) =

Hetzel is a German-language given name and surname. It may be a pet form of the given name Hermann . It may also be an occupational name for someone who provided wood or a nickname for a stubborn person. Notable people with the surname include:

- Amy Hetzel (born 1983), Australian water polo player
- Basil Hetzel (1922–2017), Australian medical researcher
- Eric Hetzel (born 1963), American baseball player
- Fred Hetzel (born 1942), American basketball player
- George Hetzel (1826–1899), American painter
- Patrick Hetzel (born 1964), French Member of Parliament
- Phyllis Hetzel (1918–2011), British civil servant
- Pierre-Jules Hetzel (1814–1886), French editor and publisher
- Ralph D. Hetzel (1882–1947), American academic and educator
- William C. Hetzel, technology expert
