= Peach Creek (Grindstone Creek tributary) =

Stream in Missouri, United States of America

Peach Creek is a stream in southeast DeKalb County in the U.S. state of Missouri. It is a tributary of Grindstone Creek.

The stream headwaters arise approximately three miles east-southeast of Maysville adjacent to Missouri Route C at 39°53′10″N 94°18′46″W. The stream flows generally southeast for about three miles to its confluence with Grindstone Creek two miles northeast of the community of Fordham at 39°51′25″N 94°15′23″W.

Peach Creek most likely was so named due to the presence of nearby peach trees.

== See also ==
- List of rivers of Missouri
