= Fort Branch (Missouri) =

Stream in the US state of Missouri

Coordinates: 39.1008797°N 91.0287513°W

Fort Branch is a stream in Lincoln County in the U.S. state of Missouri. It is a tributary of Cuivre River.

Fort Branch took its name from Stout's Fort, a bygone fortification near its course.

== See also ==
- List of rivers of Missouri
