= Whitman, West Virginia =

- Unincorporated community
- Location within West Virginia Location within the United States
- Coordinates: 37°48′48″N 82°01′28″W
- Country: United States
- State: West Virginia
- County: Logan
- Elevation: 787 ft (240 m)

Population
  - Total: 1,250
- Time zone: UTC-5 (Eastern (EST))
  - Summer (DST): UTC-4 (EDT)
- ZIP code: 25652
- Area codes: 304 & 681
- GNIS feature ID: 1555977

Whitman is an unincorporated community in Logan County, West Virginia, United States. Whitman is 3 miles (4.8 km) southwest of Logan. Whitman has a post office with ZIP code 25652.

Whitman Creek's watershed length is about seven miles long and has a watershed area of about 10.6 square miles. Whitman Creek Road is 5.5 miles in length from mouth of hollow to head of hollow. There are two significant side roads off of Whitman Creek Road. The first is Bradshaw Hollow Road (1.4 miles from mouth to head of hollow) with a branch road off of it and both dead ends. The second is Pine Gap Branch. This road has connecting roads leading to other main roads, but travel may be restricted by the active coal company at Pine Creek.

Pine Gap Branch is dirt/gravel road that is 1.5 miles in length until its "T" into a dirt/gravel road called Bailey Hwy. (A coal company road which ends at a coal company prep plant) Pine Creek Road (dirt/gravel road) starts here and runs to Omar, WV and Route 44. Total distance is 11.5 miles and takes around 30 minutes (faster to go back out Whitman Creek Road to Holden Road to Route 44 and down to Omar [14.5 miles and around 23 minutes and all paved roads]).

In the history of Whitman Creek, an early identification was on a 1910 map. Much of the area of Whitman, WV was owned a Mr. Baisden who had two sons named Hardy and Farley Baisden. Later in History two coal camps on Whitman Creek would be named for these two sons. In a 1915 Map of the Logan County, Coal Field in West Virginia, the map shows Whitman Creek areas as part of the United States Coal and Oil Company. This was later purchased by Island Creek Coal Company.

Island Creek Coal Company had mining, railroad, coal camps, etc... reaching 5 miles up Whitman Creek. In this area they started three coal mine operations with start up before or during 1916 through 1922. The mines were Island Creek No. 3, No. 14 and No. 20. Nothing remains of these operations as all are sealed up, and all infrastructure has been removed. No. 3 site is now used as an asphalt plant, and No. 20 site is now where National Armature & Machine shop sits.

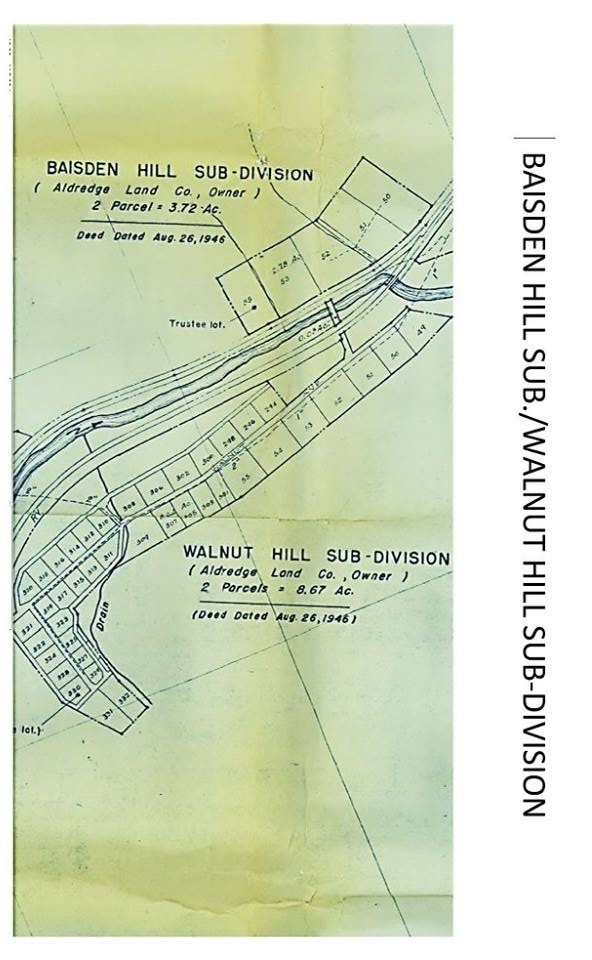
Baisden Hill and Walnut Hill sub-divisions

Currently, there are a Total of 589 Households in the community of Whitman, WV. There were 12 coal camps (grouping of housing built by the Island Creek Coal Company) along Whitman Creek. These coal camps were established about every half mile or so apart (as Mining expanded). Many Coal Camps were divided into subdivisions and subdivisions were divided into parcels or lots. Parcels contained several individual lots. Usually, a subdivision contained 25 to 50 houses. Identified coal camps are (1) Baisden Hill Camp (2) Walnut Hill Camp (3) Hardy Camp (4) Farley Camp (5) Coalwood Camp (6) Kirby Camp (7) Hamill Camp (8) Bradshaw Camp (9) Madison Camp (10) Rothwell Camp (11) Hosmer Camp (12) Huntville Camp.

Boarding houses were built on Whitman Creek to support mining operations. There are currently (2021) four still standing. These are two-story houses with external stairs from bottom porch to top porch. Each room would have an external door onto the porch (many now replaced with windows). These individual rooms were rented by miners. All are now privately owned as single family dwellings. After closure of mines, many homes were built between and around the coal camps filling in the gaps between coal camps.

Other remnants of the coal mining past is an old cut stone building located between Holden No. 3 and No. 14 (1.8 miles up Whitman Creek Road) has been identified as a power station, water house, and powder house is still currently standing (2021).
