= Peach Creek, West Virginia =

- Census-designated place
- Location within West Virginia Location within the United States
- Coordinates: 37°52′28″N 81°59′05″W
- Country: United States
- State: West Virginia
- County: Logan

Area
  - Total: 0.25 sq mi (0.66 km^{2})
  - Land: 0.25 sq mi (0.64 km^{2})
  - Water: 0.0077 sq mi (0.02 km^{2})
- Elevation: 673 ft (205 m)

Population (2020)
  - Total: 185
  - Density: 750/sq mi (290/km^{2})
- Time zone: UTC-5 (Eastern (EST))
  - Summer (DST): UTC-4 (EDT)
- ZIP code: 25639
- Area codes: 304 & 681
- GNIS feature ID: 1544669
- FIPS code: 54-62428

Peach Creek is an unincorporated community and census-designated place (CDP) in Logan County, West Virginia, United States. Peach Creek is located on the east bank of the Guyandotte River across from West Logan. Peach Creek has a post office with ZIP code 25639. The community was first listed as a CDP prior to the 2020 census, in which the population was 185.

The community took its name from Peach Creek, which flows through the center of town.

Peach Creek is also the name of the main location in the Cartoon Network animated series Ed, Edd n Eddy, where the Eds live in the local cul-de-sac in Peach Creek, West Virginia with their friends, the Cul-de-sac kids.
