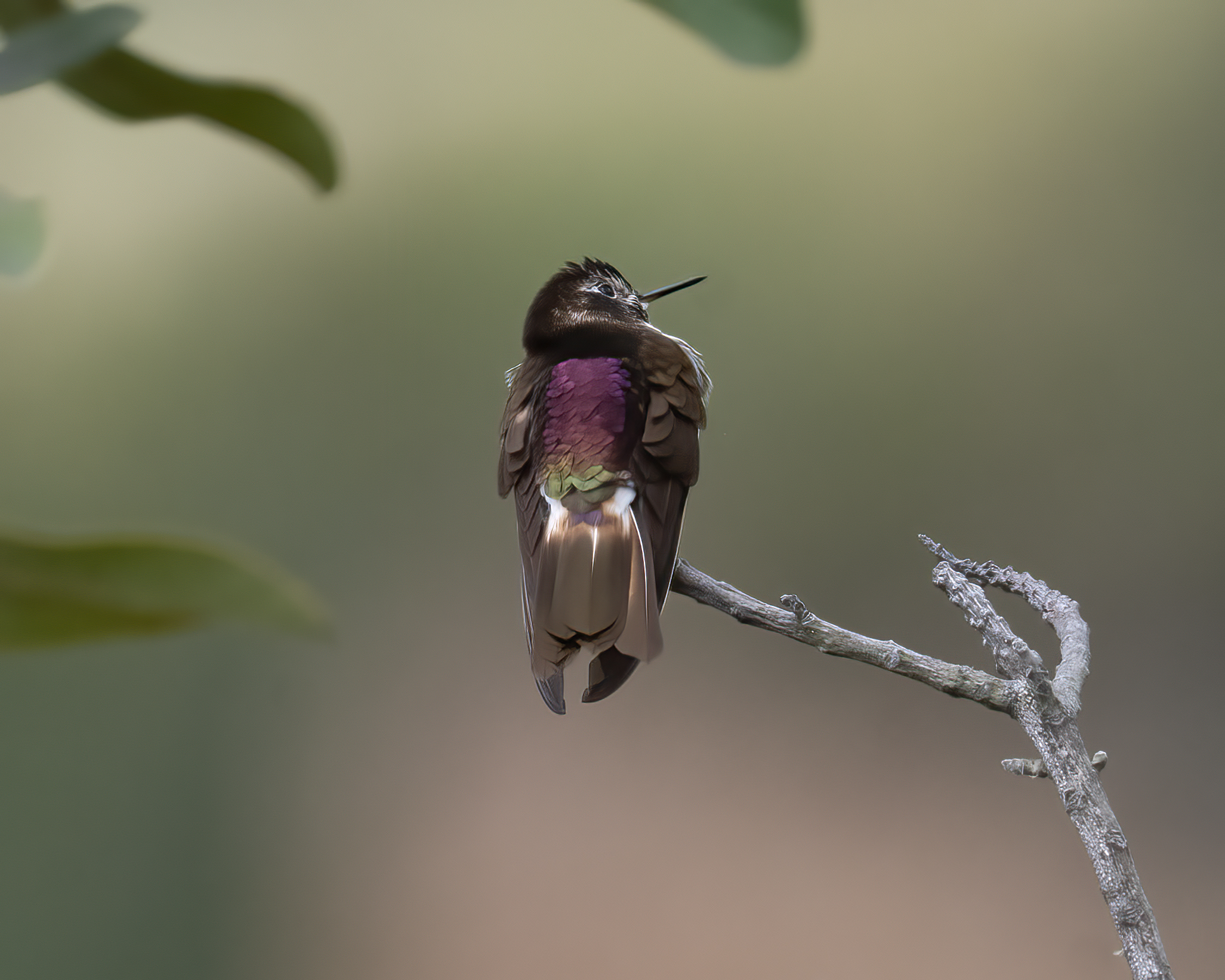

Conservation status
- Vulnerable (IUCN 3.1)
- CITES Appendix II

Scientific classification
- Kingdom: Animalia
- Phylum: Chordata
- Class: Aves
- Order: Apodiformes
- Family: Trochilidae
- Genus: Aglaeactis
- Species: A. aliciae

Binomial name
- Aglaeactis aliciae Salvin, 1896

= Purple-backed sunbeam =

Purple-backed Sunbeam

Species of bird

The purple-backed sunbeam (Aglaeactis aliciae) is a bird species in the family Trochilidae. It is found only in Peru.

Its natural habitats are subtropical or tropical high-altitude shrubland and plantations. It is threatened by habitat loss.

It was formerly classified as Critically Endangered by the IUCN. But new research has shown that although hardly any natural habitat is left, this species is still a bit more numerous than it was believed. Consequently, it is downlisted to Endangered status in 2008 and once again to Vulnerable in 2020.

== Biology ==
The unique shoulder structure of hummingbirds allows the wings to beat tremendously fast in a figure eight motion, allowing the birds to maintain a hovering motion at the same time as feeding, with up to 200 wing beats per second. Due to this highly energetic behavior, hummingbirds feed almost solely on nectar (carbohydrate-rich sugar secretions of plants), feeding on as many as 1,000 to 2,000 flowers a day. Hummingbirds have the highest oxygen necessity of any vertebrate, and due to this, have a breathing rate of up to 500 breaths per minute, as well as distinctively formed lungs. These physiological variations have permitted hummingbirds to occupy a diverse group of habitats and elevations throughout the Americas. There is limited information about the precise biology of the purple-backed sunbeam. However, it has been seen feeding on the orange-red flowers of parasitic mistletoe on Alnus trees, by using its specialized bill and long, sensitive tongue to derive the nectar. Like with most other hummingbirds, the purple-backed sunbeam is said to be solitary, and insistently territorial. Males mate with several females, but have no part in raising the offspring. The female is solely responsible for nest-building, incubation, and nurturing the hatchlings. The purple-backed sunbeam's nest has never been seen, but it is believed that the species build nests close to a nectar source, on branches hidden from direct sunlight. In most hummingbirds, two oval-shaped eggs are laid, which are incubated for around 16 to 19 days. The chicks remain in the nest between 23 and 26 days after hatching.

== Habitat ==
The purple-backed sunbeam is known to live in the temperate zone (2,900-3,500 m) where plant life consists of mountain shrubs and Alnus trees. It feeds on mistletoe alders and other trees, such as Tristerix longebrachteatum, and in patches of flowering uñico, Oreocallis grandiflora. It has also recently been reported to feed and settle in the newly introduced Eucalyptus trees, however, the species' level of tolerance of Eucalyptus plantations (specifically as breeding habitat) is yet to be determined. There are no definite conservation procedures for the purple-backed sunbeam. Additional research is needed to examine the species' ecological requirements, so that the suitability of Eucalyptus plantations can be assessed.

== Ecological Role ==
Flower herbivory and pollination have been described as interactive processes that influence each other in their impact on a plant's reproductive success. In the presence of hummingbirds, undamaged flowers experienced a production that was 1.7-fold higher than for damaged flowers, which suggests that the effect of flower damage on female reproductive success likely happens as a result of hummingbird intolerance for damaged corollas. This result shows that the impact of flower herbivory on plant productiveness was dependent on the presence or absence of hummingbirds. Hummingbirds play an important role of pollinators to many of their food plants, some of which have coevolved with the birds; at least 58 plant families are pollinated in Brazil alone, the main one among them is the Bromeliaceous.

== Threats ==
The greatest threat to the purple-backed sunbeam is the transfer of Alnus dominated shrub land to Eucalyptus plantations. This transfer involves the removal of the parasitic mistletoe on which it feeds. The species' limited range also makes it susceptible to the effects of natural events, such as disease and drought. Historically, the Maranon River landscape has experienced high levels of habitat renovation from cultivation, and much of the original natural habitat has been lost, or continues to be degraded. Cattle ranching, logging and firewood collecting has taken away much of the forest habitat, while oil mining is a latent future concern.

== Population and Conservation Status ==
The low population number, which is estimated at less than 1,000 birds, may indicate that it has an extremely low hereditary diversity. The Maranon valley, habitat to the purple-backed sunbeam, is a region of high preservation importance, as its remoteness and distinctive habitats, have led to a high degree of endemism. A total of twenty two bird species are endemic to the valley, and as a result it has been selected as a Birdlife International Endemic Bird Area (EBA). The Maranon valley has also been selected as part of the Maranon-Alto Mayo Conservation corridor, because it supports a high number of conservation precedence areas. The American Bird Conservancy has been working to analyze the allocation of rare bird species within the Maranon valley, and classify the areas and habitats that need protection. A diverse array of preservation strategies have been proposed, including strict protected area rank, sustainable conservation, and community owned nature reserves. Currently, 0.1 percent of the Maranon valley has any legal defense and these measures need to be implemented immediately.
