= Mitchell Heights, West Virginia =

- Town
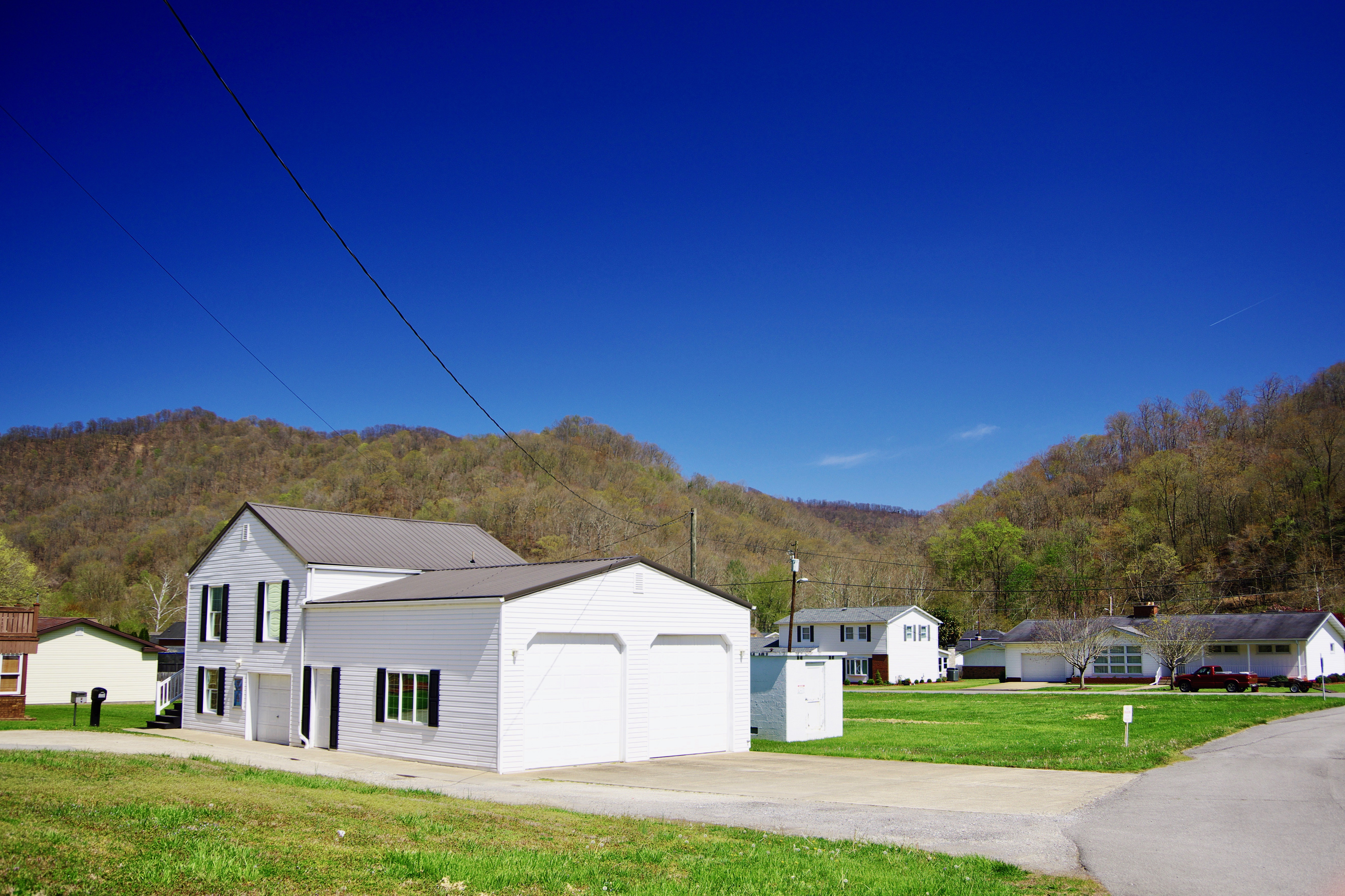
- Town Hall in Mitchell Heights

- Location of Mitchell Heights in Logan County, West Virginia.
- Coordinates: 37°54′25″N 81°58′59″W
- Country: United States
- State: West Virginia
- County: Logan

Area
  - Total: 0.34 sq mi (0.87 km^{2})
  - Land: 0.34 sq mi (0.87 km^{2})
  - Water: 0 sq mi (0.00 km^{2})
- Elevation: 669 ft (204 m)

Population (2020)
  - Total: 314
  - Estimate (2021): 310
  - Density: 812.6/sq mi (313.73/km^{2})
- Time zone: UTC-5 (Eastern (EST))
  - Summer (DST): UTC-4 (EDT)
- Area code: 304
- FIPS code: 54-54892
- GNIS feature ID: 1555140

Mitchell Heights is a town in Logan County, West Virginia, United States. The population was 315 at the 2020 census. The town was named for an early farm on which it was established.

== Geography ==
Mitchell Heights is located at 37°54′25″N 81°58′59″W (37.906889, -81.982981). The town is situated along the west bank of the Guyandotte River in north-central Logan County. Chief Logan State Park borders the town to the west. The community of Henlawson lies to the south, and Pecks Mill lies to the north. West Virginia Route 10 traverses Mitchell Heights, connecting the town with Chapmanville to the north and Logan to the south.

According to the United States Census Bureau, the town has a total area of 0.34 square miles (0.88 km^{2}), all land.

== Demographics ==
Historical population
Census	Pop.	Note	%±
1950	185		—
1960	290		56.8%
1970	524		80.7%
1980	342		−34.7%
1990	265		−22.5%
2000	301		13.6%
2010	323		7.3%
2020	314		−2.8%
2021 (est.)	310	▼	−1.3%
U.S. Decennial Census

=== 2010 census ===
At the 2010 census there were 323 people, 143 households, and 101 families living in the town. The population density was 950.0 inhabitants per square mile (366.8/km^{2}). There were 154 housing units at an average density of 452.9 per square mile (174.9/km^{2}). The racial makeup of the town was 97.8% White, 0.3% African American, 1.5% Asian, and 0.3% from two or more races. Hispanic or Latino of any race were 0.3%.

Of the 143 households 18.9% had children under the age of 18 living with them, 57.3% were married couples living together, 11.2% had a female householder with no husband present, 2.1% had a male householder with no wife present, and 29.4% were non-families. 25.2% of households were one person and 19.6% were one person aged 65 or older. The average household size was 2.26 and the average family size was 2.70.

The median age in the town was 50.2 years. 14.9% of residents were under the age of 18; 5% were between the ages of 18 and 24; 24.4% were from 25 to 44; 27.2% were from 45 to 64; and 28.5% were 65 or older. The gender makeup of the town was 44.6% male and 55.4% female.

=== 2000 census ===
At the 2000 census there were 301 people, 134 households, and 99 families living in the town. The population density was 915.2 inhabitants per square mile (352.2/km^{2}). There were 143 housing units at an average density of 434.8 per square mile (167.3/km^{2}). The racial makeup of the town was 97.01% White and 2.99% Asian. Hispanic or Latino of any race were 0.33%.

Of the 134 households 19.4% had children under the age of 18 living with them, 64.9% were married couples living together, 8.2% had a female householder with no husband present, and 25.4% were non-families. 24.6% of households were one person and 17.2% were one person aged 65 or older. The average household size was 2.25 and the average family size was 2.65.

The age distribution was 15.9% under the age of 18, 4.7% from 18 to 24, 21.6% from 25 to 44, 32.9% from 45 to 64, and 24.9% 65 or older. The median age was 50 years. For every 100 females, there were 78.1 males. For every 100 females age 18 and over, there were 74.5 males.

The median household income was $52,500 and the median family income was $78,404. Males had a median income of $61,250 versus $33,750 for females. The per capita income for the town was $39,603. About 2.4% of families and 3.9% of the population were below the poverty line, including none of those under the age of eighteen and 1.9% of those sixty five or over.
