= Dehue, West Virginia =

Unincorporated community in West Virginia, United States

- Unincorporated community
- Location within West Virginia Location within the United States
- Coordinates: 37°48′22″N 81°54′21″W
- Country: United States
- State: West Virginia
- County: Logan
- Elevation: 810 ft (250 m)
- Time zone: UTC-5 (Eastern (EST))
  - Summer (DST): UTC-4 (EDT)
- Area codes: 304 & 681
- GNIS feature ID: 1554283

Dehue is an unincorporated community in Logan County, West Virginia, United States. Dehue is 5.5 miles (8.9 km) southeast of Logan.

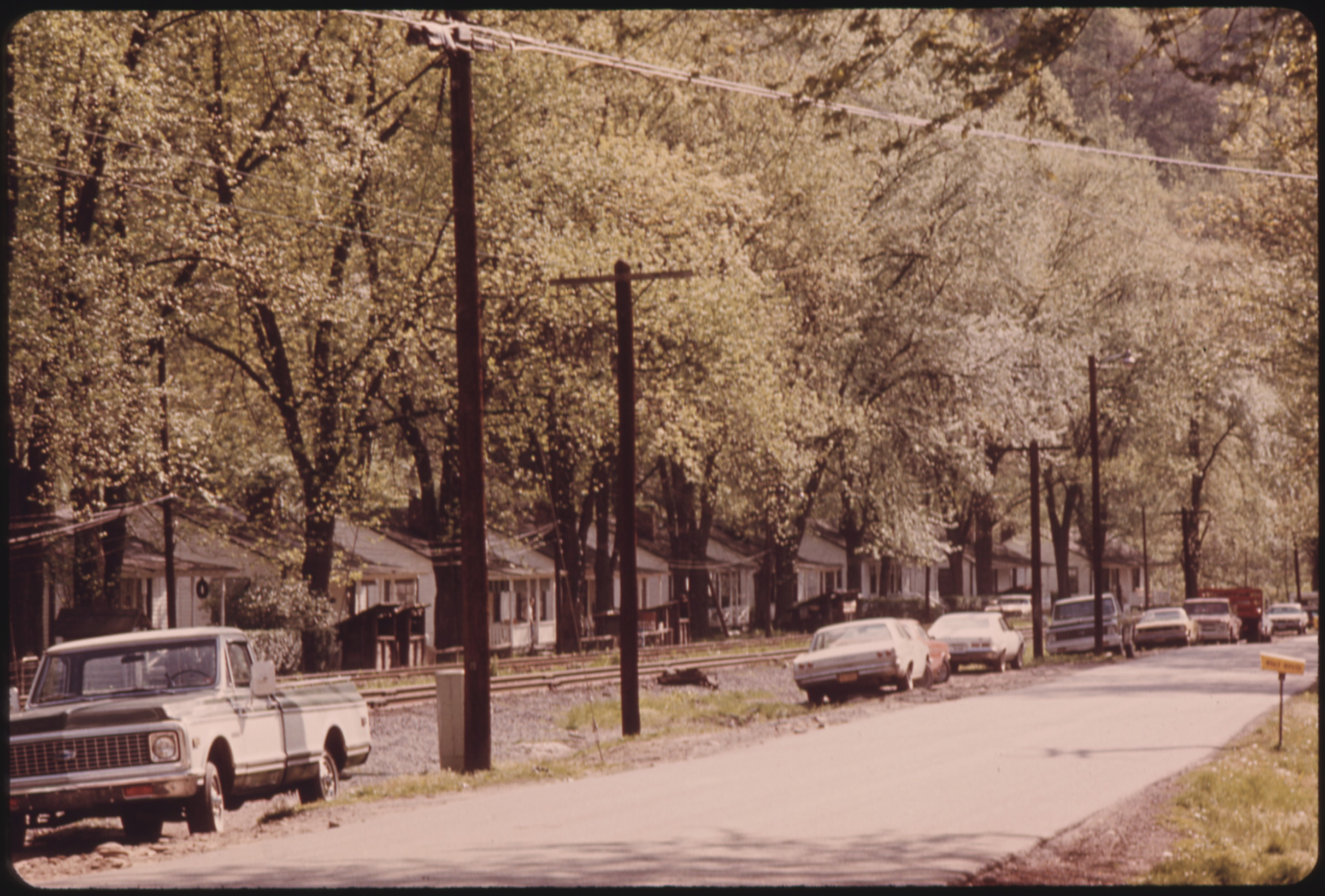
Main Street in Dehue, 1974
