= Peach Creek (West Virginia) =

Stream in West Virginia, U.S.

Coordinates: 37°52′23″N 81°59′08″W

Peach Creek is a stream in the U.S. state of West Virginia.

Peach Creek was named for a peach orchard located along its course.

== See also ==
- List of rivers of West Virginia
