= Orval =

Orval may refer to:

== Places ==
- Orval, Cher, a commune of the Cher département in France
- Orval, Manche, a former commune of the Manche département, in France (now merged with Montchaton into Orval-sur-Sienne)
- Orval-sur-Sienne, a commune of the Manche département, in France
- Orval, a community within the French commune of Montigny-Lengrain
- Orval, Rùm, a hill on Rùm, Inner Hebrides, Scotland

== Other ==
- Orval Abbey - Abbaye Notre-Dame d'Orval, a Trappist monastery in Wallonia, Belgium
  - Orval Brewery, a brewery located in the Trappist Abbaye Notre-Dame d'Orval
    - Orval, a beer produced by the brewery in the Trappist Abbaye Notre-Dame d'Orval
- Orval H. Caldwell (February 15, 1895–February 18, 1972), Chicago-area painter and one-time president of the Art Institute of Chicago
- Orval Faubus, governor of the U.S. state of Arkansas 1955-1967
- Orval Grove, an American baseball player

== See also ==
- Orville (disambiguation)
