= Jean-Baptiste Le Chevalier =

French astronomer, art historian and archaeologist

Jean-Baptiste Le Chevalier (July 1, 1752, in Trelly, Manche department – July 2, 1836, in Paris, Saint-Étienne-du-Mont) was a French scholar, astronomer and archaeologist.

Le Chevalier studied in Paris and taught from 1772 to 1778 at several colleges. He was appointed by the French Ambassador to the Ottoman Empire Choiseul-Gouffier to undertake archaeological research in the region. He visited Italy and the north-west coast of Anatolia, where he devoted his studies particularly to the identification of Troy.

After the outbreak of the French Revolution he returned to France. In 1790 he travelled to London, toured Europe in the following years and returned only in 1795 to France.

In 1806 he was employed as the first curator of the Sainte-Geneviève Library in Paris.

== Publications ==
- Voyage de la Troade, ou table de la plaine de Troie dans son état actuel (London 1794)
  - Reise nach Troas oder Gemählde der Ebene von Troja in ihrem gegenwärtigen Zustande, Altenburg, 1800
- Voyage de la Propontide et du Pont-Euxin (London 1800, 2 Bde.)
  - Reise durch den Propontis und Pontus-Euxinus. Liegnitz und Leipzig: Siegert, 1801.

== Note ==
He is not to be confused with the French traveller Jean-Baptiste Chevalier who was governor of Chandernagore in 1767.
