= Orville =

Orville may refer to:

== People and fictional characters ==
- Orville (given name), a list of people and fictional characters with the name
- Howard Thomas Orville (1901-1960), American naval officer and meteorologist
- Max Orville (born 1962), French politician
- Don Orville, a character in the American sitcom 3rd Rock from the Sun

== Places ==
=== France ===
- Orville, Côte-d'Or, a commune in the Côte-d'Or department
- Orville, Indre, a commune in the Indre department
- Orville, Loiret, a commune in the Loiret department
- Orville, Orne, a former commune in the Orne department
- Orville, Pas-de-Calais, a commune in the Pas-de-Calais department

=== United States ===
- Mount Orville, Alaska, a high peak of the Fairweather Range
- Orville, West Virginia, an unincorporated community

=== Elsewhere ===
- Orville Coast, a portion of the coast of Antarctica

== Other uses ==
- Orville by Gibson, a brand of guitars
- The Orville, a science fiction television series
- Orville (horse), a British Thoroughbred racehorse and sire

== See also ==
- Orrville (disambiguation)
- Orvil (disambiguation)
- Orval (disambiguation)
- Oraville (disambiguation)
- Oroville (disambiguation)
