= Oraville =

Oraville may refer to:

- Oraville, Illinois, United States
- Oraville, Maryland, United States

== See also ==
- Orville (disambiguation)
- Oroville (disambiguation)
- Auroville, experimental community in India
