= Oroville =

Oroville may refer to:

- Oroville, California, United States
- Oroville, Washington, United States

Other uses

- Lake Oroville, in Butte County, California, USA
- Oroville Dam, in Butte County, California, USA
- Oroville Municipal Airport, in Butte County, California, USA

== See also ==
- Oraville (disambiguation)
- Orville (disambiguation)
- Auroville, experimental community in India
