= Orvil =

Orvil may refer to:

- Orvil A. Anderson (1895-1965), pioneer balloonist and United States Air Force major general
- Orvil Dryfoos (1912-1963), Wall Street businessman and publisher of The New York Times from 1961 to 1963
- Ernst Orvil (1898–1985), Norwegian novelist, short story writer, lyricist and playwright
- Orvil Township, Logan County, Illinois
- Orvil Township, New Jersey

== See also ==
- Orville (disambiguation)
