= Hérenguerville =

- Part of Quettreville-sur-Sienne
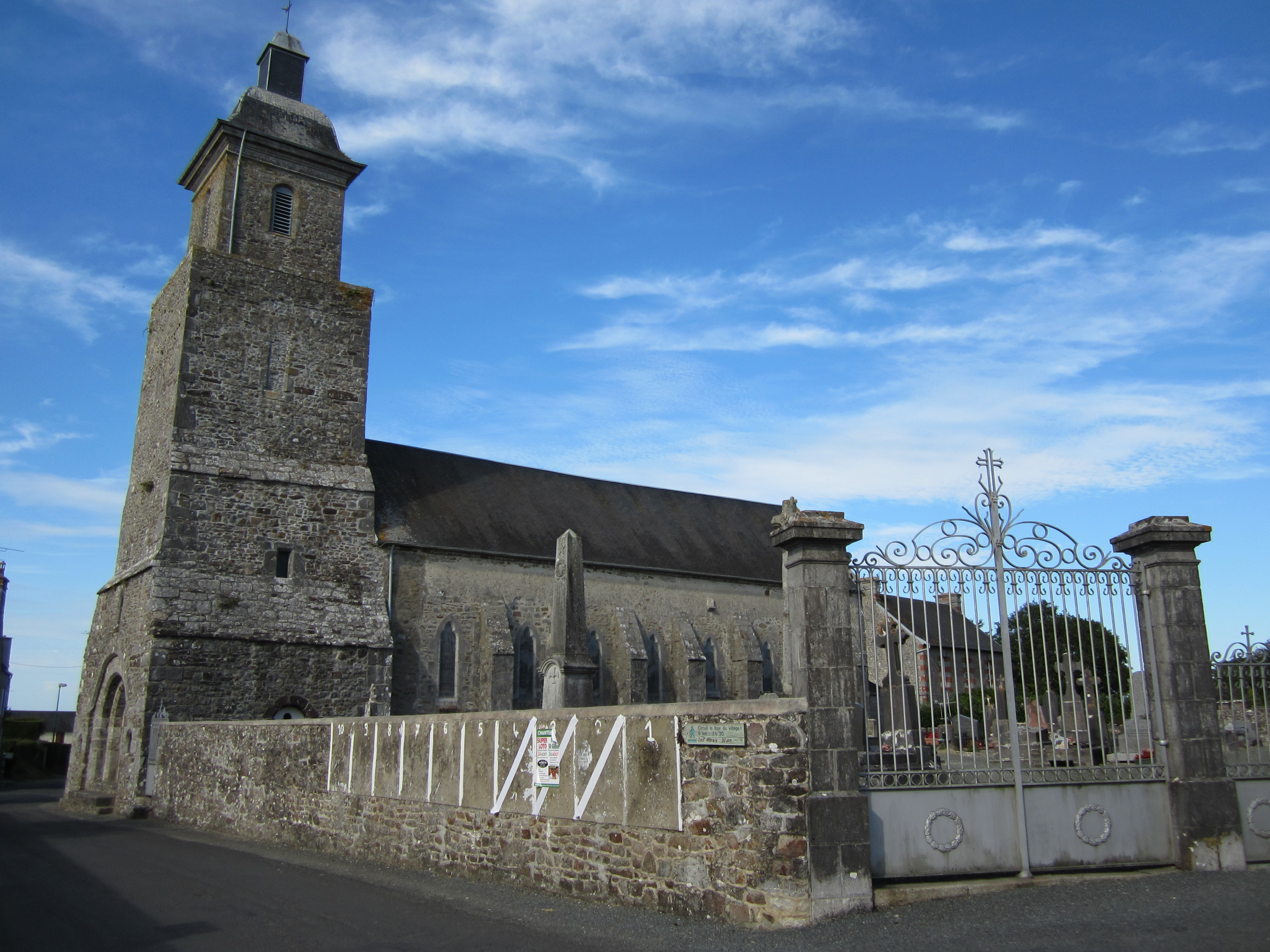
- The church of Saint-Gratien
- Location of Hérenguerville
- Location within France Location within Normandy
- Coordinates: 48°58′40″N 1°30′00″W
- Country: France
- Region: Normandy
- Department: Manche
- Arrondissement: Coutances
- Canton: Quettreville-sur-Sienne
- Commune: Quettreville-sur-Sienne
- Area^{1}: 2.71 km^{2} (1.05 sq mi)
- Elevation: 40 m (130 ft)
- Highest elevation: 56 m (184 ft)
- Lowest elevation: 25 m (82 ft)
- Population (2022): 202
  - Density: 74.5/km^{2} (193/sq mi)
- Time zone: UTC+01:00 (CET)
  - Summer (DST): UTC+02:00 (CEST)
- Postal code: 50660
- ^{1} French Land Register data, which excludes lakes, ponds, glaciers > 1 km^{2} (0.386 sq mi or 247 acres) and river estuaries.

Hérenguerville is a former commune in the Manche department in Normandy in north-western France. On 1 January 2019, it was merged into the commune Quettreville-sur-Sienne.

== See also ==
- Communes of the Manche department
