= Orrville =

Orrville may refer to:

- Orrville, Alabama
- Orrville, Indiana
- Orrville, Ohio

== See also ==
- Orville (disambiguation)
