= Contrières =

- Part of Quettreville-sur-Sienne
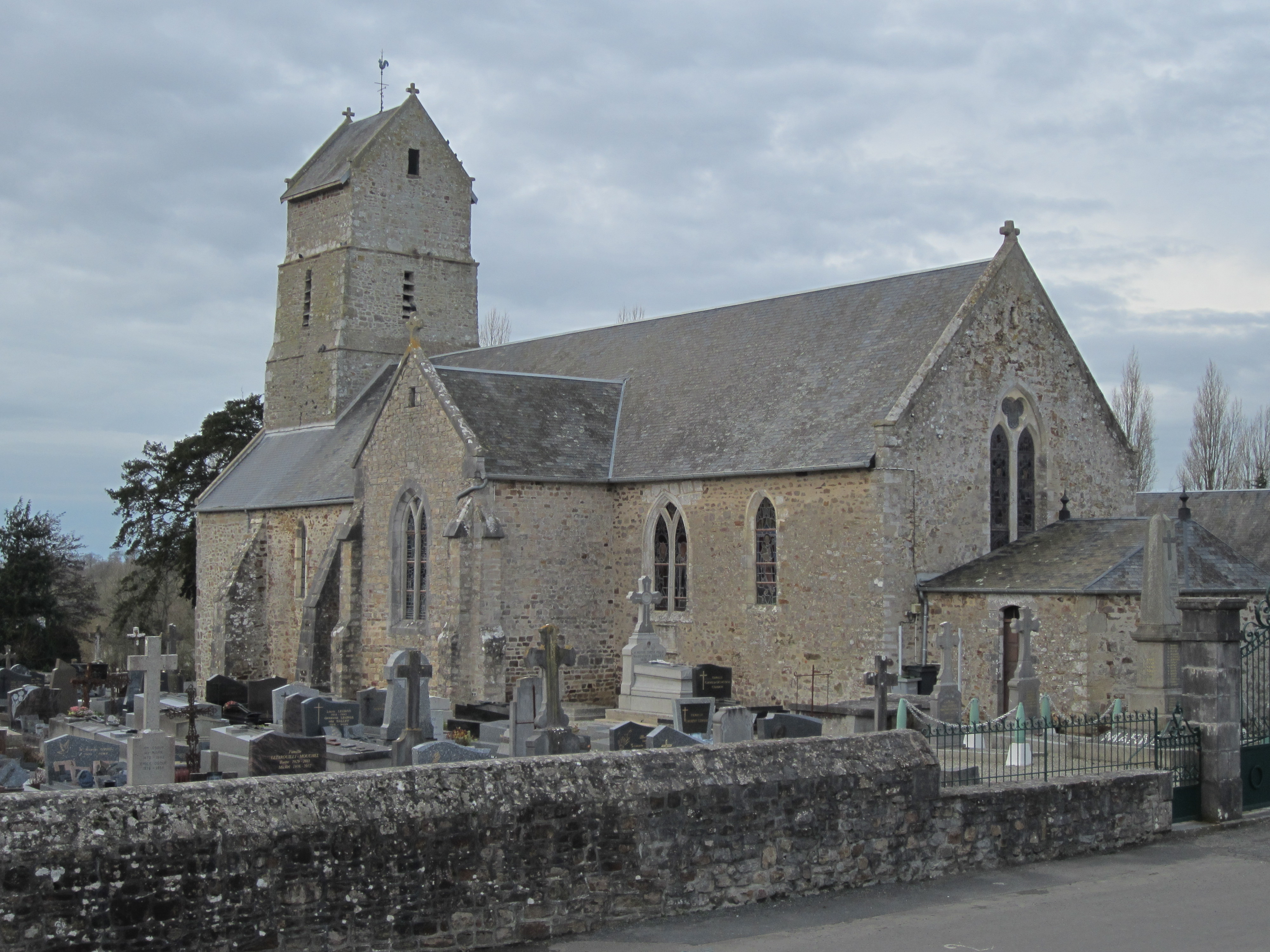
- The church of Sainte-Marguerite
- Location of Contrières
- Location within France Location within Normandy
- Coordinates: 48°59′18″N 1°25′46″W
- Country: France
- Region: Normandy
- Department: Manche
- Arrondissement: Coutances
- Canton: Quettreville-sur-Sienne
- Commune: Quettreville-sur-Sienne
- Area^{1}: 9.12 km^{2} (3.52 sq mi)
- Elevation: 16 m (52 ft)
- Highest elevation: 101 m (331 ft)
- Lowest elevation: 8 m (26 ft)
- Population (2022): 372
  - Density: 40.8/km^{2} (106/sq mi)
- Time zone: UTC+01:00 (CET)
  - Summer (DST): UTC+02:00 (CEST)
- Postal code: 50660
- ^{1} French Land Register data, which excludes lakes, ponds, glaciers > 1 km^{2} (0.386 sq mi or 247 acres) and river estuaries.

Contrières (French pronunciation: [kɔ̃tʁijɛʁ]) is a former commune in the Manche department in Normandy in north-western France. On 1 January 2019, it was merged into the commune Quettreville-sur-Sienne.

== See also ==
- Communes of the Manche department
