= Orval, Manche =

Orval
- Part of Orval-sur-Sienne
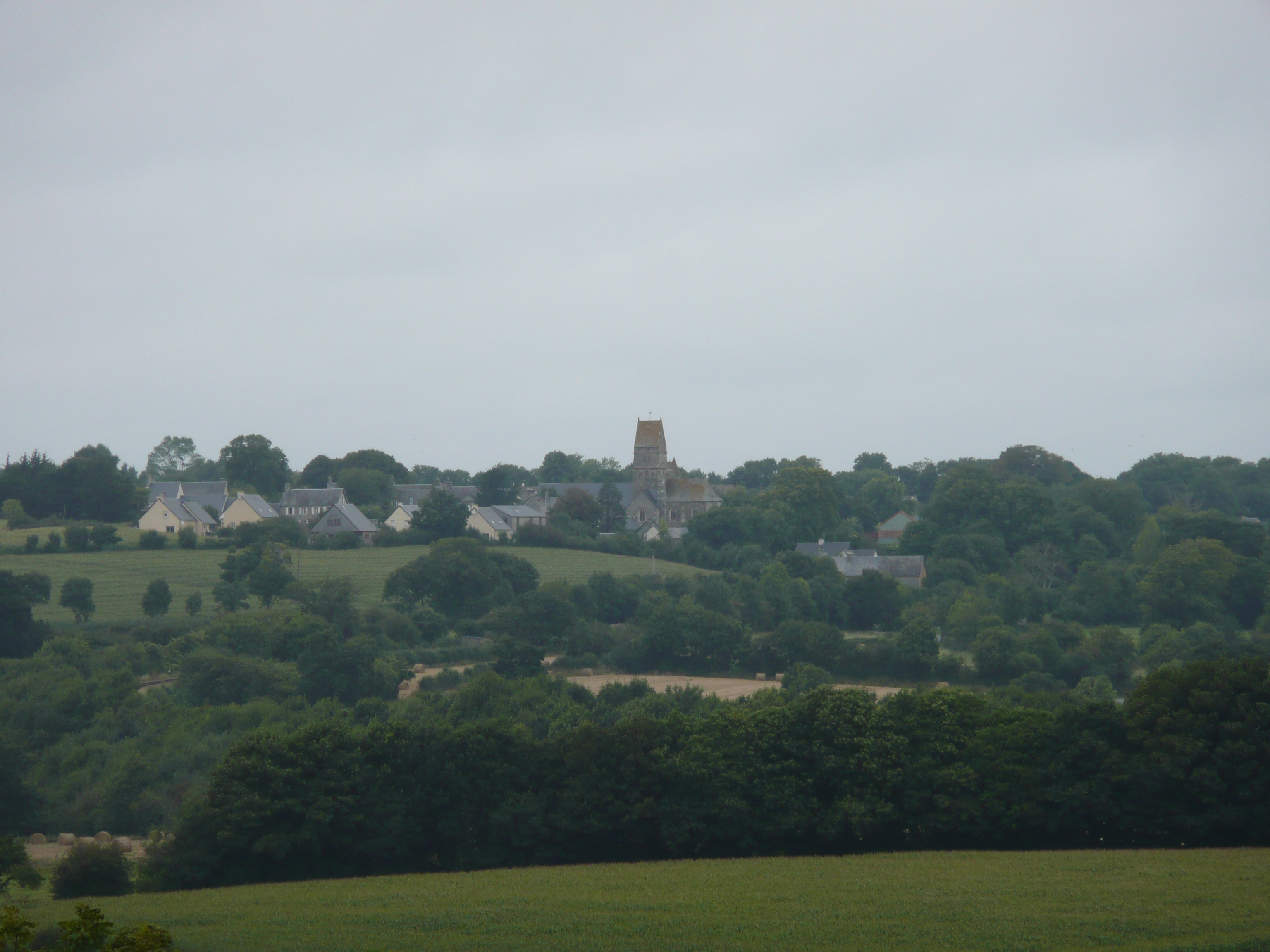
- Orval seen from Hyenville church
- Location of Orval
- Location within France Location within Normandy
- Coordinates: 49°00′54″N 1°28′13″W
- Country: France
- Region: Normandy
- Department: Manche
- Arrondissement: Coutances
- Canton: Coutances
- Commune: Orval-sur-Sienne
- Area^{1}: 12.54 km^{2} (4.84 sq mi)
- Highest elevation: 88 m (289 ft)
- Lowest elevation: 4 m (13 ft)
- Population (2022): 913
  - Density: 72.8/km^{2} (189/sq mi)
- Demonym: Orvalais
- Time zone: UTC+01:00 (CET)
  - Summer (DST): UTC+02:00 (CEST)
- Postal code: 50660
- ^{1} French Land Register data, which excludes lakes, ponds, glaciers > 1 km^{2} (0.386 sq mi or 247 acres) and river estuaries.

Orval (French pronunciation: [ɔʁval]) is a former commune in the Manche department in Normandy in north-western France. On 1 January 2016, it was merged, together with Montchaton, into the new commune of Orval-sur-Sienne.

== See also ==
- Communes of the Manche department
