= Henri Labrouste =

French architect (1801–1875)

- Born: 11 May 1801; Paris
- Died: 24 June 1875 (aged 74); Fontainebleau
- Education: École des Beaux-Arts
- Occupation: Architect
- Awards: Prix de Rome; 1824
- Projects: Sainte-Geneviève Library

Pierre-François-Henri Labrouste (French: [pjɛʁ fʁɑ̃swa ɑ̃ʁi labrust]) (11 May 1801 – 24 June 1875) was a French architect from the famous École des Beaux-Arts school of architecture. After a six-year stay in Rome, Labrouste established an architectural training workshop, which soon became known for rationalism. He became noted for his use of iron-frame construction and was one of the first to realize the importance of its use.

== Biography ==
Born in Paris, Labrouste was one of five children of François-Marie-Alexandre Labrouste, a lawyer and politician from Bordeaux and Anne-Dominique Gourg (1764–1851), daughter and granddaughter of cognac merchants. He entered the Collège Sainte-Barbe as a student in 1809. He was then admitted into the second class and the Lebas-Vaudoyer workshop in the École Royale des Beaux Arts in 1819. In 1820, he was promoted to the first class. Competing for the Grand Prix, Labrouste was awarded second place (the Palais de Justice scored first) by Guillaume-Abel Blouet in 1821.

In 1823, he won the departmental prize and worked as a lieutenant-inspector (sous-inspecteur) for the director Étienne-Hippolyte Godde during the construction of the Saint-Pierre-du-Gros-Caillou parish in Paris. In 1824 Labrouste won the competition with a design of a Court of Appeals (Cour de cassation). In November, he left Paris for Italy, visiting Turin, Milan, Lodi, Piacenza, Parma, Modena, Bologna, Florence and Arezzo.

In July 1835 in Paris he was present at the scene when Giuseppe Marco Fieschi attempted the assassination of King Louis-Philippe using a home-made, multi-barrel gun fired from an upstairs window. Although the King only received a minor injury, 18 people were killed, including Henri's father, Alexandre Labrouste.

== Stay in Rome ==
Receiving a pension or stipend from the French government for five years, he and the other Académie française laureates stayed in the Medici Villa in Rome. The directors of the Académie stated in correspondence in French about the laureates that, in their studies of antiquity, they "must research the laws of proportion and reduce them to formulas to be used by masters and students in Paris."

== Work ==
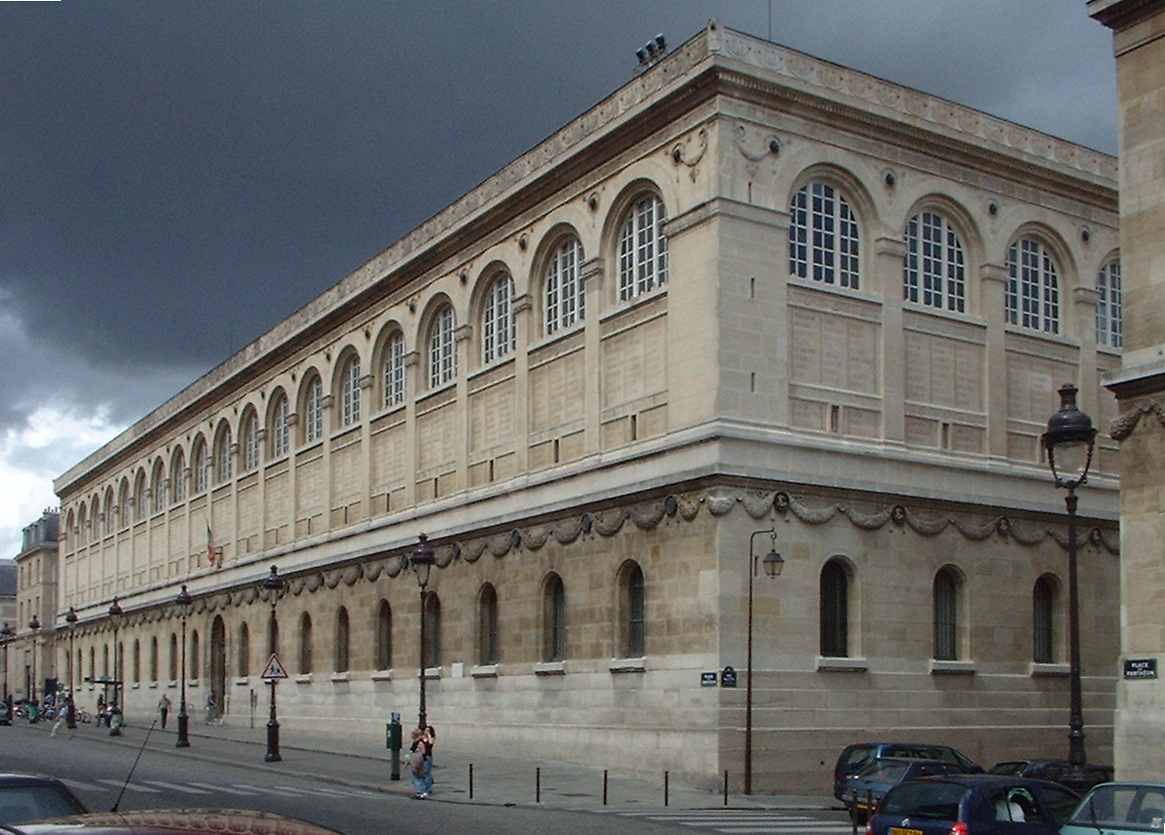
Exterior of the Sainte-Geneviève library in Paris

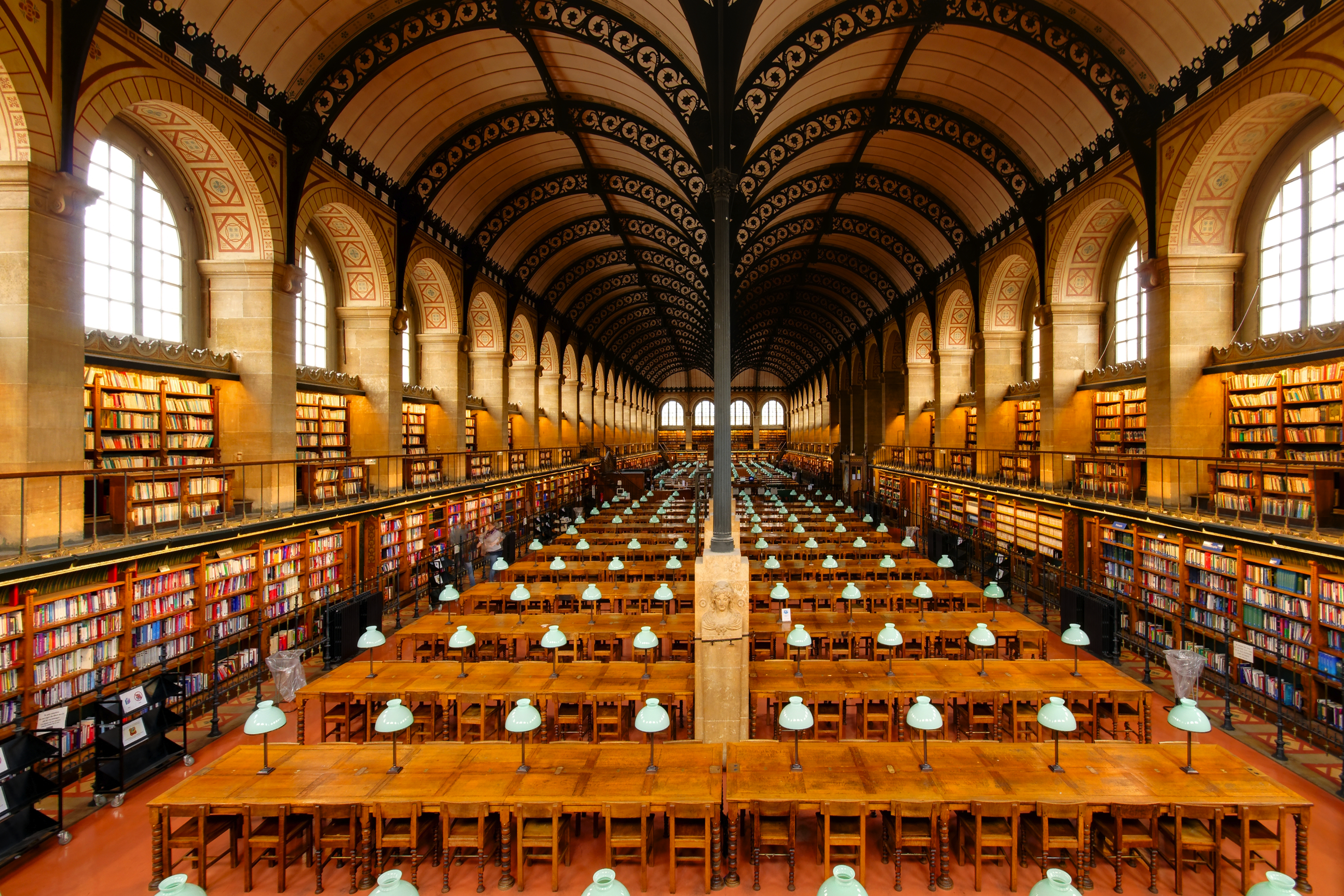
Reading room of the Sainte-Geneviève library in Paris

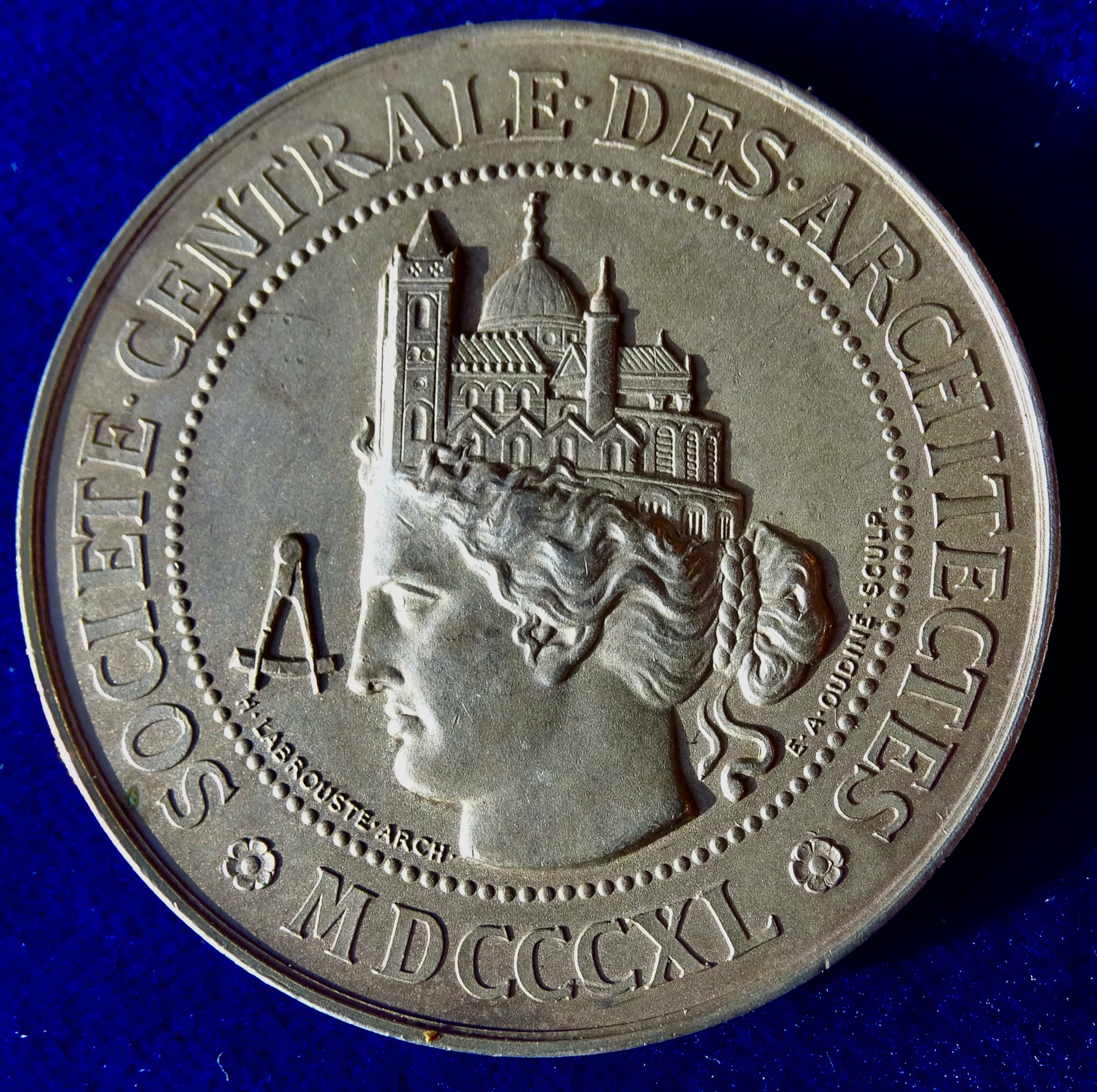
The obverse of a Central Society of Architects silver award medal

His work was the subject of "Henri Labrouste: Structure Brought to Light," the first solo exhibition in the U.S. of his work, at The Museum of Modern Art in New York City.

His buildings include:

- Sainte-Geneviève Library, Paris, built between 1843 and 1850
- The Salle Labrouste, a reading room in the Bibliothèque Nationale de France in the Rue de Richelieu, Paris, and built between 1862 and 1868.

For the Société Centrale des Architectes, today called Académie d'Architecture, Labrouste designed several medals.
