= Guéhébert =

- Part of Quettreville-sur-Sienne
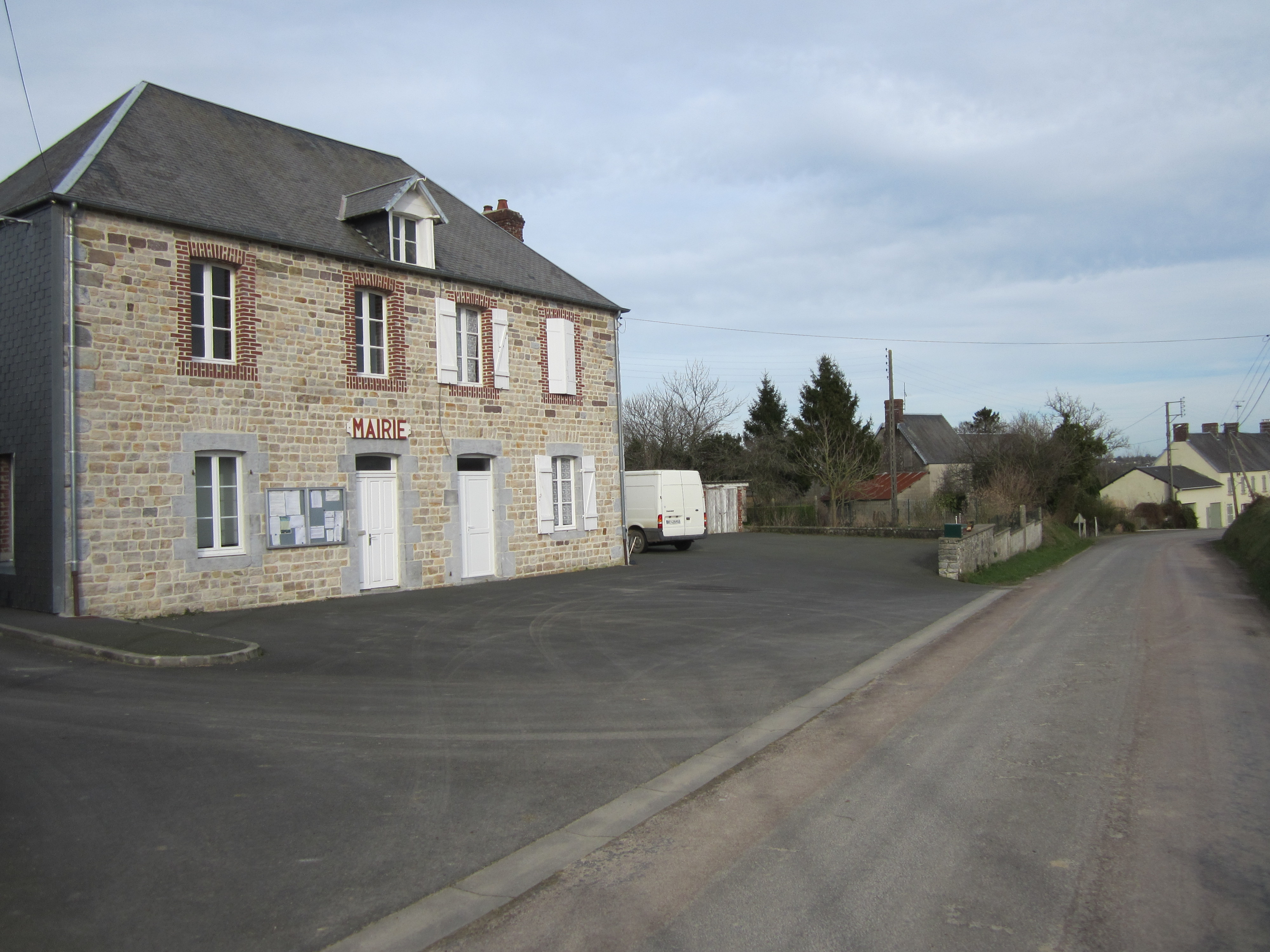
- The village and its town hall
- Location of Guéhébert
- Location within France Location within Normandy
- Coordinates: 48°58′15″N 1°22′20″W
- Country: France
- Region: Normandy
- Department: Manche
- Arrondissement: Coutances
- Canton: Quettreville-sur-Sienne
- Commune: Quettreville-sur-Sienne
- Area^{1}: 6.29 km^{2} (2.43 sq mi)
- Elevation: 67 m (220 ft)
- Highest elevation: 121 m (397 ft)
- Lowest elevation: 25 m (82 ft)
- Population (2022): 136
  - Density: 21.6/km^{2} (56.0/sq mi)
- Time zone: UTC+01:00 (CET)
  - Summer (DST): UTC+02:00 (CEST)
- Postal code: 50210
- ^{1} French Land Register data, which excludes lakes, ponds, glaciers > 1 km^{2} (0.386 sq mi or 247 acres) and river estuaries.

Guéhébert (French pronunciation: [ɡe.ebɛʁ]) is a former commune in the Manche department in Normandy in north-western France. On 1 January 2019, it was merged into the commune Quettreville-sur-Sienne.

== See also ==
- Communes of the Manche department
