= Quettreville-sur-Sienne =

- Commune
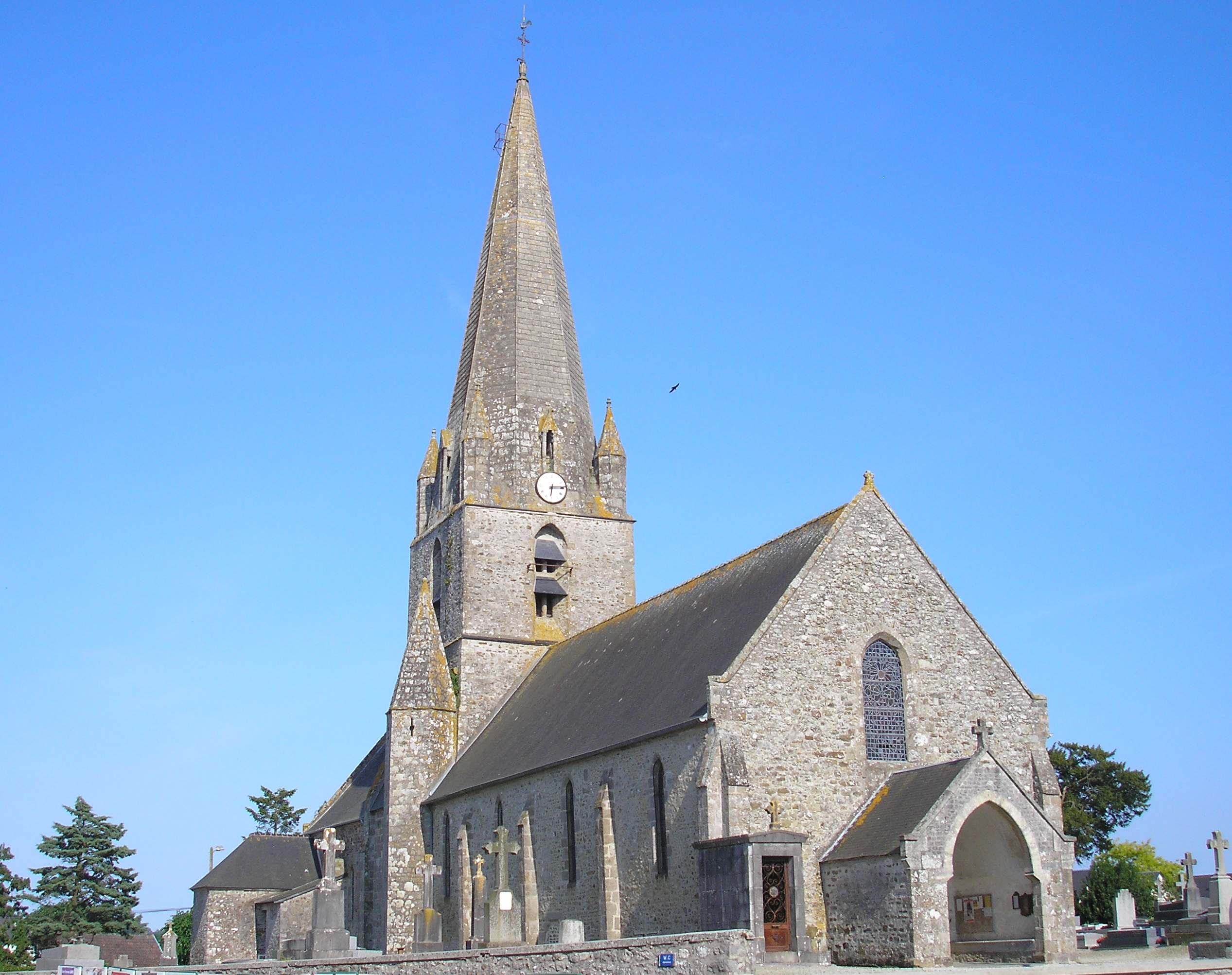
- The church of Notre-Dame-et-Sainte-Agathe
- Location of Quettreville-sur-Sienne
- Location within France Location within Normandy
- Coordinates: 48°58′14″N 1°28′01″W
- Country: France
- Region: Normandy
- Department: Manche
- Arrondissement: Coutances
- Canton: Quettreville-sur-Sienne
- Intercommunality: Coutances Mer et Bocage
- Area^{1}: 49.32 km^{2} (19.04 sq mi)
- Highest elevation: 129 m (423 ft)
- Lowest elevation: 7 m (23 ft)
- Population (2023): 3,167
  - Density: 64.21/km^{2} (166.3/sq mi)
- Time zone: UTC+01:00 (CET)
  - Summer (DST): UTC+02:00 (CEST)
- INSEE/Postal code: 50419 /50660
- Website: www.mairie-quettreville.fr
- ^{1} French Land Register data, which excludes lakes, ponds, glaciers > 1 km^{2} (0.386 sq mi or 247 acres) and river estuaries.

Quettreville-sur-Sienne (French pronunciation: [kɛtʁəvil syʁ sjɛn]) is a commune in the Manche department in north-western France. On 1 January 2016, the former commune of Hyenville was merged into Quettreville-sur-Sienne. On 1 January 2019, the former communes of Contrières, Guéhébert, Hérenguerville and Trelly were merged into Quettreville-sur-Sienne. The river Sienne flows through the town.

== Population ==
Population data refer to the area corresponding with the commune as of January 2025.

Historical population
Year	Pop.	±% p.a.
1968	2,491	—
1975	2,282	−1.24%
1982	2,302	+0.12%
1990	2,456	+0.81%
1999	2,600	+0.64%
2007	2,990	+1.76%
2012	3,139	+0.98%
2017	3,194	+0.35%
2023	3,167	−0.14%
Source: INSEE

== People ==
- Louis Beuve (1869–1949), poet in the Norman language, was a native of the town.

== See also ==
- Communes of the Manche department
