= Orville (given name) =

Orville is a masculine given name created for a character in the novel Evelina by Frances Burney. Meaning golden town or golden settlement. It may refer to:

== People ==
- Orville E. Atwood (1880–1939), American politician
- Orville E. Babcock (1835–1884), American general
- Orville Hickman Browning (1806–1881), American politician
- Orville Bulman (1904-1978), American businessman-turned-painter
- Orville Richard Burrell (born 1968), stage name Shaggy (musician), Jamaican-American singer
- Orville Carlisle (1917–1988), American inventor
- Orville Dewey (1794-1882), American clergyman
- Orville Lloyd Douglas (born 1976), Canadian poet and writer
- Orville Willis Forte IV (born 1970), American actor and writer
- Orville Freeman (1918–2003), American politician
- Orville Frenette (1927–2024), Canadian judge
- Orville Gibson (1856–1918), American guitar maker
- Orville Harrold (1878–1933), American singer
- Orville L. Hubbard (1903–1982), American politician
- Orville Johnson (born 1953), American musician
- Orville R. Leonard (1834–1894), a justice of the Supreme Court of Nevada
- Orville Moody (1933–2008), American golfer
- Orville Nix, witness who filmed John F. Kennedy's assassination
- Orville Peck (born 1988), Canadian country singer
- Orville Howard Phillips (1924–2009), Canadian politician
- Orville H. Platt (1827–1905), American politician
- Orville C. Pratt (1819–1891), American lawyer and judge
- Orville Redenbacher (1907–1995), American businessman
- Orville Wayne Rollins (1912–1991), American businessman, co-founder of Rollins, Inc.
- Orville Schell (born 1940), American sinologist and writer
- Orville Smidt (1943–2025), American politician
- Orville Taylor (born 1970), Jamaican athlete
- Orville Trask (1934–2008), American football player
- Orville Turnquest (born 1929), Bahamian politician
- Orville Vogel (1907–1991), American scientist
- Orville Wright (1871–1948), American inventor and aviator

== Fictional characters ==
- Orville the Duck, a puppet operated by ventriloquist Keith Harris
- Orville Swanson, a character from Red Dead Redemption 2
