= Hyenville =

- Part of Quettreville-sur-Sienne
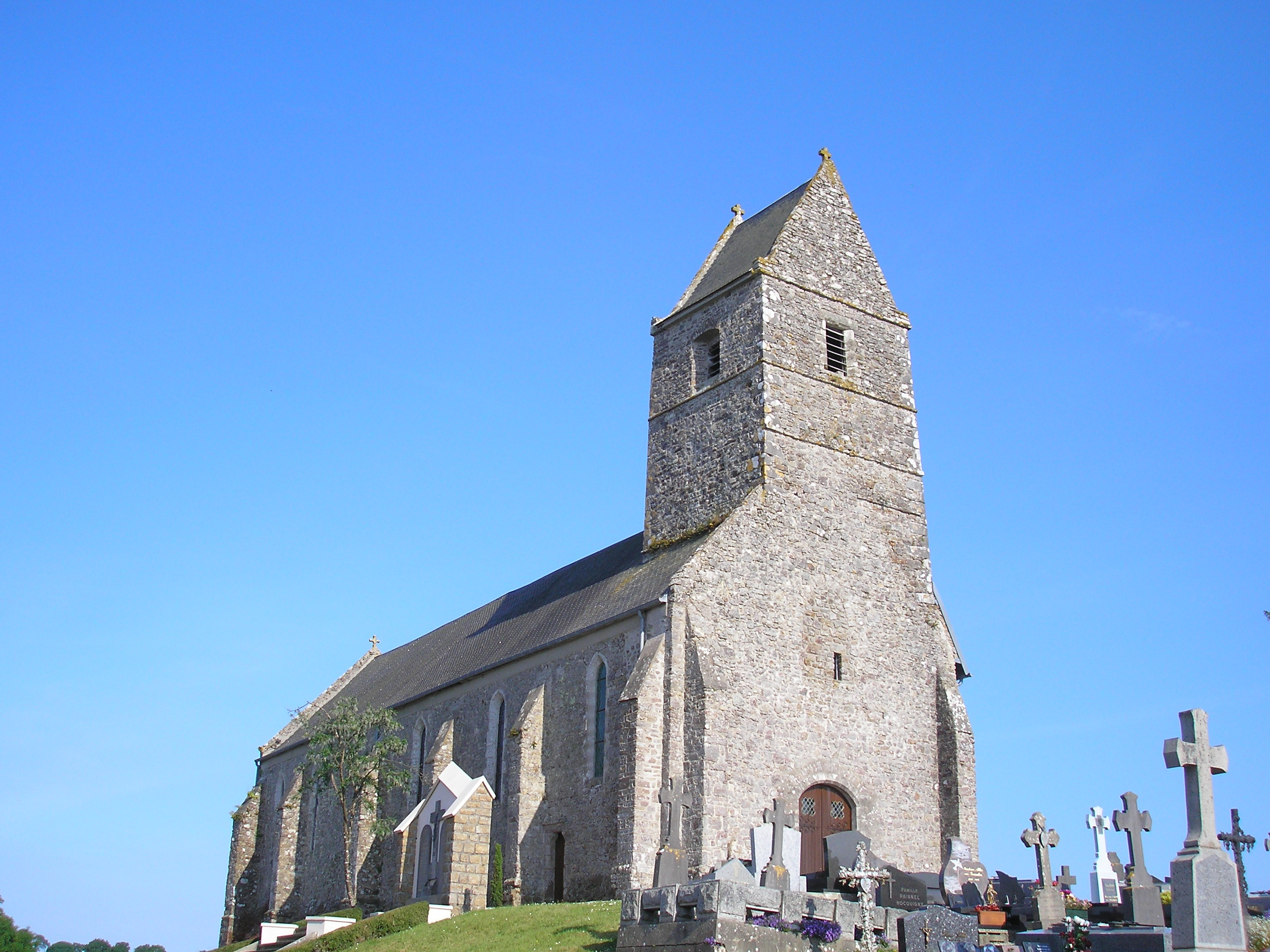
- The church of Saint-Patrice
- Location of Hyenville
- Location within France Location within Normandy
- Coordinates: 48°59′38″N 1°28′01″W
- Country: France
- Region: Normandy
- Department: Manche
- Arrondissement: Coutances
- Canton: Quettreville-sur-Sienne
- Commune: Quettreville-sur-Sienne
- Area^{1}: 3.39 km^{2} (1.31 sq mi)
- Elevation: 16 m (52 ft)
- Highest elevation: 53 m (174 ft)
- Lowest elevation: 7 m (23 ft)
- Population (2022): 364
  - Density: 107/km^{2} (278/sq mi)
- Time zone: UTC+01:00 (CET)
  - Summer (DST): UTC+02:00 (CEST)
- Postal code: 50660
- ^{1} French Land Register data, which excludes lakes, ponds, glaciers > 1 km^{2} (0.386 sq mi or 247 acres) and river estuaries.

Hyenville (French pronunciation: [jɛ̃vil]) is a former commune in the Manche department in north-western France. On 1 January 2016, it was merged into the commune of Quettreville-sur-Sienne. Its population was 364 in 2022.

== See also ==
- Communes of the Manche department
