= Orval-sur-Sienne =

- Commune
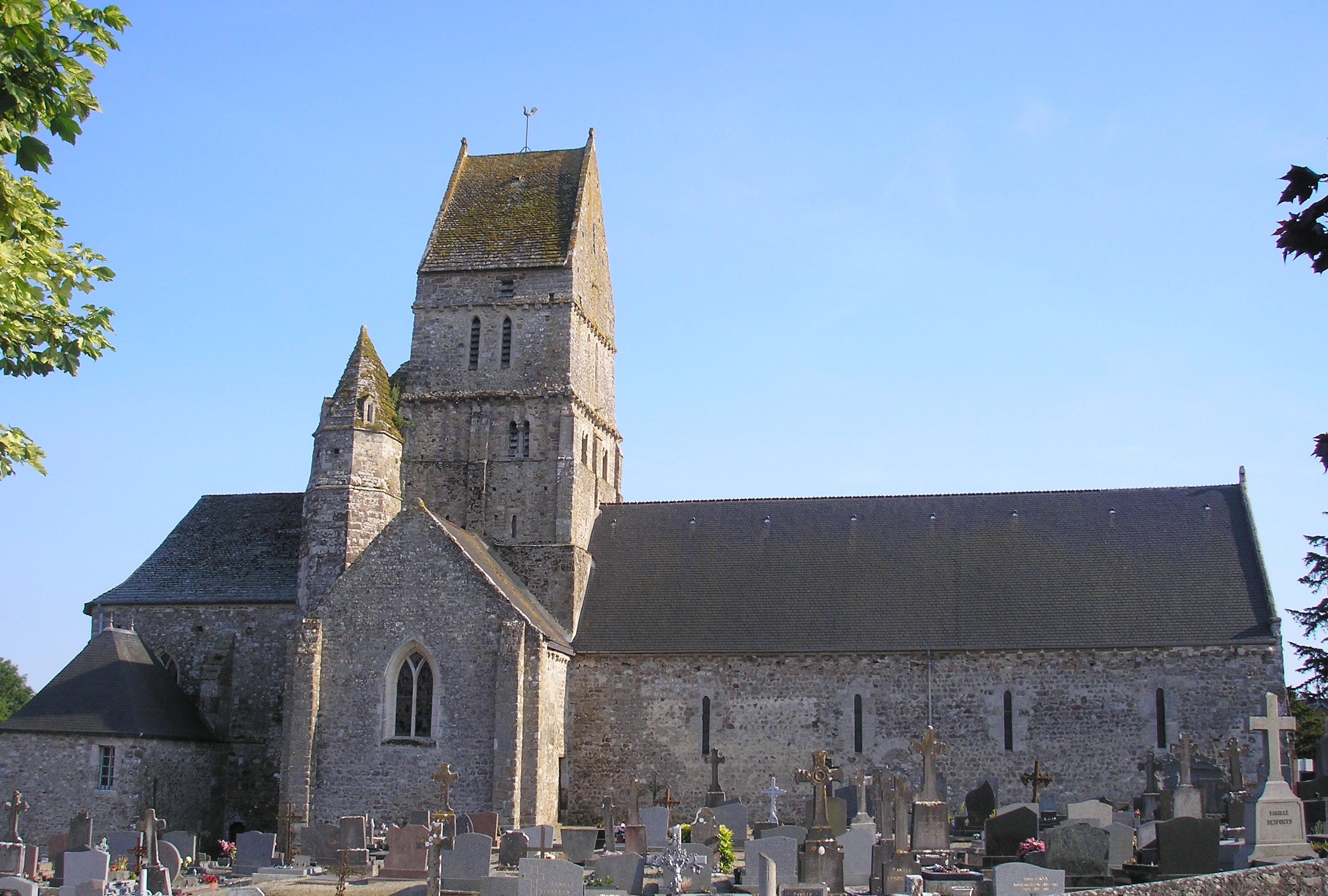
- The church in Orval-sur-Sienne
- Location of Orval-sur-Sienne
- Location within France Location within Normandy
- Coordinates: 49°00′50″N 1°28′16″W
- Country: France
- Region: Normandy
- Department: Manche
- Arrondissement: Coutances
- Canton: Coutances

Government
  - Mayor (2020–2026): Joël Doyère
- Area^{1}: 19.04 km^{2} (7.35 sq mi)
- Population (2023): 1,233
  - Density: 64.76/km^{2} (167.7/sq mi)
- Time zone: UTC+01:00 (CET)
  - Summer (DST): UTC+02:00 (CEST)
- INSEE/Postal code: 50388 /50660
- ^{1} French Land Register data, which excludes lakes, ponds, glaciers > 1 km^{2} (0.386 sq mi or 247 acres) and river estuaries.

Orval-sur-Sienne (French pronunciation: [ɔʁval syʁ sjɛn]) is a commune in the department of Manche, northwestern France. The municipality was established on 1 January 2016 by merger of the former communes of Montchaton and Orval.

== See also ==
- Communes of the Manche department
