= Trelly =

- Part of Quettreville-sur-Sienne
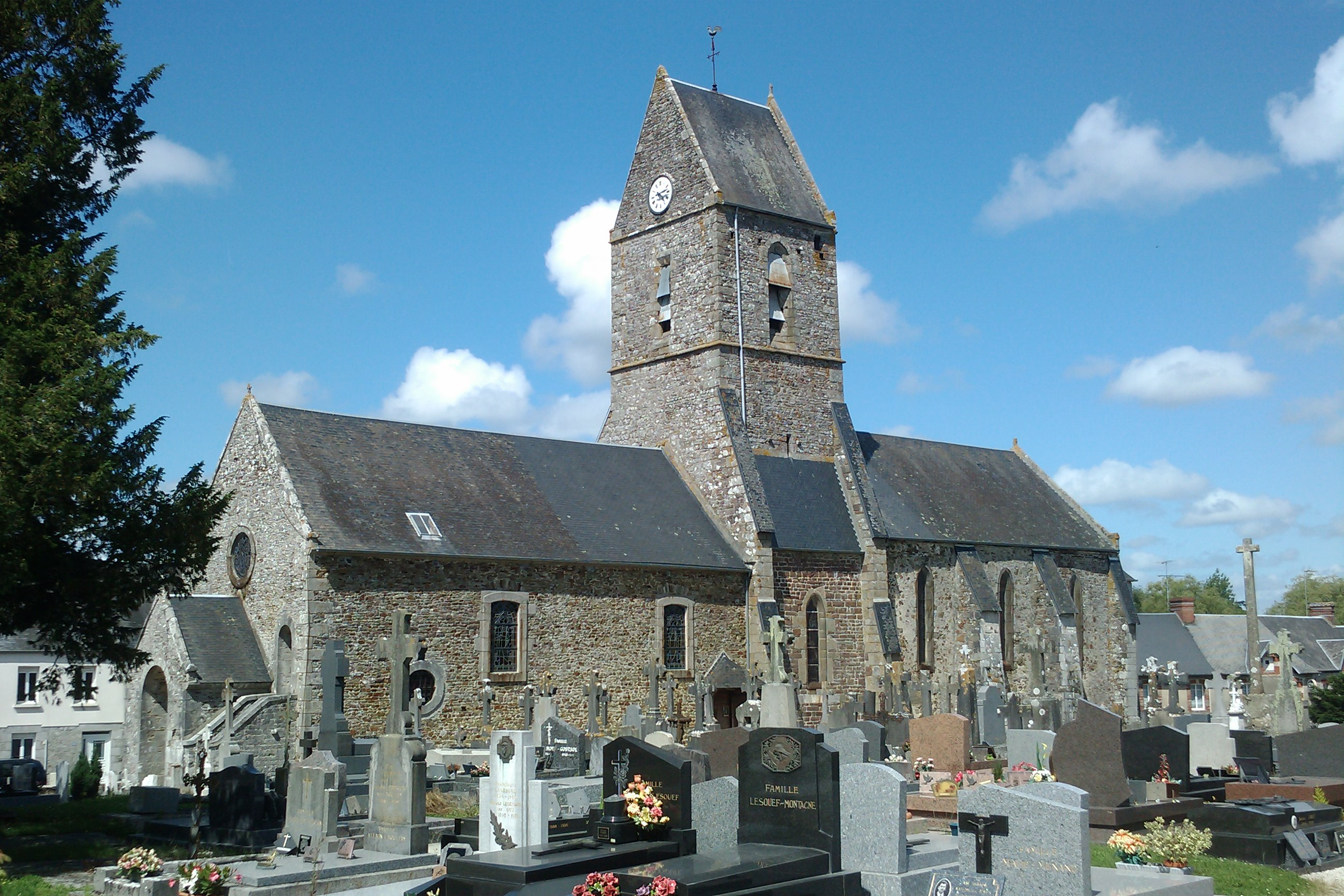
- The church of Saint-Germain
- Location of Trelly
- Location within France Location within Normandy
- Coordinates: 48°57′38″N 1°25′31″W
- Country: France
- Region: Normandy
- Department: Manche
- Arrondissement: Coutances
- Canton: Quettreville-sur-Sienne
- Commune: Quettreville-sur-Sienne
- Area^{1}: 11.77 km^{2} (4.54 sq mi)
- Elevation: 19 m (62 ft)
- Highest elevation: 112 m (367 ft)
- Lowest elevation: 11 m (36 ft)
- Population (2022): 666
  - Density: 56.6/km^{2} (147/sq mi)
- Time zone: UTC+01:00 (CET)
  - Summer (DST): UTC+02:00 (CEST)
- Postal code: 50660
- ^{1} French Land Register data, which excludes lakes, ponds, glaciers > 1 km^{2} (0.386 sq mi or 247 acres) and river estuaries.

Trelly (French pronunciation: [tʁɛli]) is a former commune in the Manche department in Normandy in north-western France. On 1 January 2019, it was merged into the commune Quettreville-sur-Sienne.

== See also ==
- Communes of the Manche department
