= Montchaton =

- Part of Orval-sur-Sienne
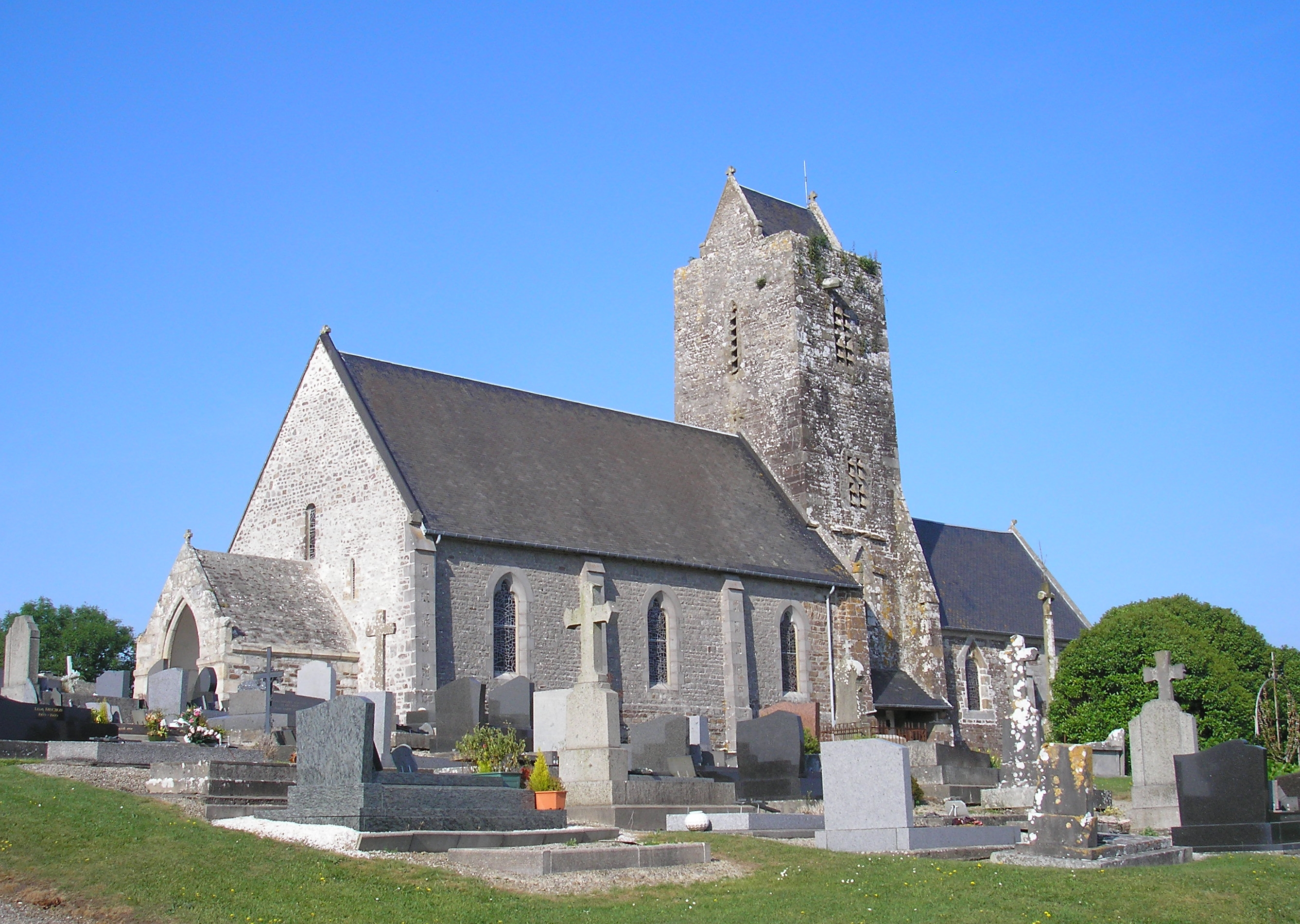
- The church of Saint-Georges
- Location of Montchaton
- Location within France Location within Normandy
- Coordinates: 49°00′34″N 1°29′50″W
- Country: France
- Region: Normandy
- Department: Manche
- Arrondissement: Coutances
- Canton: Coutances
- Commune: Orval-sur-Sienne
- Area^{1}: 6.50 km^{2} (2.51 sq mi)
- Elevation: 51 m (167 ft)
- Highest elevation: 61 m (200 ft)
- Lowest elevation: 5 m (16 ft)
- Population (2022): 309
  - Density: 47.5/km^{2} (123/sq mi)
- Time zone: UTC+01:00 (CET)
  - Summer (DST): UTC+02:00 (CEST)
- Postal code: 50660
- ^{1} French Land Register data, which excludes lakes, ponds, glaciers > 1 km^{2} (0.386 sq mi or 247 acres) and river estuaries.

Montchaton (French pronunciation: [mɔ̃ʃatɔ̃]) is a former commune in the Manche department in Normandy in north-western France. On 1 January 2016, it was merged, together with the commune of Orval, into the new commune of Orval-sur-Sienne.

== Heraldry ==
Arms of Montchaton	The arms of Montchaton are blazoned : Per bend sinister vert and sable, a salmon contourny 'leaping' and a roman helmet argent crested gules, and on a chief gules a cross moline argent.

== See also ==
- Communes of the Manche department
