= 111th Engineer Brigade =

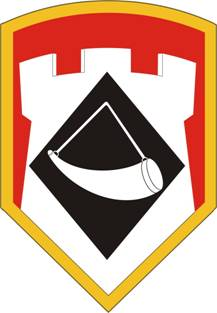
- 111th Engineer Brigade shoulder sleeve insignia
- Active: 2006 - present
- Country: United States
- Branch: United States Army National Guard
- Type: Combat engineer brigade
- Role: Combat Engineering
- Size: Brigade
- Part of: West Virginia National Guard
- Garrison/HQ: Eleanor, West Virginia
- Motto: "Minutemen For Freedom"

Insignia
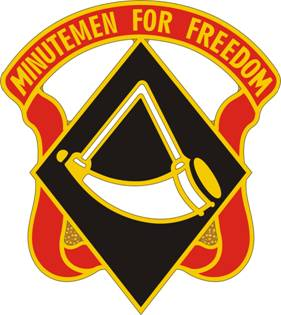
- Distinctive Unit Insignia

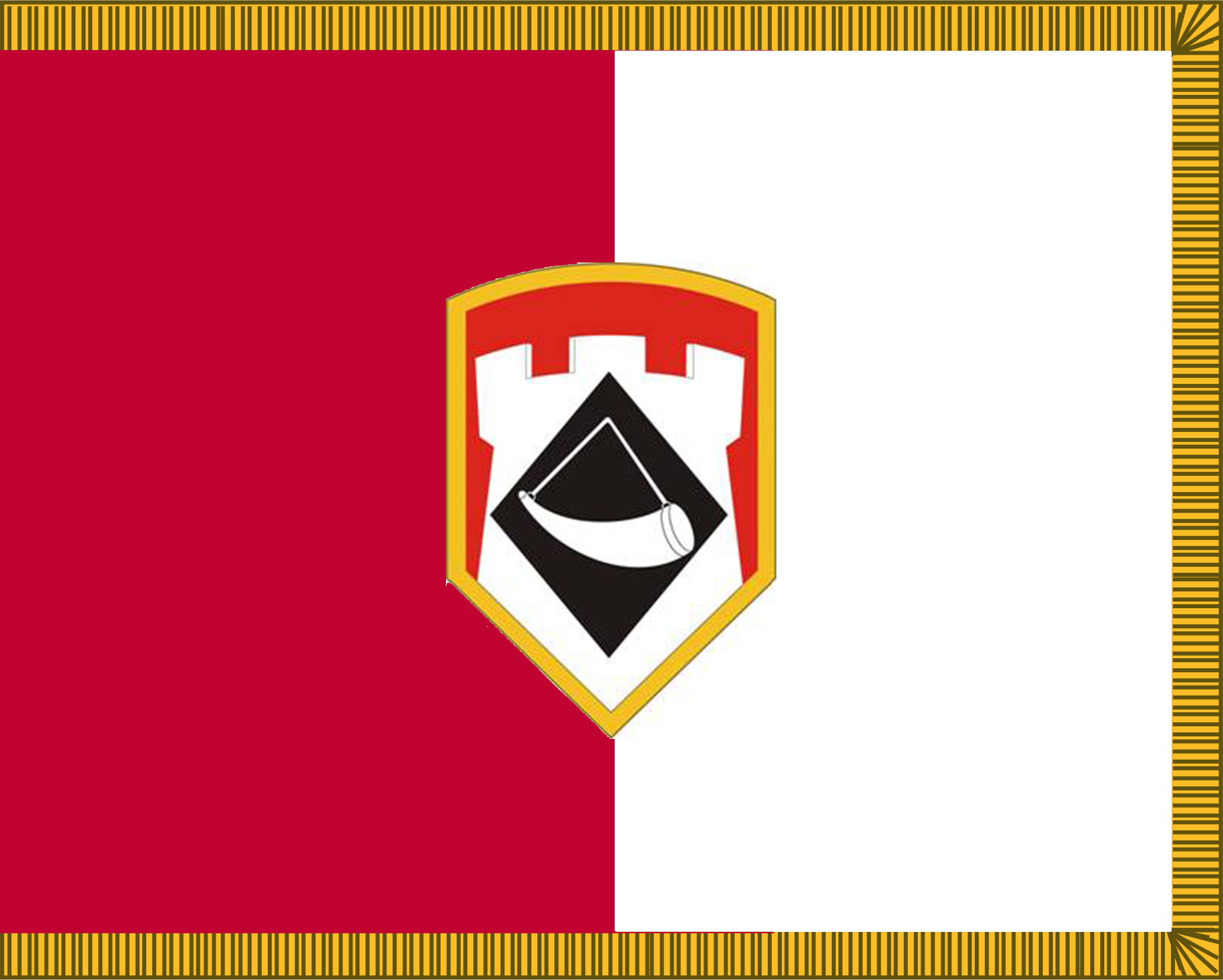
- 111th Engineer Brigade Flag

The 111th Engineer Brigade is an engineer brigade of the United States Army. It is a subordinate unit of the West Virginia Army National Guard with units located throughout West Virginia. It is headquartered at Eleanor, West Virginia, formerly in St. Albans, West Virginia. The 111th Engineer Brigade relocated in 2005 to its new facility at the Winfield Locks and Dam.

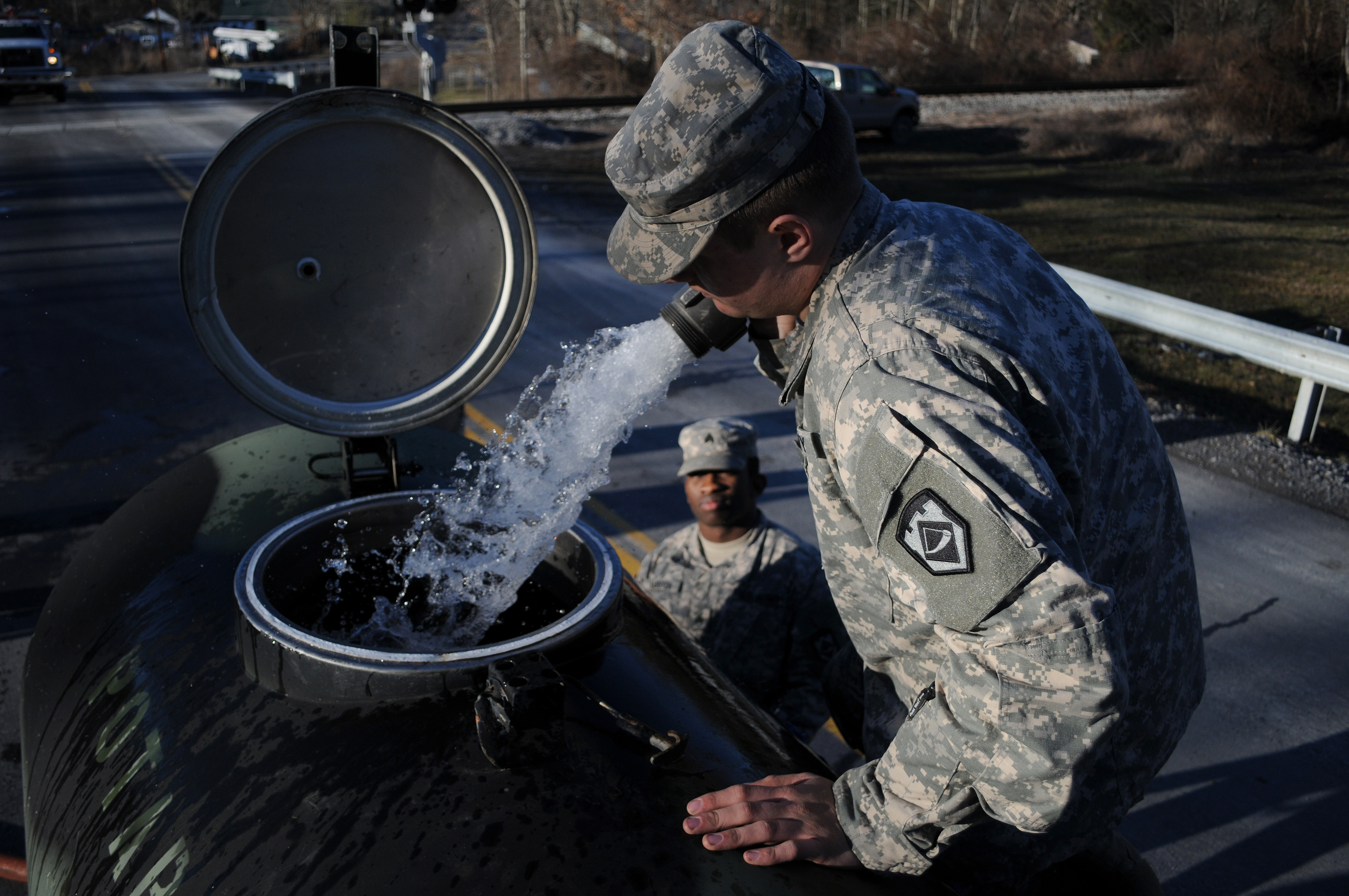
A soldier with the 1257th Transportation Company fills a water buffalo, 2014.

== Insignia ==
DISTINCTIVE BADGE: A gold color metal and enamel device consisting of a black enamel diamond shape bearing a white enamel powder horn, mouth to the right, ferrules and stringed gold, at the top a semi-circular scarlet enamel scroll folded back at each side, terminating behind the diamond shape a base and inscribed at the top "MINUTEMEN FOR FREEDOM" in gold letters. SYMBOLISM: The white powder horn represents the early pioneers, the Greenbrier Long Rifles of the day and the readiness of the present 111th Engineer Brigade. The black diamond shape alludes to the coal fields of West Virginia. Scarlet and white are colors used for Engineer units.

== Organization ==
- 111th Engineer Brigade, in Red House
  - Headquarters and Headquarters Company, 111th Engineer Brigade, in Red House
  - 771st Troop Command Battalion, in Gassaway
    - Headquarters and Headquarters Company, 771st Troop Command Battalion, in Gassaway
    - 156th Military Police Detachment (Law Enforcement), in Holden
    - 157th Military Police Company (Combat Support), in Moorefield
    - 753rd Ordnance Company (EOD), at Camp Dawson
    - 863rd Military Police Company, in Glen Jean
    - 1935th Support Detachment (Contracting Team), in Buckhannon
    - 3664th Ordnance Company (Support Maintenance), in Eleanor
  - 772nd Aviation Troop Command Battalion, at Mid-Ohio Valley Airport
    - Headquarters and Headquarters Company, 772nd Aviation Troop Command Battalion, at Mid-Ohio Valley Airport
    - Company C (MEDEVAC), 2nd Battalion (General Support Aviation), 104th Aviation Regiment, at Mid-Ohio Valley Airport (HH-60L Black Hawk)
      - Detachment 3, Headquarters and Headquarters Company, 2nd Battalion (General Support Aviation), 104th Aviation Regiment, at Mid-Ohio Valley Airport
      - Detachment 3, Company D (AVUM), 2nd Battalion (General Support Aviation), 104th Aviation Regiment, at Mid-Ohio Valley Airport
      - Detachment 3, Company E (Forward Support), 2nd Battalion (General Support Aviation), 104th Aviation Regiment, at Mid-Ohio Valley Airport
    - Company C, 1st Battalion (Assault), 150th Aviation Regiment, at Wheeling Ohio County Airport (UH-60M Black Hawk)
      - Detachment 1, Headquarters and Headquarters Company, 1st Battalion (Assault), 150th Aviation Regiment, at Wheeling Ohio County Airport
      - Detachment 1, Company D (AVUM), 1st Battalion (Assault), 150th Aviation Regiment, at Wheeling Ohio County Airport
      - Detachment 1, Company E (Forward Support), 1st Battalion (Assault), 150th Aviation Regiment, at Wheeling Ohio County Airport
    - Company B, 1st Battalion (Security & Support), 224th Aviation Regiment, at Mid-Ohio Valley Airport (UH-72A Lakota)
    - Detachment 28, Operational Support Airlift Activity, at Mid-Ohio Valley Airport (C-12 Huron)
    - Detachment 5, Company B (AVIM), 248th Aviation Support Battalion, at Wheeling Ohio County Airport
  - 1092nd Engineer Battalion, in Parkersburg
    - Headquarters and Headquarters Company, 1092nd Engineer Battalion, in Parkersburg
    - Forward Support Company, 1092nd Engineer Battalion, in Parkersburg
    - 115th Engineer Company (Vertical Construction Company), in Clarksburg
      - Detachment 1, 115th Engineer Company (Vertical Construction Company), at Camp Dawson
    - 119th Engineer Company (Sapper), in Moundsville
    - 601st Engineer Company (Engineer Support Company), in Buckhannon
    - 821st Engineer Company (Engineer Construction Company), in Summersville
      - Detachment 1, 821st Engineer Company (Engineer Construction Company), in Parkersburg
    - 922nd Engineer Detachment (Utilities), in Martinsburg
    - 1257th Engineer Detachment (Fire Fighting Team — Fire Truck), at Camp Dawson
    - 1863rd Quartermaster Platoon (Field Feeding), in Buckhannon
