= West Virginia National Guard =

Military of the U.S. state of West Virginia

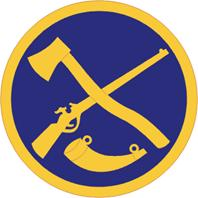
- West Virginia Army National Guard STARC SSI
- Active: 1947 - present (current form)
- Country: United States
- Allegiance: West Virginia
- Branch: United States Army; United States Air Force
- Type: Reserve force Militia
- Role: United States Army National Guard; United States Air National Guard
- Garrison/HQ: Charleston, West Virginia
- Mottos: Pret Toujours Pret "Ready, Always Ready!"
- Engagements: American Civil War; West Virginia Mine Wars; World War II; War in Afghanistan
- Decorations: List of decorations

Commanders
- Civilian leadership: Governor Patrick Morrisey (Commander-in-Chief); Governor Patrick Morrisey (Governor of the State of West Virginia)
- State military leadership: Major General James D. Seward (Adjutant General); Command Sergeant Major James D. Jones (Senior Enlisted Advisor)

Insignia
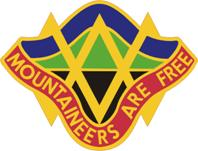
- Unit insignia

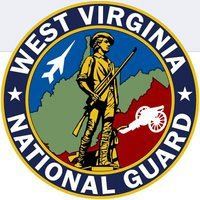
- Seal of the West Virginia National Guard

- West Virginia National Guard Crest

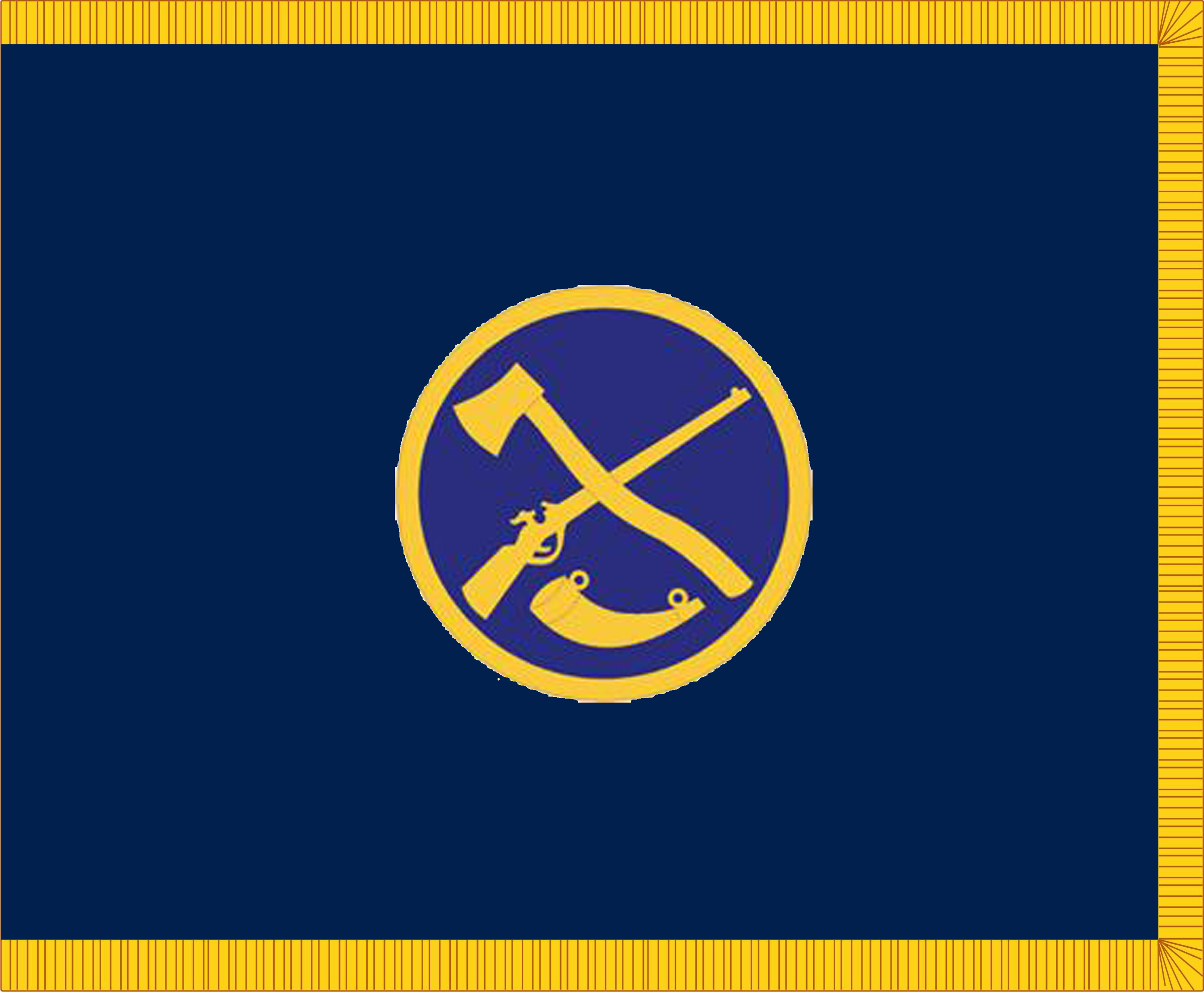
- West Virginia National Guard Headquarters Flag

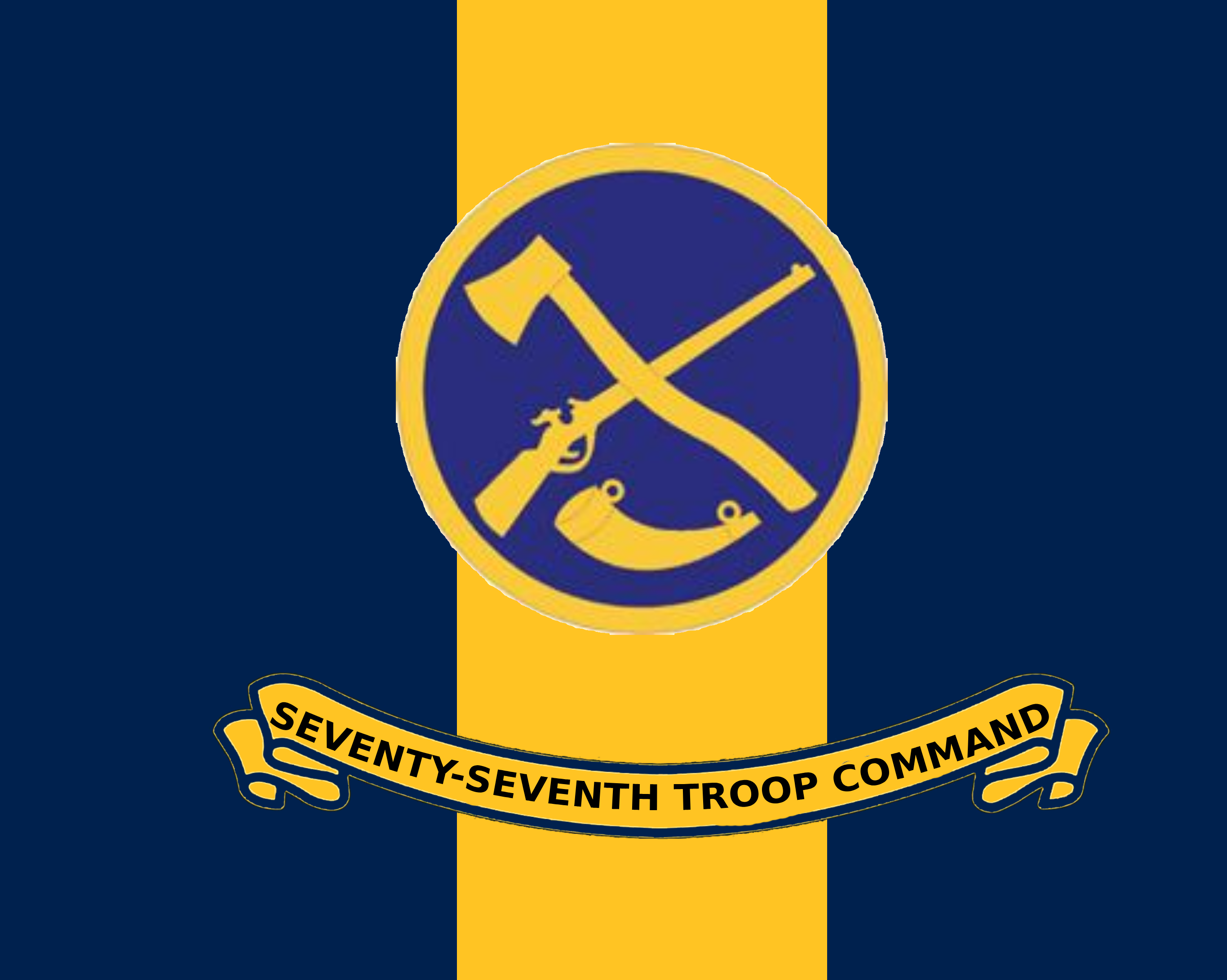
- West Virginia National Guard 77th Troop Command Flag

The West Virginia National Guard is a part of the West Virginia Department of Military Affairs and Public Safety. It comprises the West Virginia Army National Guard and the West Virginia Air National Guard. Unlike some states, West Virginia does not maintain a state defense force, nor is there a naval component to the state's military forces.

The oldest active regiment in the U.S. Army (active, Reserve and National Guard) is the 201st Field Artillery, the "First West Virginia," founded in 1735 as a Virginia militia regiment.

== History ==
The West Virginia National Guard traces its heritage to the 1735 militia company established in Berkeley County by Morgan Morgan. Originally formed for protection against Indian raids, militia units were quickly mobilized when necessary in war time. Militia units provided frontier service in the French and Indian War and during Dunmore’s War. Men from Western Virginia fought on all fronts in the Revolutionary War.

=== 19th century ===
During the War of 1812, Western Virginia militia units took part in the Northwest campaigns, and one company of Cabell County troops fought alongside Andrew Jackson at the Battle of New Orleans in 1815. Cabell, Berkeley, and Jefferson counties provided infantry regiments for service in the Mexican War of 1846-1848.

In 1861, the 81st Virginia General Assembly voted to secede from the United States following the Battle of Fort Sumter. However, opposition to secession and slavery as well as anti-Confederate, Pro-Union sentiments were strong in Northwestern Virginia. The counties that now compose of present-day West Virginia voted to secede from Virginia and establish their own separate, pro-Union state, and the West Virginia National Guard's separate identity truly began to coalesce during this period. West Virginia provided some 40,000 men for service in both Northern and Southern forces. Many enlisted in the regiments of bordering states, especially Kentucky, Ohio, Pennsylvania, and Virginia. These troops primarily saw service on West Virginia soil or in the Valley of Virginia. Federal and Confederate units from West Virginia were present at both the first land battle of the war at Philippi and at the Confederate surrender at Appomattox.

A few ceremonial and social militia companies were formed after the Civil War, but the state did nothing to encourage their formation. Although violence during the Railroad Strike of 1877 led industrialists to plead for more militia companies, organization of the militia continued to be slow due to a lack of popular and legislative support. However, national labor problems and the formation of the National Guard Association as a lobbying group resulted in federal legislation that furnished funding and material for Guard companies. In 1889, the West Virginia legislature renamed the militia the West Virginia National Guard and provided state support. The First Infantry Regiment was organized in northern West Virginia and the Second Infantry Regiment in southern West Virginia.

In 1898, the two regiments were merged into one for service in the Spanish-American War. The First West Virginia Volunteer Infantry was stationed in Georgia. Later, another regiment was formed, the Second West Virginia Volunteer Infantry, which served in Pennsylvania during the war.

=== Late 19th & 20th century ===
The militia or National Guard was activated for service in areas of labor unrest in 1877, 1880, 1894, 1902, and 1912. Though there were hundreds of strikes during this period, most were controlled by local police authorities. When this failed, troops were called to duty. The most prolonged service took place in 1902 when a national coal strike brought miners out in the New River Gorge, and in 1912–13 when miners struck for union recognition on Paint and Cabin creeks in Kanawha County. Martial law was declared for the strike zone in 1912, and miners and mine guards were sentenced to prison for various violations. ‘‘Mother’’ Jones was among those brought before the court-martial.

In 1916, the West Virginia National Guard was activated in response to President Woodrow Wilson’s call for troops to pursue Pancho Villa on the Mexican border. Again, the regiments were merged and the Second West Virginia Volunteer Infantry was sent to the border. After several months the unit returned home, only to be federalized within weeks for service in World War I. The Second Regiment and a newly recruited First Regiment were absorbed into the 38th Infantry Division. The Second Regiment was reorganized and redesignated as the 150th Infantry while the First Regiment was broken up into support units. The 150th Infantry landed in Europe at the end of the war and saw no action in that conflict.

One of the West Virginian National Guard's most infamous actions was when it took part in the Battle of Blair Mountain during the West Virginia Mine Wars, the largest labor uprising in American history. It played a key role in the suppression of the labor revolt, backing the mine owners alongside other state, federal, and privately-hired forces.

Following World War I, the 150th and 201st Infantry Regiments were organized in southern and northern West Virginia, respectively. These units were federalized in January 1941 as President Franklin D. Roosevelt prepared the nation for war. The 150th spent World War II defending the Panama Canal while the 201st provided the first line of defense for the Aleutian Islands. The National Guard was dramatically changed after World War II. Artillery units, transportation, and engineering units were added to the 150th Infantry Regiment. Probably the biggest change, however, was the addition of a combat fighter squadron, bringing an important aviation component to the Guard

Since World War II, the Army and Air National Guard has served in a number of capacities, lending aid to West Virginians during natural disasters caused by periodic flooding and to victims of the coal refuse dam break on Buffalo Creek in 1972. As part of its military mission, elements of the West Virginia Army and Air National Guard were activated for duty during the Korean War, the war in Vietnam, the Gulf War of 1991, the Iraq War, in support of the peacekeeping mission to Bosnia in 1997–98, and more recent conflicts in Iraq and Afghanistan.

=== 21st century ===
The West Virginia National Guard was mobilized more frequently after the attack on the World Trade Center on September 11, 2001, than at any other time in its history. Elements of the West Virginia Army and Air National Guard served in action in Afghanistan and in Iraq.

The West Virginia National Guard was mobilized in support of reelected U.S. president Donald Trump's National Guard deployments in Washington, D.C. in 2025. On November 26, 2025, two members of The West Virginia National Guard were critically injured after the 2025 Washington, D.C. National Guard shooting. One of the two Guardsmen, 20-year-old Specialist Sarah Beckstrom, died from the injuries sustained. There is currently one suspect in custody.

== Leadership ==
The leadership of the West Virginia National Guard includes:

- Adjutant General: MAJ GEN James Seward, WVARNG
- Director, Joint Staff: BRIG GEN Patrick Chard, WVANG
- Senior Enlisted Leader: CSM James D. Jones, WVARNG
- Assistant Adjutant General for Army: BG Murray E. Holt II, WVARNG
- Command Sergeant Major: CSM Aaron T. Kincaid, WVANG
- Assistant Adjutant General for Air: Brig Gen David V. Cochran, WVANG
- Command Chief Master Sergeant: CWO Daniel J. Hutchins, WVANG

== West Virginia Army National Guard ==
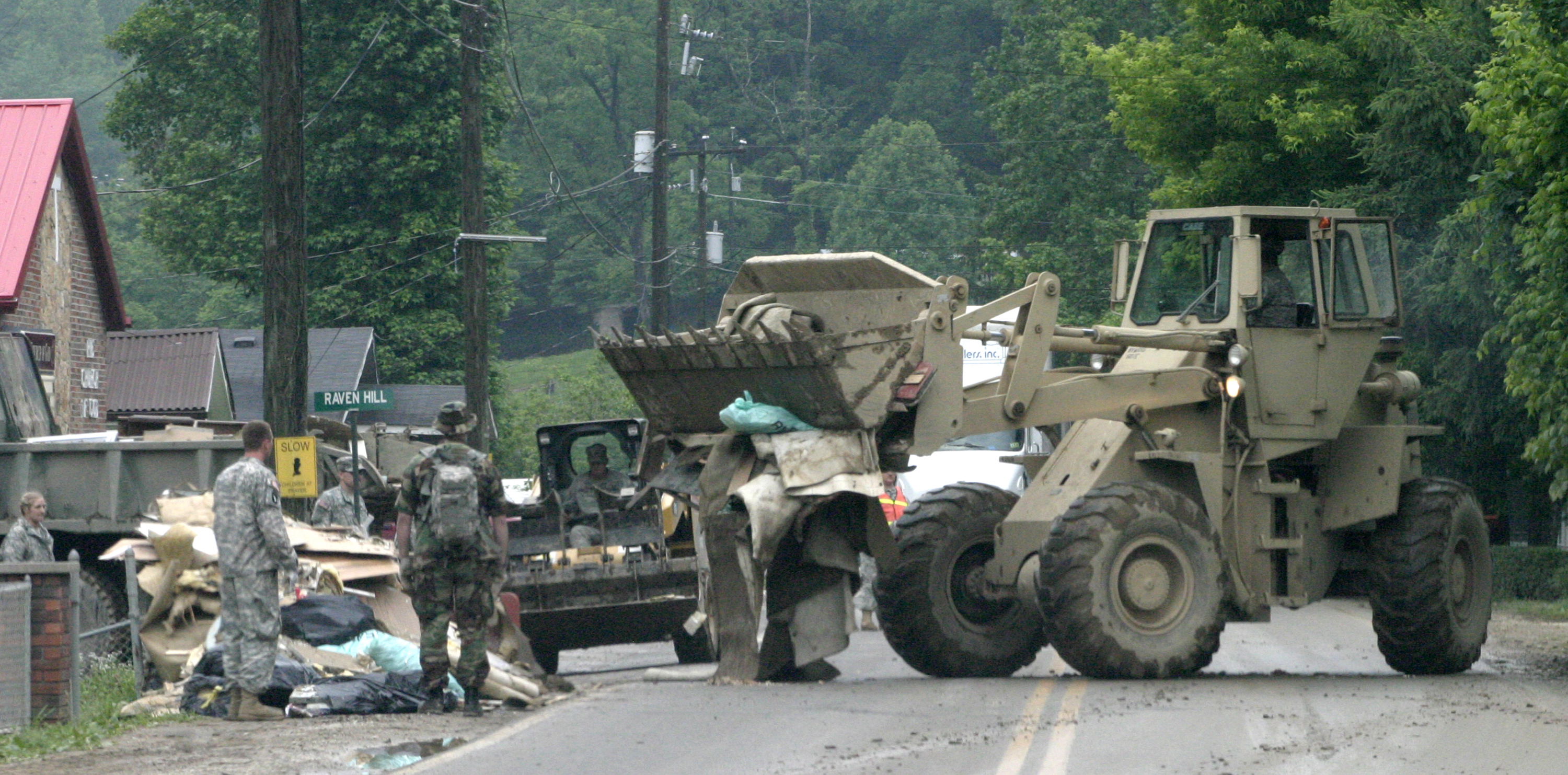
West Virginia National Guardsmen clearing flood debris from the side of a highway at Hanover, WV, May 29, 2009

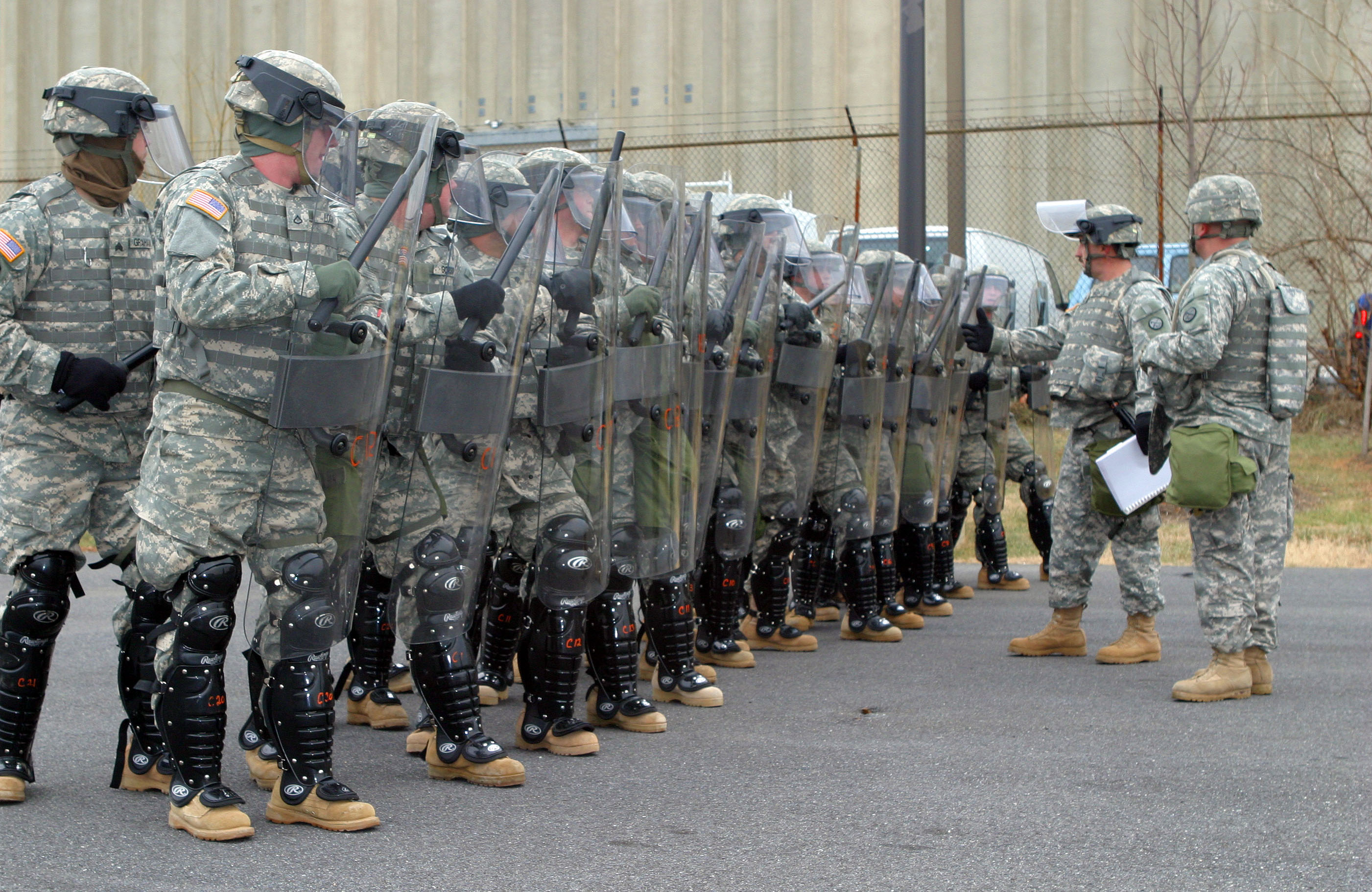
Troops of the WVARNG Quick Reaction Force training in Washington, D.C. just prior to the 2009 presidential inauguration

The West Virginia Army National Guard (WVARNG) is the United States Army component of the West Virginia National Guard. It has 38 units and activities stationed in 22 counties throughout West Virginia and overseas. The WV ARNG is supporting Homeland Security activities, and has deployed troops as part of Operation Iraqi Freedom in Iraq, Operation Enduring Freedom in Afghanistan and the Horn of Africa, and peace keeping missions in Kosovo.

The WVARNG has a three-fold mission:

- (a) Federal Mission: As a Reserve Component of the Army, maintain combat ready units and Soldiers who are available to mobilize in support of the U.S. National Military Strategy;
- (b) State Mission: Provide organized, trained and equipment units to protect life and property and to preserve peace, order and public safety when ordered by the governor; and
- (c) Community Mission: To add value to the communities in which we live, work and serve.

=== Organization ===
As of February 2026 the West Virginia Army National Guard consists of the following units:

- Joint Force Headquarters-West Virginia, Army Element, in Charleston
  - Headquarters and Headquarters Detachment, Joint Force Headquarters-West Virginia, Army Element, in Charleston
  - West Virginia Recruiting & Retention Battalion, in Charleston
  - West Virginia Medical Detachment, in South Charleston
  - 153rd Public Affairs Detachment, in Charleston
  - 249th Army Band, in Morgantown
  - Special Operations Detachment-Europe (Airborne), at Camp Dawson
  - Camp Dawson Training Center, in Kingwood
  - Army Aviation Support Facility #1, at Mid-Ohio Valley Airport
  - Army Aviation Support Facility #2 Wheeling, at Wheeling Ohio County Airport
  - Combined Support Maintenance Shop #1, in Eleanor
  - Field Maintenance Shop #4, at Camp Dawson
  - Field Maintenance Shop #7, in Kenova
  - 77th Troop Command, in Glen Jean
    - Headquarters and Headquarters Detachment, 77th Troop Command, in Glen Jean
    - 2nd Battalion, 19th Special Forces Group (Airborne), in Kenova
      - Headquarters and Headquarters Detachment, 2nd Battalion, 19th Special Forces Group (Airborne), in Kenova
      - Company A, 2nd Battalion, 19th Special Forces Group (Airborne), in Middletown (RI) — (Rhode Island Army National Guard)
      - Company B, 2nd Battalion, 19th Special Forces Group (Airborne), in Columbus (OH) — (Ohio Army National Guard)
      - Company C, 2nd Battalion, 19th Special Forces Group (Airborne), at Camp Dawson
      - Company D (Support), 2nd Battalion, 19th Special Forces Group (Airborne), in Kenova
      - Company E (Forward Support), 2nd Battalion, 19th Special Forces Group (Airborne), in Kenova
      - 1528th Forward Support Company (Special Operations) (Airborne), in Martinsburg
    - 1st Squadron, 150th Cavalry Regiment, in Bluefield (part of 30th Armored Brigade Combat Team)
      - Headquarters and Headquarters Troop, 1st Squadron, 150th Cavalry Regiment, in Bluefield
      - Troop A, 1st Squadron, 150th Cavalry Regiment, in Holden
        - Detachment 1, Troop A, 1st Squadron, 150th Cavalry Regiment, in Gassaway
      - Troop B, 1st Squadron, 150th Cavalry Regiment, in Red House
      - Troop C, 1st Squadron, 150th Cavalry Regiment, in Glen Jean
      - Troop D (Tank), 1st Squadron, 150th Cavalry Regiment, in Sanford (NC) — (North Carolina Army National Guard)
      - Company D (Forward Support), 230th Brigade Support Battalion, in Glen Jean
    - 1st Battalion, 201st Field Artillery Regiment, in Fairmont (M109A6 Paladin) (part of 197th Field Artillery Brigade)
      - Headquarters and Headquarters Battery, 1st Battalion, 201st Field Artillery Regiment, in Fairmont
      - Battery A, 1st Battalion, 201st Field Artillery Regiment, in Elkins
      - Battery B, 1st Battalion, 201st Field Artillery Regiment, in Morgantown
      - Battery C, 1st Battalion, 201st Field Artillery Regiment, in Lewisburg
      - 1201st Forward Support Company, at Camp Dawson
  - 111th Engineer Brigade, in Red House
    - Headquarters and Headquarters Company, 111th Engineer Brigade, in Red House
    - 771st Troop Command Battalion, in Gassaway
      - Headquarters and Headquarters Company, 771st Troop Command Battalion, in Gassaway
      - 156th Military Police Detachment (Law Enforcement), in Holden
      - 157th Military Police Company (Combat Support), in Moorefield
      - 753rd Ordnance Company (EOD), at Camp Dawson (part of 501st Ordnance Battalion (EOD))
      - 863rd Military Police Company, in Glen Jean
      - 1935th Support Detachment (Contracting Team), in Buckhannon
      - 3664th Ordnance Company (Support Maintenance), in Eleanor
    - 772nd Aviation Troop Command Battalion, at Mid-Ohio Valley Airport
      - Headquarters and Headquarters Company, 772nd Aviation Troop Command Battalion, at Mid-Ohio Valley Airport
      - Company C (MEDEVAC), 2nd Battalion (General Support Aviation), 104th Aviation Regiment, at Mid-Ohio Valley Airport (HH-60L Black Hawk)
        - Detachment 3, Headquarters and Headquarters Company, 2nd Battalion (General Support Aviation), 104th Aviation Regiment, at Mid-Ohio Valley Airport
        - Detachment 3, Company D (Aviation Unit Maintenance), 2nd Battalion (General Support Aviation), 104th Aviation Regiment, at Mid-Ohio Valley Airport
        - Detachment 3, Company E (Forward Support), 2nd Battalion (General Support Aviation), 104th Aviation Regiment, at Mid-Ohio Valley Airport
      - Company C, 1st Battalion (Assault), 150th Aviation Regiment, at Wheeling Ohio County Airport (UH-60M Black Hawk)
        - Detachment 1, Headquarters and Headquarters Company, 1st Battalion (Assault), 150th Aviation Regiment, at Wheeling Ohio County Airport
        - Detachment 1, Company D (Aviation Unit Maintenance), 1st Battalion (Assault), 150th Aviation Regiment, at Wheeling Ohio County Airport
        - Detachment 1, Company E (Forward Support), 1st Battalion (Assault), 150th Aviation Regiment, at Wheeling Ohio County Airport
      - Company B, 1st Battalion (Security & Support), 224th Aviation Regiment, at Mid-Ohio Valley Airport (UH-72A Lakota)
      - Detachment 28, Operational Support Airlift Activity, at Mid-Ohio Valley Airport (C-12 Huron)
      - Detachment 5, Company B (Aviation Intermediate Maintenance), 248th Aviation Support Battalion, at Wheeling Ohio County Airport
    - 1092nd Engineer Battalion, in Parkersburg
      - Headquarters and Headquarters Company, 1092nd Engineer Battalion, in Parkersburg
      - Forward Support Company, 1092nd Engineer Battalion, in Parkersburg
      - 115th Engineer Company (Vertical Construction Company), in Clarksburg
        - Detachment 1, 115th Engineer Company (Vertical Construction Company), at Camp Dawson
      - 119th Engineer Company (Sapper), in Moundsville
      - 601st Engineer Company (Engineer Support Company), in Buckhannon
      - 821st Engineer Company (Engineer Construction Company), in Summersville
        - Detachment 1, 821st Engineer Company (Engineer Construction Company), in Parkersburg
      - 922nd Engineer Detachment (Utilities), in Martinsburg
      - 1257th Engineer Detachment (Fire Fighting Team — Fire Truck), at Camp Dawson
      - 1863rd Quartermaster Platoon (Field Feeding), in Buckhannon
  - Army Interagency Training and Education Center, at Camp Dawson
    - Critical Infrastructure Protection Battalion, in St. Albans
    - CBRNE Battalion, in St. Albans and at Camp Dawson
    - 35th Civil Support Team (WMD), in St. Albans
  - 197th Regiment, Regional Training Institute, at Camp Dawson
    - 1st Battalion (Modular Training), at Camp Dawson
    - Fixed Wing Army Aviation Training Site, at North Central West Virginia Airport (C-12 Huron and C-26E Metroliner)

=== Unit details ===
Two units of the West Virginia Army National Guard, the 150th Cavalry Regiment and the 201st Field Artillery Regiment, are among the nineteen Army National Guard units with campaign credit for the War of 1812. The 150th served with the 38th Infantry Division between the wars, served in the Panama Canal Zone during World War II, and was an armored cavalry regiment for a time after World War II.

West Virginia is also home to the 249th Army Band, stationed in Morgantown, WV. The band's history dates back to the turn of the century when it consisted of two bands, the 201st Infantry Band in Morgantown, WV and the 150th Infantry Band in Bluefield, WV. Upon release from federal service in World War Two, these two bands were consolidated into the current 249th and was stationed in Fairmont, West Virginia. In 1995, the 249th was stationed in Morgantown. The band is made up of members from throughout the state as well as surrounding states. These personnel make up a Concert Band, Ceremonial Band, Jazz Ensemble, Rock Band, and several other small ensembles including, but not limited to, a Brass Choir, Jazz Quartet, and Percussion Ensemble.

Located in Preston County, Camp Dawson is the main training site for the units of the West Virginia National Guard. Comprising over 4,000 acres, Camp Dawson has multiple ranges, training sites, and is home to Dawson Army Airfield (K3G5). The West Virginia Guard also hosts the Center for National Response at the Memorial Tunnel in Kanawha County.

It was reported on April 24, 2022, after the beginning of the 2022 Russian invasion of Ukraine, that West Virginia would be sending a number of M113 armored personnel carriers to Ukraine.

== West Virginia Air National Guard ==

The West Virginia Air National Guard is the state's air force militia. It is part of both the United States Air Force and the West Virginia National Guard.

The West Virginia Air National Guard was officially federally recognized on March 7, 1947, as the 167th Fighter Squadron, based at Kanawha Airport in Charleston. During the early years of the 167th, it flew the T-6 Texan trainer, P-51 Mustang and P-47 Thunderbolt. The unit was activated October 10, 1950 during the Korean War, and was designated the 167th Fighter Bomber Squadron when it returned on July 10, 1952. In December 1955, the unit was redesignated as the 167th Fighter Interceptor Squadron, and relocated to Eastern West Virginia Region Airport in Martinsburg, WV.

Today the West Virginia Air National Guard is composed of two airlift units, the 130th Airlift Wing based at Charleston Air National Guard Base in Charleston, West Virginia, and the 167th Airlift Wing based at Shepherd Field Air National Guard Base in Martinsburg, West Virginia. As of 2015, the 167th is flying the C-17 Globemaster III and the 130th is flying the C-130 Hercules in support of operations worldwide. In addition, the 130th and the 167th Wings took part in Operation Desert Shield. Both units report to Air Mobility Command.

=== 130th Airlift Wing ===

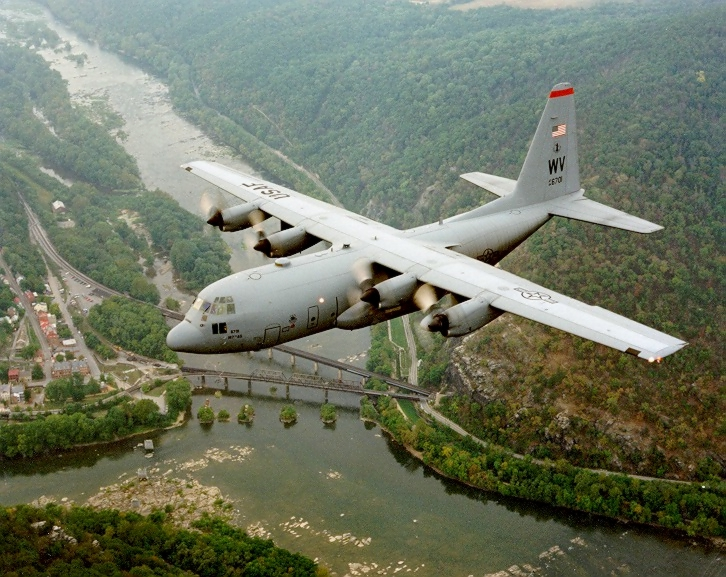
A C-130H of the West Virginia Air National Guard flying over Harpers Ferry, 2006

On 13 May 2005, the Department of Defense released its Base Realignment and Closure, 2005 (BRAC) report, and the 130th Airlift Wing was one of the units slated to be eventually decommissioned. Its complement of eight C-130H aircraft would be realigned to Pope Air Force Base, and its complement of expeditionary combat support (ECS) personnel to the 167th Airlift Wing.

Upon learning of this, several former commanders of the 130th Airlift Wing along with members of the local Kanawha County Commission and the Yeager Airport Board of Directors formed the Keep 'Em Flying grassroots organization to try to prevent the unit from being decommissioned. Following an outpouring of community support, money was raised for newspaper ads and radio ads, and to hire analysts familiar with BRAC, all in an attempt to save the unit. On June 13, 2005, members of the BRAC commission came to Charleston to evaluate the base and talk to General Tackett, Governor Joe Manchin, Senator Robert Byrd, Congresswoman Shelley Moore Capito and Col. Bill Peters, Jr., former commander of the 130th and chair for Keep 'Em Flying.

Following this visit, and taking in all the information that was presented to them during that time, the BRAC commission voted unanimously, 9–0, to keep the unit intact.

=== 167th Airlift Wing ===
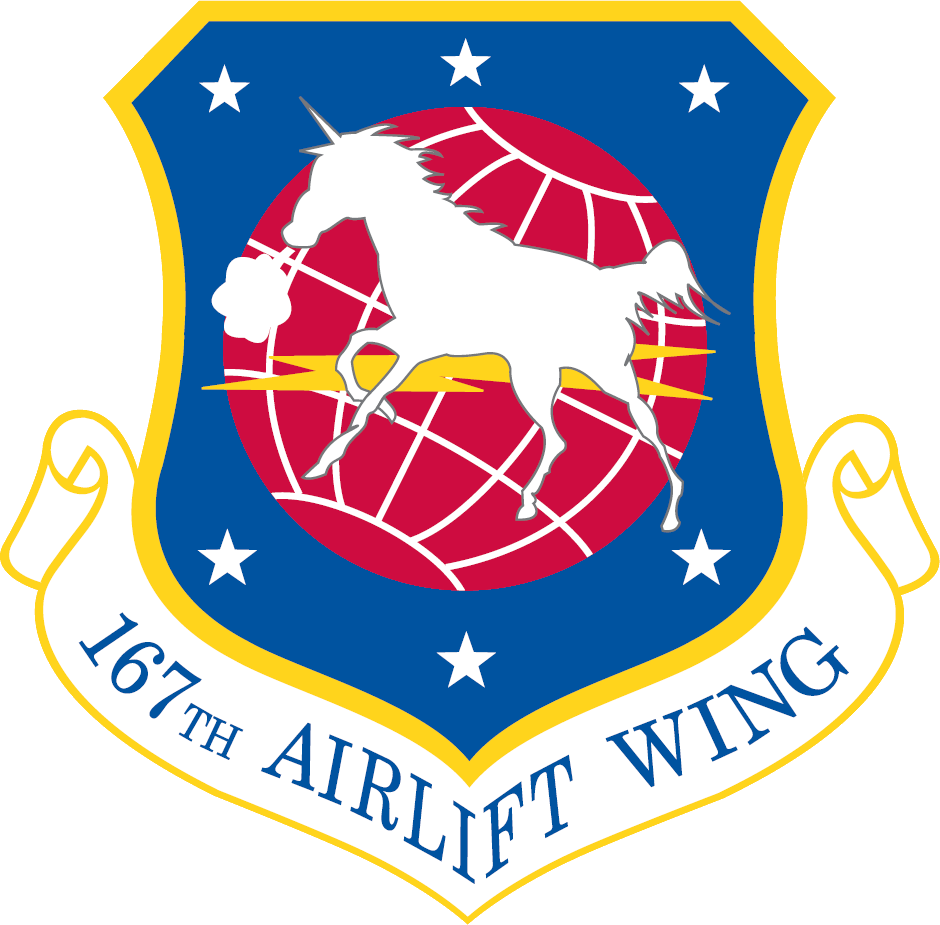

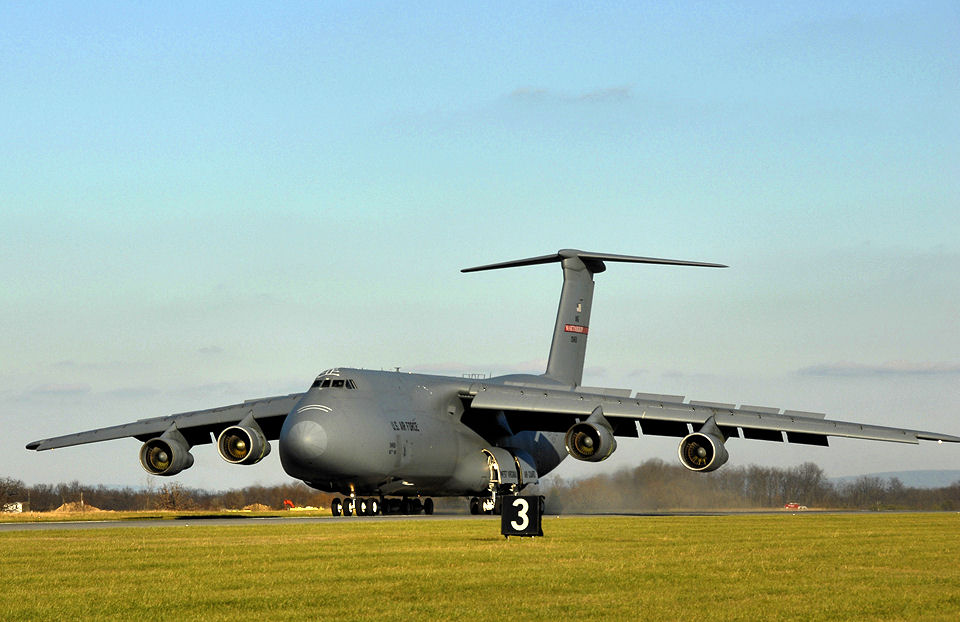
A C-5 Galaxy of the 167th Airlift Wing

Since the September 11 attacks on New York City and Washington, D.C., the unit has had members deployed to the Afghan and Iraq wars. Unit members have received six Bronze Stars and two Purple Hearts in support of these operations. In December 2006, the 167th received its first C-5 Galaxy, out of a total of 11 aircraft. In February 2012, the Force Structure Overview was released by the Secretary of the Air Force. The document detailed numerous aircraft changes throughout the active, Guard and Reserve forces, including the replacement of the unit's C-5 aircraft with C-17s. On September 25, 2014, the 167th Airlift Wing flew its final C-5 mission, a local training sortie. That same day the wing received its first C-17 Globemaster III aircraft, one of eight C-17s the unit is slated to receive.

== In popular culture ==
- The 2020 military fiction novel, Assault by Fire, by H. Ripley Rawlings, prominently features the West Virginia National Guard holding back a Russian attack on the U.S.
