= Memorial Tunnel =

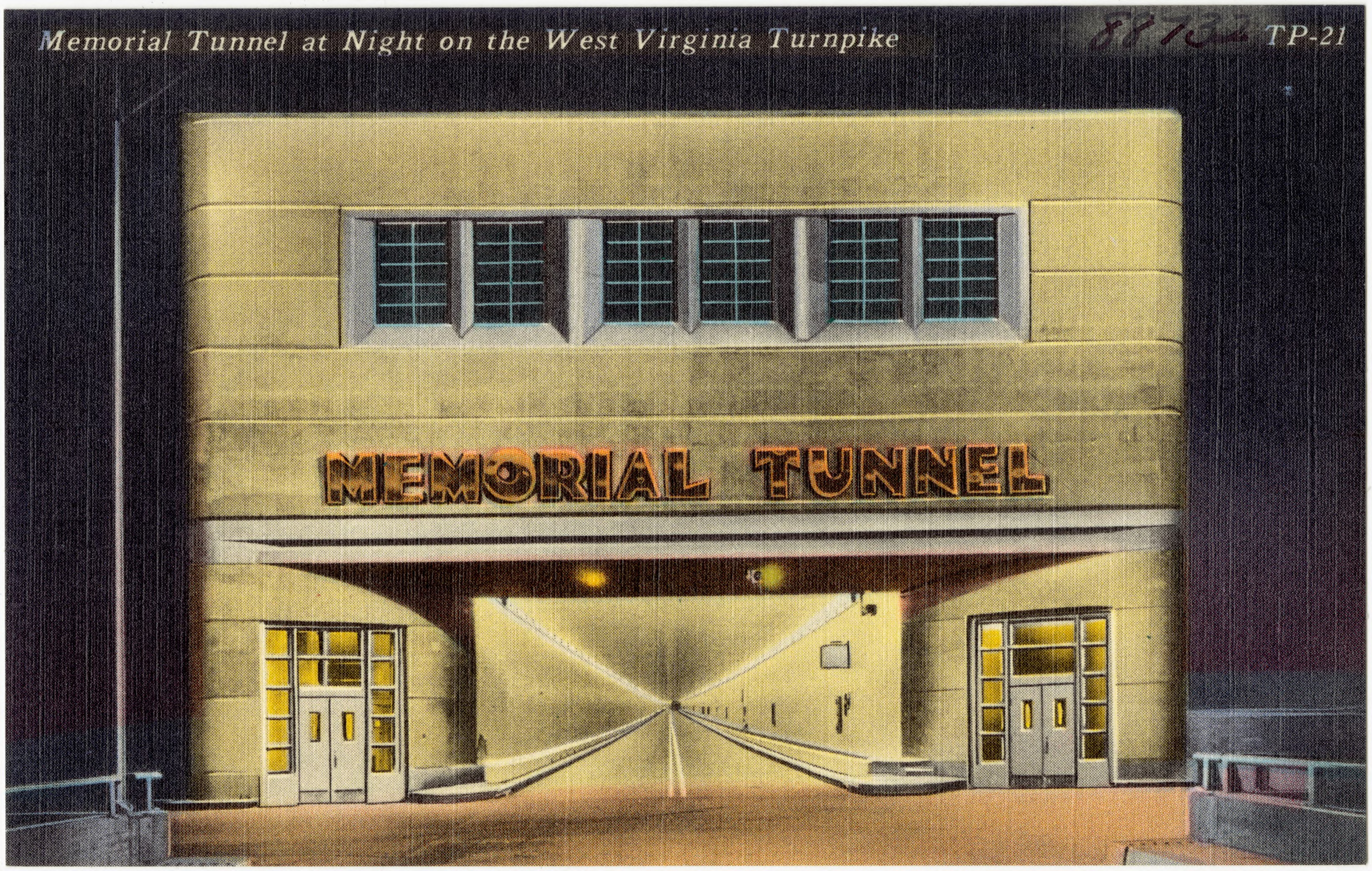
- Interactive map of Memorial Tunnel

Overview
- Location: Standard, West Virginia, United States
- Coordinates: 38.132852°N 81.414957°W
- Status: Closed

Operation
- Work began: 1952
- Opened: November 8, 1954; 71 years ago
- Closed: July 7, 1987; 39 years ago
- Owner: State of West Virginia
- Operator: WV Parkways Authority

Technical
- Length: 2,802 feet (854 m)

The Memorial Tunnel is a 2,802 feet (854 m) two-lane vehicular tunnel that formerly carried the West Virginia Turnpike through/under Paint Creek Mountain in Standard, West Virginia in Kanawha County. Closed to interstate traffic since 1987, the tunnel served as the Center for National Response for military first responders to train for various situations that may arise in such a location without alarming the general public. In 2020, the Center for National Response ceased operations at the tunnel. In February 2022, an agreement was made between the West Virginia Adjutant General's office and a local farmer to utilize the facility to grow mushrooms.

== History ==
Construction of the Memorial Tunnel began in 1952. It opened to traffic on November 8, 1954, at a final cost of $5 million. Its construction required moving 91,000 cubic yards (70,000 m^{3}) of earth, and it was the first tunnel in the nation to have closed-circuit television monitoring. At the time, the West Virginia Turnpike was referred to as "88 miles of miracle".

=== Turnpike widening ===
From 1976 to 1983, the increasingly heavily traveled Turnpike was widened from two lanes to four over its entire length with the exception of the Memorial Tunnel. This caused bottlenecks where the newly widened divided highway transitioned to the two-lane, two-way tunnel, which also had a lower speed limit. Congestion was especially pronounced during periods with increased traffic, such as holiday seasons.

=== Tunnel bypass ===
Instead of upgrading and widening the tunnel, it was bypassed on a new 1.72-mile (2.77 km) alignment that also bypassed Bender Bridge over Paint Creek. As part of the $35 million bypass project, 10 million cubic yards (7,600,000 m^{3}) of earth and 300,000 tons of coal were removed from the mountain. The last vehicle passed through the tunnel on July 7, 1987, after which it was closed to traffic.

=== Alternate use ===
Between 1992 and 1995, the Department of Transportation entered a deal with the state to utilize the abandoned tunnel for smoke, fire and ventilation experiments. These experiments were carried out to design better developed ventilation systems for the tunnels being constructed as part of the Big Dig in Boston; the results of the tests were also incorporated into the design of the Channel Tunnel. These experiments also resulted in the Federal Highway Administration allowing jet fans for ventilation in tunnel construction, which was a significant change to their original ventilation designs. The lasting legacy of the Memorial Tunnel Fire Test Program is in both changes in ceilings materials used in tunnel construction as well in the approved use of jet fans for ventilation during construction.

By 2000, the tunnel had been selected as the location where the Center for National Response would conduct anti-terrorism training exercises. The facilities offered in the center included:

- A rubble area to simulate collapsed buildings
- An emergency egress trainer
- A subway station, complete with 800 feet (240 m) of track and two subway cars from Boston's Green Line
- A drug enforcement section
- A highway tunnel section, complete with a New York City Transit Authority bus, firetrucks, a tractor-trailer and other vehicles
- A 50-car pileup wreck complete with hazardous materials

Groups from around the country sent personnel to West Virginia to train in the facility. In all, about 160,000 first responders have been trained by West Virginians.

After 20 years of operating as the Center for National Response, the West Virginia National Guard announced in February, 2022 that the tunnel would be converted to a mushroom farm operated by Hernshaw Farms.

== See also ==
- West Virginia Turnpike
- Interstate 64 in West Virginia
- Interstate 77 in West Virginia
- Abandoned Pennsylvania Turnpike
- Laurel Hill Tunnel
- Rays Hill Tunnel
- Sideling Hill Tunnel
