= Center for National Response =

Coordinates: 38.132852°N 81.414957°W

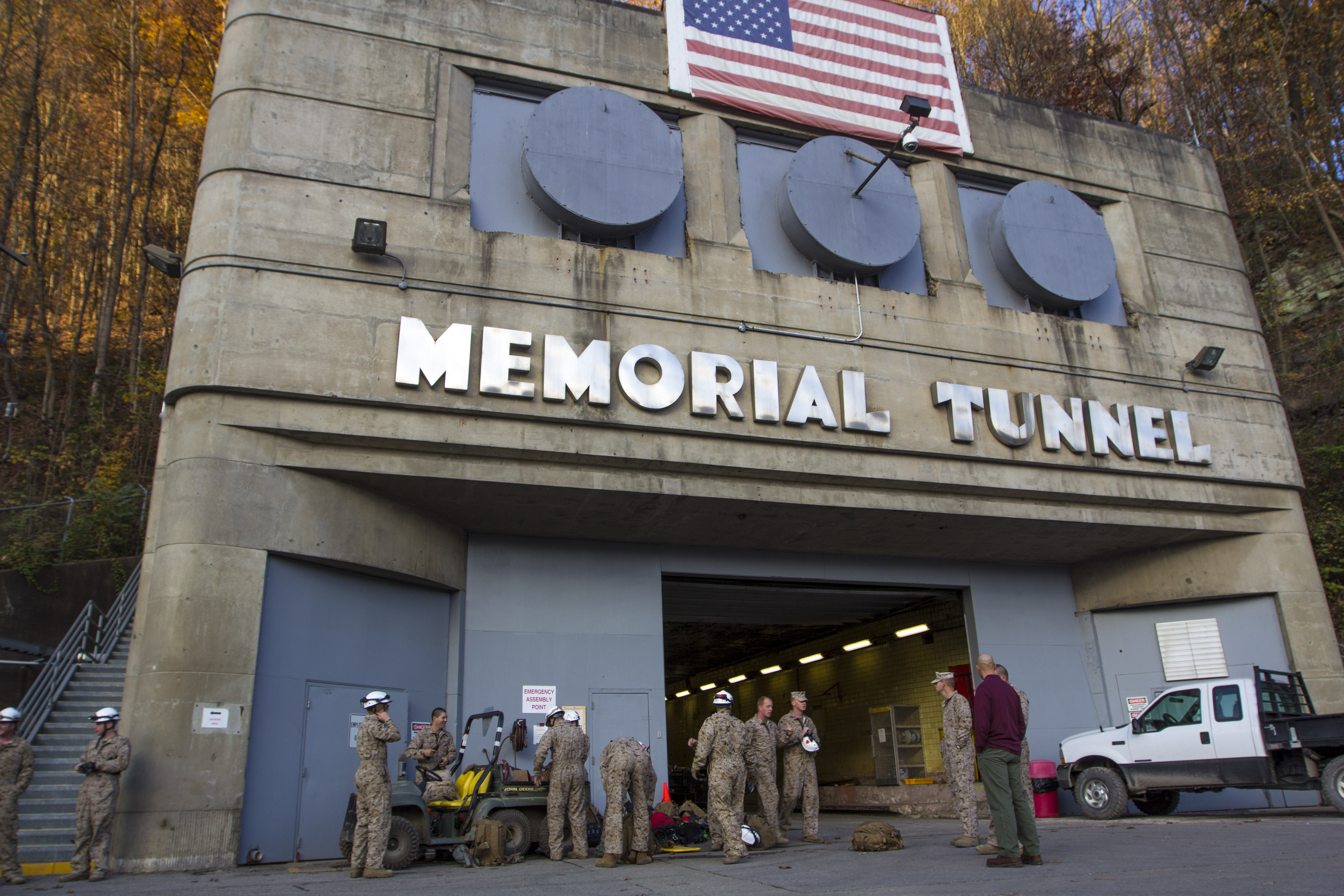
CBRN Training at CNR.

The Center for National Response was formerly located inside a former 2,802 feet (854 m) two-lane vehicular tunnel opened November 8, 1954 as part of the West Virginia Turnpike. Originally known as Memorial Tunnel, the tunnel formerly carried West Virginia Turnpike through/under Paint Creek Mountain in Standard, West Virginia in Kanawha County. Its construction required the movement of 91,000 cubic yards (70,000 m^{3}) of earth, and was the first tunnel in the nation to have closed-circuit television monitoring. at a final cost of $5 million. The facility was last administered by the West Virginia National Guard.

During the 1980s, an upgrade of the Turnpike included a 1.72 mile (2.77 km) bypass of the tunnel and the adjacent Stanley Bender Bridge across Paint Creek. [2] Costing $35 million to complete, 10,000,000 cubic yards (7,600,000 m3) of earth were removed in addition to 300,000 tons of coal being removed from the mountain.[2] The final vehicle would pass through the tunnel on July 7, 1987, and it would subsequently close for use for vehicular through traffic.[3]

Closed to interstate traffic since 1987, since being bypassed, the tunnel has become an unusual testing and training facility. The former Turnpike tunnel was first used by state agencies and later converted to serve as a location for first responders local fire and rescue departments, law enforcement organizations, and various federal agencies including military to train for various situations that may arise in such a location without alarming the general public.

Between 1992 and 1995, the Department of Transportation entered a deal with the state to utilize the abandoned tunnel for smoke, fire and ventilation experiments. These experiments were carried out to design better developed ventilation systems for the tunnels being constructed as part of the Big Dig in Boston (the results of the tests were also incorporated into the design of the Channel Tunnel). These experiments also resulted in the Federal Highway Administration allowing jet fans for ventilation in tunnel construction, which was a significant change to their original ventilation designs. The lasting legacy of the Memorial Tunnel Fire Test Program is in both changes in ceilings materials used in tunnel construction as well in the approved use of jet fans for ventilation during construction.

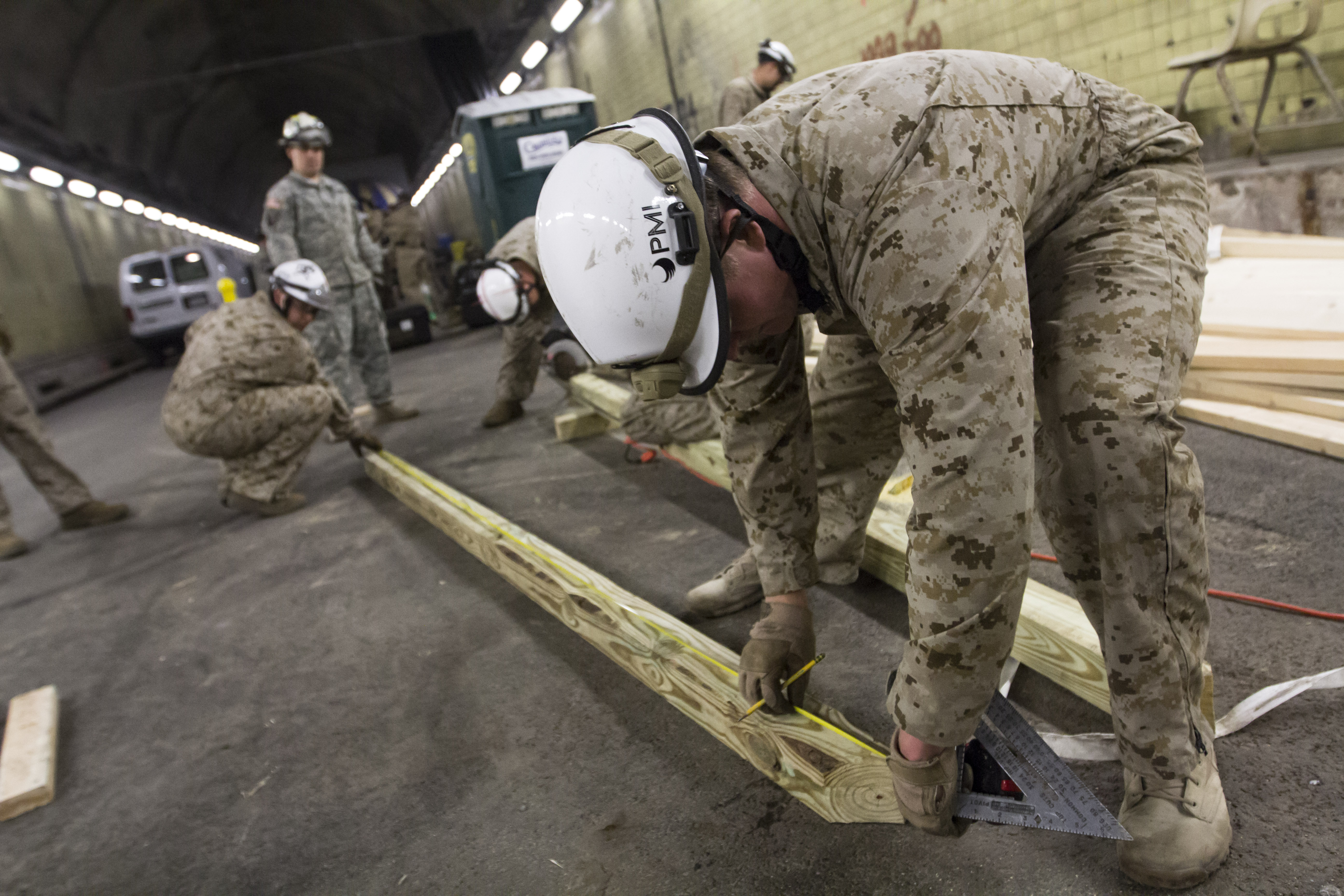

By 2000, the tunnel had been selected as the location where the Center for National Response would conduct anti-terrorism training exercises. The current facilities offered in the center include:

- A rubble area to simulate collapsed buildings
- An emergency egress trainer
- A subway station, complete with 800 feet (240 m) of track and two subway cars from Boston's Green Line
- A drug enforcement section
- A highway tunnel section, complete with a New York City Transit Authority bus, firetrucks, a tractor-trailer and other vehicles

The tunnel's bypass is not unlike the Pennsylvania Turnpike bypassing the Laurel Hill Tunnel in 1964, followed by the bypass of the Rays Hill and Sideling Hill Tunnels in 1968.

In February, 2022, the West Virginia National Guard announced that it was in the process of ending Center for National Response operations and vacating the tunnel. A local mushroom growing company subsequently took ownership of the tunnel and is using the tunnel to cultivate mushrooms.

== See also ==
- Memorial Tunnel
- West Virginia Turnpike
- Interstate 64 in West Virginia
- Interstate 77 in West Virginia
- Abandoned Pennsylvania Turnpike
- Laurel Hill Tunnel
