= Diamond, West Virginia =

Diamond, West Virginia may refer to:

- Diamond, Kanawha County, West Virginia, an unincorporated community in Kanawha County
- Diamond, Logan County, West Virginia, an unincorporated community in Logan County
