= Camp Dawson =

Camp Dawson may refer to:

- Camp Dawson (New Jersey)
- Camp Dawson (West Virginia)
