= 201st Field Artillery Regiment =

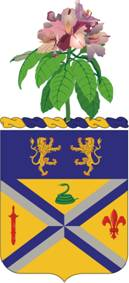
- Coat of arms
- Active: 1735–present
- Country: United States
- Allegiance: West Virginia
- Branch: West Virginia Army National Guard
- Type: Field artillery regiment
- Size: 1 active battalion
- Garrison/HQ: Fairmont, West Virginia
- Nickname: First West Virginia (Special Designation)
- Motto: Yes Sir
- Equipment: M109A6 Paladin, HEMTT, HMMWV
- Engagements: French and Indian War; American Revolutionary War; War of 1812; Mexican–American War; American Civil War; Spanish–American War; World War I World War II; Korean War; Vietnam War; Gulf War; Iraq War; War in Afghanistan: Operation New Dawn

Insignia
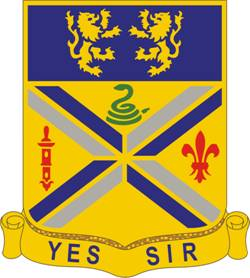
- Distinctive unit insignia

The 201st Field Artillery Regiment ("First West Virginia") is a West Virginia Army National Guard regiment. It currently perpetuates the Virginia elements of the Maryland and Virginia Rifle Regiment, which fought in the American Revolution. Organized by Colonel Morgan Morgan in Bunker Hill, West Virginia in 1735, it is one of the oldest continually-active regiments in the U.S. Army, and the oldest unit in the West Virginia Army National Guard. Units also saw action on both sides of the American Civil War, with many companies of the regiment combined to form the Union Army's 1st West Virginia Infantry.

Headquartered in Fairmont, West Virginia, the 201st Field Artillery employs the M109A6 Paladin self-propelled howitzer, and is part of the 197th Field Artillery Brigade, which is part of the New Hampshire Army National Guard.

== History ==
201st Field Artillery in West Virginia

=== American Revolution ===
What would eventually become the 1st West Virginia was first organized on 17 February 1735 as Captain Morgan Morgan’s Company of Volunteer Militia of Orange County, Virginia. Reorganized and redesignated in November 1738 as Captain Morgan Morgan’s Company, Frederick County Militia. Expanded on 24 February 1742 as Morgan’s Battalion. Captain Robert Rutherford’s Company of Rangers was raised from volunteers of Morgan’s Battalion in early 1758 and served through 1759. Expanded in 1772 as the Berkeley County Regiment of Militia with the creation of Berkeley County. The Berkeley County Regiment was called into active service by elements at various times from 1775–1782, and additionally furnished companies and replacements for various elements of the Virginia Line of the Continental Army. Captain Hugh Stephenson’s Rifle Company was organized from 14 June–17 July 1775 as an independent company in the Continental Army, reorganized and redesignated on 9 July 1776 as Captain Abraham Shepherd’s Company of the Maryland and Virginia Rifle Regiment, Colonel Hugh Stephenson commanding; the Maryland and Virginia Rifle Regiment was constituted on 27 June 1776 and organized in the summer of 1776 from new and existing rifle companies from Maryland and Virginia, and was captured on 16 November 1776 at Fort Washington, New York, being exchanged November 1780 and disbanded on 1 January 1781. The Virginia elements of the Maryland and Virginia Rifle Regiment were consolidated after 16 November 1776 as Captain Gabriel Long’s Detachment and transferred on 12 February 1777 to the 11th Virginia Regiment, Colonel Daniel Morgan commanding, and were disbanded in May 1778 with personnel transferred to other elements of the 11th (later 7th) Virginia Regiment. Reorganized on 22 December 1792 as volunteer companies of the 10th and 16th Brigades, Virginia Militia, embracing what is now northern West Virginia; 18th and 20th Brigades subsequently organized. Volunteer companies of the 10th and 16th Brigades were mustered into active service from September-December 1794. Captain Cornelius Bogard’s Company of Volunteer Rangers of Monongalia County was in state service in 1794.

=== War of 1812 and Mexican-American War ===
Captain James Faulkner’s Company of Berkeley Artillery was organized in 1808 at Martinsburg. Volunteer companies of the 10th, 16th, 18th, and 20th Brigades were consolidated in September 1812 with five companies from what is now southern West Virginia to form the 2nd Regiment, Virginia Volunteer Militia; mustered out in April 1813. The Berkeley Blues were mustered into federal service on 21 January 1847 at Richmond as Company H, 1st Virginia Volunteer Infantry Regiment, and mustered out of federal service on 31 July 1848 at Fort Monroe, Virginia.

=== American Civil War ===
Elements with Union sympathies were reorganized in May 1861 at Wheeling and mustered into federal service as the 1st Virginia Volunteer Infantry Regiment, a three-month unit. The regiment was mustered out of federal service on 27 August 1861, reorganized, and mustered back into federal service on 30 October 1861 at Wheeling. It was consolidated on 10 December 1864 with the 4th Virginia Volunteer Infantry Regiment (organized June-August 1861 at Grafton and Point Pleasant) to form the 2nd West Virginia Veteran Volunteer Infantry Regiment, and was mustered out of federal service on 16 July 1865.

Elements with Confederate sympathies joined various Virginia regiments of the Confederate States Army, including the Berkeley Blues, which were mustered into Confederate service on 19 April 1861 and reorganized as Company B (Arbutus-Wise Artillery), 1st Virginia Light Artillery Regiment; reorganized and redesignated 26 April 1862 as Captain James S. Brown’s Independent Battery (Wise Artillery); disbanded 4 October 1862.

The northwestern portion of Virginia entered the Union on 20 June 1863 as the state of West Virginia. State forces in northern West Virginia were reorganized on 21 November 1863 as volunteer companies in the 1st Division, West Virginia Militia. Reorganized in 1878 as the 1st Regiment, West Virginia Volunteer Militia. The West Virginia Militia was redesignated in 1889 as the West Virginia National Guard.

=== Spanish-American War ===
The 1st and 2nd Regiments were consolidated on 29 April 1898 to form the 1st West Virginia Volunteer Infantry, which was mustered into federal service from 7–14 May 1898 at Charleston and mustered out of federal service 4 February 1899 at Columbus, Georgia. The former 1st Regiment was reorganized in 1899.

=== World War I ===
During World War I, the 1st West Virginia Infantry Regiment was broken up and assigned to various units of the 38th Division; the Supply Company became part of the 113th Engineer Train, the Machine Gun Company and 1st Battalion part of the 137th Machine Gun Battalion, Companies E and F part of the 113th Engineer Regiment, and Companies G and H became part of the 113th Ammunition Train. The 3rd Battalion and Headquarters Company (less Band) became part of the 150th Infantry Regiment along with the entire 2nd West Virginia Infantry Regiment.

=== Interwar period ===
What would become the 201st Infantry was demobilized from January–June 1919 as the various elements of the 38th Division noted above. The 1st West Virginia Infantry was rerganized from 1924–27, and was redesignated the 201st Infantry on 11 May 1926. The regimental headquarters was organized on 17 December 1927 and federally recognized at Fairmont, West Virginia. The headquarters was relocated on 5 June 1930 to Morgantown, West Virginia. The regiment was assigned to the Second Army on 1 October 1933. The regiment, or elements thereof, were called up to perform the following state duties: 1st Battalion called up to perform martial law in connection with a mine explosion at Everettville, West Virginia, 1–5 May 1927; Headquarters Company to perform firefighting duties at Terra Alta, West Virginia, 9–10 February 1934. The regiment conducted annual summer training most years at Camp Dawson, West Virginia, and some years at Camp William G. Conley, West Virginia, from 1921–40. For at least three years (1931–33) the regiment also trained some 26 company-grade Organized Reserve infantry officers of the 100th Division at Camp Dawson. The regiment was relieved from assignment to, and attached to, the Second Army on 30 December 1940.

=== World War II ===
On 6 January 1941 the 201st was inducted into federal service at home stations, and moved to Fort Benjamin Harrison, Indiana, on 10 January 1941 where it was attached to the Second Army. The regiment staged at Camp Murray, Washington, on 5 August 1941 until it departed the Seattle port of embarkation on 12 September 1941, arriving at Kodiak, Alaska, on 16 September 1941. The 201st transferred to Adak Island in November 1942 and to Amchitka in January 1943 before departing Alaska on 22 March 1944 and returning to Seattle on 2 April 1944. The regiment moved to Camp Carson, Colorado, on 10 April 1944 under the XVI Corps, and was reassigned to the XXXVI Corps on 17 July 1944. Beginning in April 1944, the regiment provided an accelerated six-week course of infantry training (four weeks of familiarization, qualification, and transition firing, and two weeks of tactical training) to men who were formerly members of disbanded anti-aircraft and tank destroyer units or who had volunteered for transfer to the infantry from other branches of the Army. It relocated to Fort Jackson, South Carolina, on 10 September 1944 under IX Corps and was assigned to XXIII Corps on 25 September 1944. It arrived at Camp Rucker, Alabama, on 3 March 1945 under the Replacement & School Command and was inactivated there on 26 September 1945.

Following the war’s end the 201st reverted to state control where it was reorganized and redesignated as the 201st Field Artillery Battalion.

=== Gulf War ===
In December 1990, the unit was called to serve in Operation Desert Storm. The unit was activated for 180 days unless sooner released or later extended. The 201st left Fairmont and went to Fort Campbell, Kentucky for training. It joined XVIII Corps Artillery, 18th Field Artillery Brigade. On the exact 256th anniversary of its founding, the unit fired 256 rounds downrange at Iraqi forces. David Tucker was a chaplain's assistant of the unit at the time and noted this in a letter to The Fairmont Times.

The units of the 201st returned to their home base in May, 1991. The "First West Virginia" did not lose a single soldier during the war.

=== Iraq War ===
In December 2003, the 201st was again called to active duty for Operation Iraqi Freedom. The soldiers trained at Fort Drum, New York in January and February, 2004 before going overseas. While in theater, the battalion was subordinated to the 197th Fires Brigade of the New Hampshire National Guard and commanded by Colonel James Guise. The 197th reported directly to III Corps Artillery, under the command of Brigadier General Richard Formica. The unit spent one year in Iraq before returning home in February 2005. The Battalion Headquarters (HHB) operated out of Camp Cedar II and Tallil Airbase, both of which are approximately 10 miles (16 km) west of An Nasiriyah in the Dhi Qar province of Iraq. B Battery and Service Battery were co-located with the HHB. A Battery operated out of Convoy Support Center (CSC) Scania and C Battery operated out of CSC Navistar in Kuwait. The Battalion's mission was convoy security and route clearance for Main Supply Route (MSR) Tampa, the primary route for supplies in Iraq at the time. C Battery would later move north to Camp Cedar II and Tallil Airbase and continue convoy security. Some members of C Battery were also attached to the 1st Cav Division in Jan 2005 to provide extra security in Baghdad (they were stationed in the Hotel District: the Baghdad, Palestine and Sheraton Hotels across the river from the Green Zone) for the first elections while the rest of the unit and battalion trained their replacements.

== Current organization ==
Today, 1st Battalion, 201st Field Artillery Regiment is the only active squadron in the regiment. Battery A, B, and C each field the M109A6 Paladin, a self-propelled howitzer utilizing a 155mm main cannon. The "First West Virginia" is also complemented by two detachments from the 1201st Forward Support Company, which are attached to the regiment.

- Headquarters 1-201st Field Artillery: Fairmont, West Virginia
- A Battery: Belington, West Virginia
- B Battery: Morgantown, West Virginia
- C Battery: Maxwelton, West Virginia
- Detachment 3, 1201st Forward Support Company: Morgantown, West Virginia
- Detachment 5, 1201st Forward Support Company: Maxwelton, West Virginia

== Honors and awards ==
=== Honors ===
- Meritorious Unit Commendation (Army), Streamer embroidered SOUTHWEST ASIA (1st Battalion, 201st Field Artillery, cited; Department of the Army General Orders No. 25, 2001)

=== Campaign participation credit ===
Revolutionary War

- Boston
- New York 1776

War of 1812

- Indiana Territory 1812-1813

Civil War - Union service

- Valley
- Manassas
- Vicksburg
- Chattanooga
- Shenandoah
- Virginia 1861, 1862, 1863

Civil War - Confederate service

- First Manassas
- Peninsula
- Second Manassas
- Sharpsburg

World War I

- Streamer without inscription

World War II

- Aleutian Islands

Southwest Asia

- Liberation and Defense of Kuwait
- Cease-Fire

== Heraldry ==
=== Distinctive unit insignia ===
- Description: A Gold colored metal and enamel device 1 inch (2.54 cm) in height consisting of a shield blazoned: Or, a saltire per saltire Azure and Gray per cross counterchanged between in chief a rattlesnake coiled to strike Vert and in fess a sheathed Roman sword and a fleur-de-lis Gules, on a chief Azure two lions combatant of the first. Attached below the shield is a Gold scroll inscribed "YES SIR" in Blue letters.
- Symbolism: The chief is blue for Infantry. The two lions represent the Revolutionary War and the War of 1812. The saltire counterchanged denotes Civil War service in both the Union and Confederate armies. The snake alludes to Mexican–American War service. The Roman sword is indicative of Spanish War service and the fleur-de-lis refers to service in France during World War I.
- Background: The distinctive unit insignia was originally approved for the 201st Infantry Regiment on 20 November 1929. It was redesignated for the 201st Armored Field Artillery Battalion on 20 July 1953. It was redesignated for the 201st Artillery Regiment on 18 July 1960. The insignia was redesignated for the 201st Field Artillery Regiment on 19 July 1972.

=== Coat of arms ===
Blazon:

- Shield: Or, a saltire per saltire Azure and Gray per cross counterchanged between in chief a rattlesnake coiled to strike Vert and in fess a sheathed Roman sword and a fleur-de-lis Gules, on a chief Azure two lions combatant of the first.
- Crest: That for the regiments and separate battalions of the West Virginia Army National Guard: On a wreath of the colors Or and Azure, a slip of mountain rhododendron in full bloom and leaved Proper.
- Motto: YES SIR.

Symbolism:

- Shield: The chief is blue for Infantry. The two lions represent the Revolutionary War and the War of 1812. The saltire counterchanged denotes Civil War service in both the Confederate and Federal armies. The snake alludes to Mexican–American War service. The Roman sword is indicative of Spanish War service and the fleur-de-lis refers to service in France during World War I.
- Crest: The crest is that of the West Virginia Army National Guard.

Background: The coat of arms was originally approved for the 201st Infantry Regiment on 21 November 1929. It was redesignated for the 201st Armored Field Artillery Battalion on 20 July 1953. It was redesignated for the 201st Artillery Regiment on 18 July 1960. The insignia was redesignated for the 201st Field Artillery Regiment on 19 July 1972.
