= Beckley Airport =

Beckley Airport may refer to:

- Beckley Raleigh County Memorial Airport
- Springfield-Beckley Municipal Airport
