= Sycamore, Logan County, West Virginia =

Sycamore, West Virginia
- Unincorporated community
- Location within West Virginia Location within the United States
- Coordinates: 37°49′40″N 82°4′16″W
- Country: United States
- State: West Virginia
- County: Logan
- Elevation: 846 ft (258 m)
- Time zone: UTC-5 (Eastern (EST))
  - Summer (DST): UTC-4 (EDT)
- GNIS ID: 1555773

Sycamore is an unincorporated community in Logan County, West Virginia, United States. It is part of the Holden census-designated place.
