= 57th Troop Command =

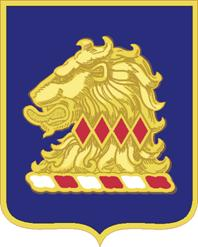
- 57th Troop Command SSI
- Country: United States
- Allegiance: New Jersey
- Branch: Army National Guard
- Garrison/HQ: Atlantic City

Commanders
- Current commander: COL Erik K. Rautenberg
- Command Sergeant Major: CSM Dean C. Hughes

Insignia
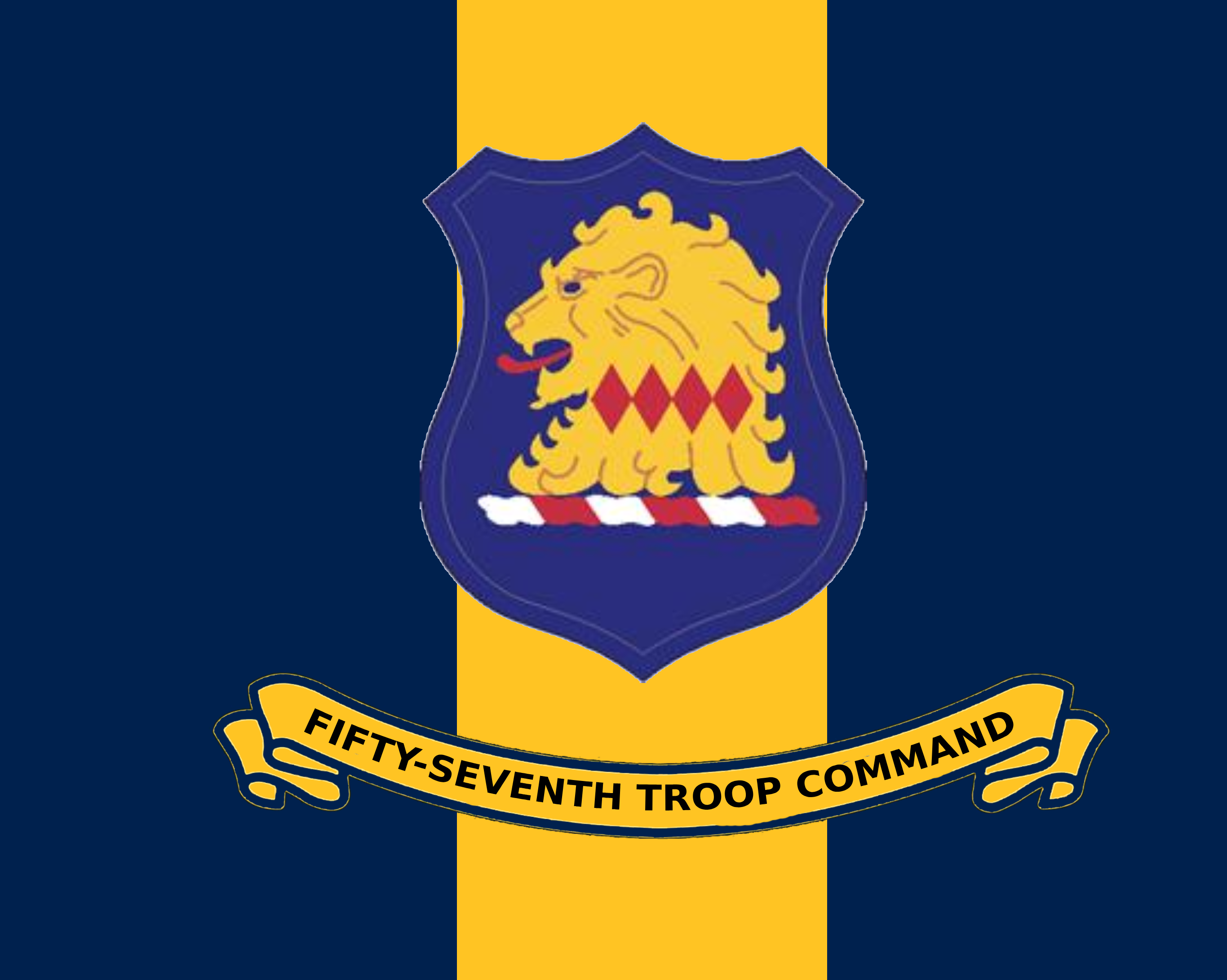
- New Jersey Army National Guard 57th Troop Command Flag

The 57th Troop Command is a brigade level administrative formation of the New Jersey Army National Guard supervising independent battalions or battalions affiliated with out-of-state higher headquarters.

== Subordinate Units ==
- 21st Civil Support Team, Fort Dix
- 831st Judge Advocate General Detachment, Fort Belvoir, VA
- 63rd Army Band, Sea Grit, NJ
- 1st Battalion (Assault Helicopter), 150th Aviation Regiment, Lakehurst, NJ
- 444th Mobile Public Affairs Detachment, Lawrenceville, NJ
- Cyber Protection Team 173, Detachment 1, Sea Grit, NJ
