= 150th Aviation Regiment (United States) =

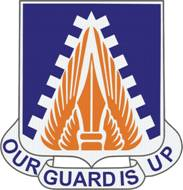
- 150th Aviation Regiment distinctive unit insignia
- Country: United States
- Branch: United States Army Aviation Branch

Aircraft flown
- Utility helicopter: UH-60M Black Hawk

The 150th Aviation Regiment is a regiment of the United States Army National Guard organized under the United States Army Regimental System. It was constituted 1 October 1987 in the New Jersey, Vermont and Delaware Army National Guard as the 150th Aviation, a parent regiment under the United States Army Regimental System. It was organized to consist of 1st Battalion at Trenton Airport, New Jersey, Company D at Burlington Airport, Vermont; Company E at New Castle Air National Guard Base, Delaware and Company F at Dover, New Jersey, all elements of the 50th Armored Division.

== 1st Battalion ==
History

The 1st Battalion (Assault), 150th Aviation Regiment was split between two mid-Atlantic states with a total of 16 UH-60 Black Hawk helicopters. One half of the unit was the Headquarters & Headquarters Company (HHC), Company A, and Company C based at Trenton, New Jersey on the Trenton-Mercer Airport. The other half was Company B with an HHC detachment and a Company C detachment based at the New Castle County Airport in Delaware. The 1st Battalion, 150th Aviation Regiment was mobilized in May 2004 in support for Operation Iraqi Freedom and deployed to Iraq in November 2004. The soldiers of the 1–150th served with distinction during the 12-month deployment supporting the 42nd Infantry Division Command Group Mission throughout their sector by executing command & control, air assault, and air movement missions. After their combat tour, they arrived back on US soil in November 2005.

In 2009 the units were again deployed to Iraq. The 628th went to Tallil and the 1-150th was in Al Kut. During this deployment the 1-150th Aviation fell under the Combat Aviation Brigade, 28th Infantry Division and later the 12th Combat Aviation Brigade. They suffered no casualties during the 9–10 months in country.

Current Structure

The battalion is based at Joint Base McGuire-Dix-Lakehurst, Lakehurst, New Jersey.

- Headquarters and Headquarters Company
  - Detachment 2 (WV ARNG)
- Company A
- Company B
- Company C (UH-60L) at Army Aviation Support Facility No. 2, Wheeling Ohio County Airport (WV ARNG)
- Company D (AVUM level maintenance)
  - Detachment 2 (WV ARNG)
- Company E (Ground Support)
  - Detachment 2 (WV ARNG)
- Detachment 1, Bravo Company, 628th Aviation Support Battalion (Aviation Intermediate Maintenance (AVIM))

The 150th falls under the 57th Troop Command, New Jersey Army National Guard, who are based out of Atlantic City, NJ.
