= Raleigh County Memorial Airport =

Airport in West Virginia

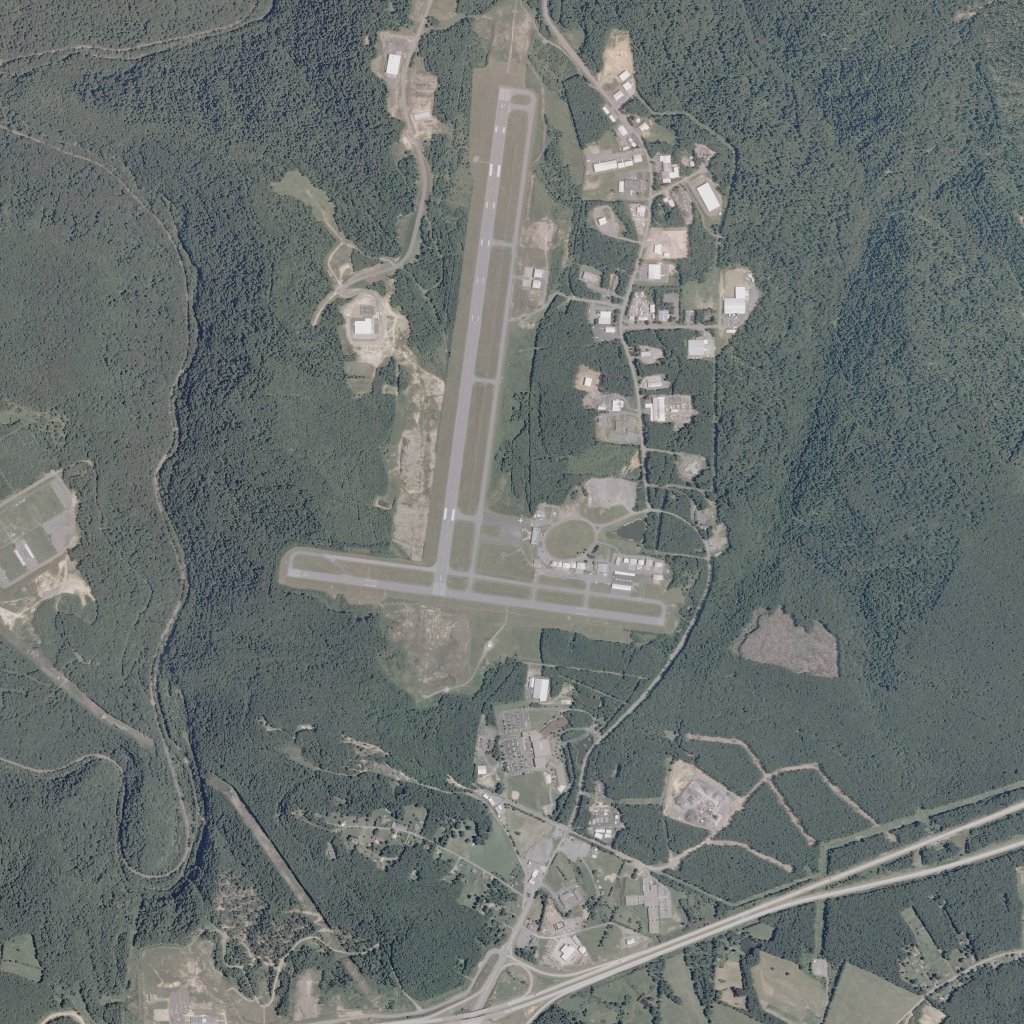
- USGS orthophoto of Raleigh County Memorial Airport
- IATA: BKW; ICAO: KBKW; FAA LID: BKW

Summary
- Airport type: Public
- Owner: Raleigh County Airport Authority
- Serves: Raleigh County, West Virginia
- Location: 176 Airport Road, Beaver, West Virginia, United States
- Elevation AMSL: 2,504 ft (763 m)
- Coordinates: 37°47′14″N 081°07′27″W
- Website: www.FlyBeckley.com

Maps
- Location within West Virginia Location within the United States
- Interactive map of Raleigh County Memorial Airport

Runways
Direction	Length		Surface
Direction	ft	m	Surface
1/19	6,750	2,057	Asphalt
10/28	5,001	1,524	Asphalt

Statistics (2022)
- Aircraft operations (year ending 4/30/2022): 23,181
- Based aircraft: 33
- Sources: Airport and FAA

Raleigh County Memorial Airport (IATA: BKW, ICAO: KBKW, FAA LID: BKW) is approximately three miles (5 km) east of the city of Beckley, in Raleigh County, West Virginia, United States. It is both owned and operated by the Raleigh County Airport Authority. The airport is used for general aviation and sees one scheduled passenger airline, subsidized by the Essential Air Service program.

Federal Aviation Administration records say the airport had 3,630 passenger boardings (enplanements) in calendar year 2008, 2,626 in 2009 and 2,429 in 2010. The National Plan of Integrated Airport Systems for 2011–2015 categorized it as a non-primary commercial service airport based on enplanements in 2008, (between 2,500 and 10,000) but would later categorize it as general aviation based on the number of enplanements in 2010 (under 2,500).

The airport opened in 1950–52 with a 4,200-foot (1,300 m), east-west runway; the first airline flights were Piedmont DC-3s in 1952. (The last Piedmont YS-11 left in 1981.) The runway was extended to 5,000 feet (1,500 m) in the 1950s, and the 6,750-foot (2,060 m) runway 1/19 was constructed between 1975 and 1979.

In 2005, the airport was the least busy airport in the United States that also had an airline service, with a total of 2,578 passengers served during that year.

== Facilities ==
The airport covers 1,433 acres (580 ha) at an elevation of 2,504 feet (763 m). It has two asphalt runways: 1/19 is 6,750 by 150 feet (2,057 x 46 m) and 10/28 is 5,001 by 100 feet (1,524 x 30 m).

In the year ending April 30, 2022, the airport had 23,181 aircraft operations, which was an average of 63 per day: 85% general aviation, 6% air taxi, and 9% military. 33 aircraft were then based at the airport: 21 single-engine, 7 multi-engine, 4 jet, and 1 helicopter.

== Airline and destinations ==
=== Passenger ===
Airlines	Destinations	Refs.
Contour Airlines	Charlotte, Parkersburg; Seasonal: Myrtle Beach	

=== Cargo ===
FedEx Feeder is operated at the field by Mountain Air Cargo. UPS feeder flights are operated by Air Cargo Carriers.

Airline	Destinations	Refs.
Air Cargo Carriers	Charleston (WV), Louisville	
FedEx Feeder	Huntington (WV)	

== Statistics ==
Busiest domestic routes from Raleigh County Airport (BKW) (July 2024 – June 2025)
Rank	City	Passengers
1	Charlotte, North Carolina	5,580
2	Parkersburg, West Virginia	540

== See also ==
- List of airports in West Virginia

== Other sources ==
- Essential Air Service documents (Docket DOT-OST-1997-2761) from the U.S. Department of Transportation:
  - Order 2004-6-14 (June 18, 2004): selecting Colgan Air, Inc., d/b/a US Airways Express, to continue providing essential air service at Beckley and Bluefield/Princeton, West Virginia, for the two-year period beginning August 1, 2004, at an annual subsidy of $2,017,064.
  - Order 2006-7-2 (July 3, 2006): selecting Colgan Air, Inc., d/b/a US Airways Express, to provide essential air service at Beckley, West Virginia, for a new two-year period beginning August 1, 2006, at a subsidy of $1,930,759 annually.
  - Order 2008-6-14 (June 10, 2008): re-selecting Pinnacle Airlines, Corp. d/b/a Colgan Air, Inc., to continue to provide subsidized essential air service (EAS) at Beckley, West Virginia, for the two-year period beginning August 1, 2008, at the annual subsidy rate of $2,092,844.
  - Order 2010-6-25 (June 29, 2010): re-selecting Colgan Air, Inc. to provide essential air service (EAS) at Clarksburg/Fairmont and Morgantown, WV, for a combined annual subsidy of $2,976,438, and at Beckley, WV, for an annual subsidy of $2,313, 457, for the two-year period from August 1, 2010, through July 31, 2012. Also selecting Gulfstream International Airlines, Inc., to provide EAS at Parkersburg, WV/Marietta, OH, at an annual subsidy rate of $2,642,237, for a two-year period beginning when the carrier inaugurates full EAS through the end of the 24th month thereafter. The total annual subsidy for all four communities is $7,923,132.
  - Order 2012-4-32 (April 30, 2012): selecting Silver Airways to provide Essential Air Service (EAS) at Beckley, Clarksburg/Fairmont ("Clarksburg") and Morgantown, West Virginia, for a combined annual subsidy of $5,968,744 ($2,512,494 for Beckley; $3,456,250 for Clarksburg and Morgantown), for the two-year period beginning when the carrier begins full EAS at all three communities.
