= Maxwelton, West Virginia =

- Unincorporated community
- Location within West Virginia Location within the United States
- Coordinates: 37°51′58″N 80°24′35″W
- Country: United States
- State: West Virginia
- County: Greenbrier
- Elevation: 2,379 ft (725 m)
- Time zone: UTC-5 (Eastern (EST))
  - Summer (DST): UTC-4 (EDT)
- ZIP code: 24957
- Area codes: 304 & 681
- GNIS feature ID

Maxwelton is an unincorporated community in Greenbrier County, West Virginia, United States. Maxwelton is located on U.S. Route 219, 5 miles (8.0 km) north-northeast of Lewisburg. Maxwelton has a post office with ZIP code 24957.

A former variant name was Hattie.

The Greenbrier Valley Airport is located in Maxwelton.
