= Diamond, Logan County, West Virginia =

Unincorporated community in West Virginia, United States

Diamond, West Virginia
- Unincorporated community
- Location within West Virginia Location within the United States
- Coordinates: 37°49′30″N 82°04′53″W
- Country: United States
- State: West Virginia
- County: Logan
- Elevation: 797 ft (243 m)
- Time zone: UTC-5 (Eastern (EST))
  - Summer (DST): UTC-4 (EDT)
- Area codes: 304 & 681
- GNIS feature ID: 1554298

Diamond is an unincorporated community in Logan County, West Virginia, United States. It is part of the Holden census-designated place. Diamond is 5 miles (8.0 km) west-southwest of Logan.
