= Mid-Ohio Valley Regional Airport =

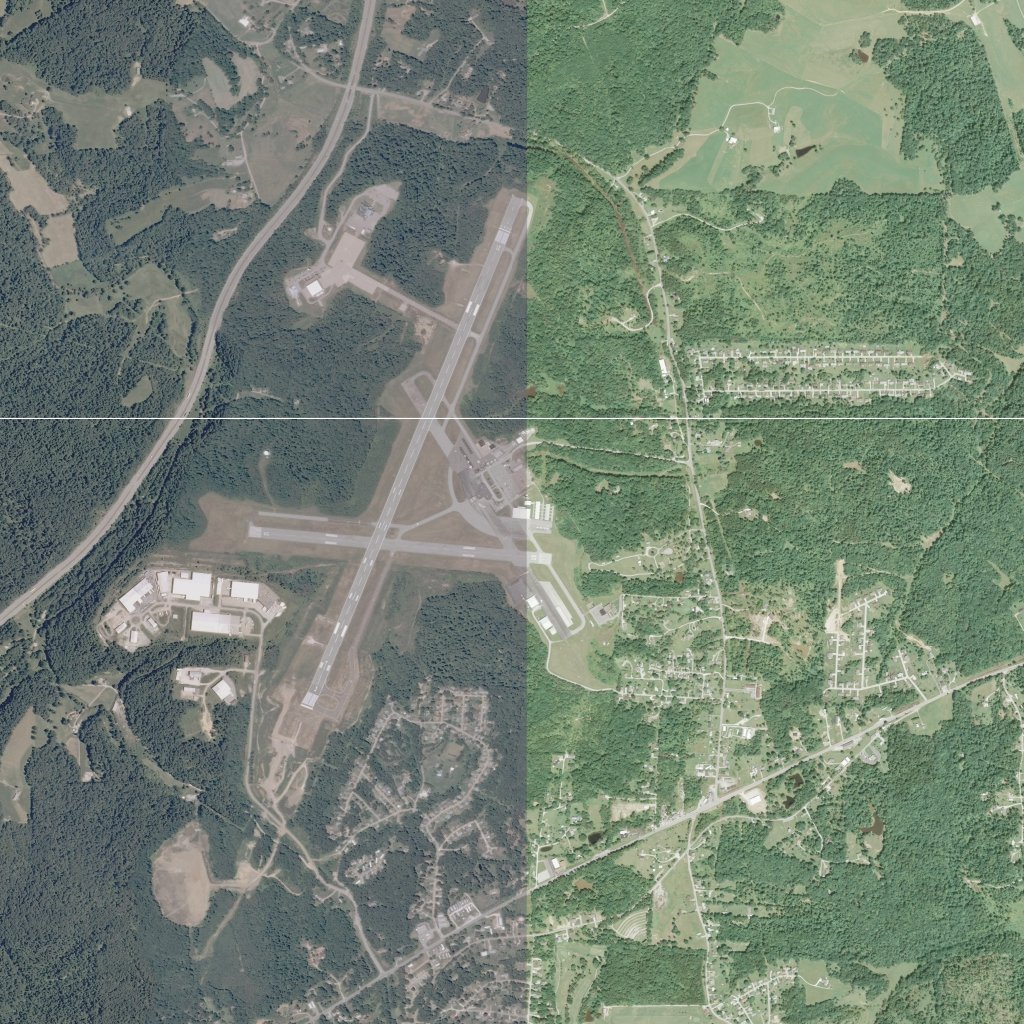
- USGS orthophoto
- IATA: PKB; ICAO: KPKB; FAA LID: PKB

Summary
- Airport type: Public
- Owner: Wood County Airport Authority
- Operator: Wood County Airport Authority
- Serves: Parkersburg, West Virginia and Marietta, Ohio
- Location: 543 Co. Route 31/1, Williamstown, West Virginia, United States
- Elevation AMSL: 859 ft (262 m)
- Coordinates: 39°20′42″N 081°26′22″W
- Website: flymovra.com

Maps
- Location within West Virginia Location within the United States
- Interactive map of Mid-Ohio Valley Regional Airport

Runways
Direction	Length		Surface
Direction	ft	m	Surface
3/21	7,240	2,207	Asphalt
10/28	4,002	1,220	Asphalt

Statistics (2022)
- Aircraft operations (year ending 7/22/2002): 28,053
- Based aircraft: 62
- Source: Federal Aviation Administration

Mid-Ohio Valley Regional Airport (IATA: PKB, ICAO: KPKB, FAA LID: PKB) is seven miles northeast of Parkersburg, in Wood County, West Virginia. It is owned by the Wood County Airport Authority, and is also known as Wood County Airport or Gill Robb Wilson Field. It serves the Mid-Ohio Valley area, which includes the Ohio cities of Marietta, Belpre and the West Virginian cities of Williamstown, Parkersburg, and Vienna. Its scheduled passenger services are subsidized by the Essential Air Service program. The airport itself is located along Interstate 77, just south of the border with Ohio.

According to the Federal Aviation Administration (FAA), the Airport had 5,275 passenger boardings (enplanements) in the calendar year 2008, 5,930 in 2009, and 5,477 in 2010. The National Plan of Integrated Airport Systems for 2011–2015 categorized it as a non-primary commercial service airport.

== History ==
The Parkersburg-Wood County Airport was dedicated on 8 September 1946. Construction of the first part of a three part administration building began in November 1950. By late August 1951, the airport had three 4,400-foot (1,300 m) runways.

The first airline flights were American DC-3s in 1946. The airline All American arrived in 1949 and Piedmont in 1955; Lake Central replaced American in 1961. The first jets were operated by Allegheny at the end of 1976; Piedmont pulled out in 1979 and Allegheny Commuter replaced Allegheny in 1980. Aeromech Airlines offered service to Pittsburgh and Huntington in the early 1980s.

The subtitle Gill Robb Wilson Field was added to the airport's name at a rededication on 2 June 1965.

The airport received a federal grant to expand the runways, add a ramp for general aviation aircraft and perform various other improvements in February 1974. The airport received a federal grant to build a terminal in June 1975.

It was renamed the Mid-Ohio Valley Regional Airport on 1 July 2003.

A proposal to lease a vacant former West Virginia Air National Guard hangar for conversion into a flight school was made in 2017.

An expansion of the West Virginia National Guard facility at the airport was approved by early March 2023. Hangar 4 was renovated in 2024. The airport disapproved of the Department of Transportation's 2025 decision to have Air Wisconsin serve it.

== Facilities ==
The airport covers 1,103 acres (446 ha) at an elevation of 859 feet (262 m). It has two asphalt runways: 3/21 is 7,240 by 150 feet (2,207 x 46 m) and 10/28 is 4,002 by 150 feet (1,220 x 46 m).

In the year ending July 22, 2022, the airport had 28,053 aircraft operations, averaging 77 per day: 65% general aviation, 25% military, and 9% air taxi. 62 aircraft were then based at the airport: 39 single-engine, 11 military, 6 multi-engine, and 6 jet.

== Airline and destinations ==
Airlines	Destinations	Refs.
Contour Airlines	Charlotte; Seasonal: Myrtle Beach	

== Statistics ==
Carrier shares: July 2024 – June 2025
Carrier	Passengers (arriving and departing)
Contour Airlines	8,780(100%)

=== Destination statistics ===
Busiest domestic routes from Mid-Ohio Valley Airport (July 2024 – June 2025)
Rank	City	Passengers
1	Charlotte, North Carolina	3,520
2	Beckley, West Virginia	600

== Accidents ==
- On 15 March 1945, a Beechcraft AT-11 Kansan crashed while attempting to land at the unfinished airport, killing the seven occupants.
- On 4 May 1950, a two-seat Air Force airplane crashed while landing at the airport, killing the pilot.
- In February 1959, a single-engine Cessna crashed near the airport, killing the pilot.
- On 13 March 1968, a Dassault Mystère 20 operated by Mead Paper Company overran the runway, struck trees, crashed into a ravine and caught fire after it attempted to land on an icy runway at the airport, killing the two pilots and four passengers.
- On 24 February 1974, a twin-engine Beechcraft crashed due to engine failure while attempting to land at the airport, killing the pilot and three passengers.
- On 12 August 1977, a twin-engine Beechcraft crashed while attempting to land at the airport, killing the two pilots and two passengers.
- On 18 October 2022, a Beechcraft E90 King Air crashed while preparing to land at the airport, killing the two occupants.

== See also ==
- List of airports in West Virginia
