= Camp Dawson (West Virginia) =

West Virginia Army National Guard facility in Preston County, West Virginia

- Near Kingwood, West Virginia, USA
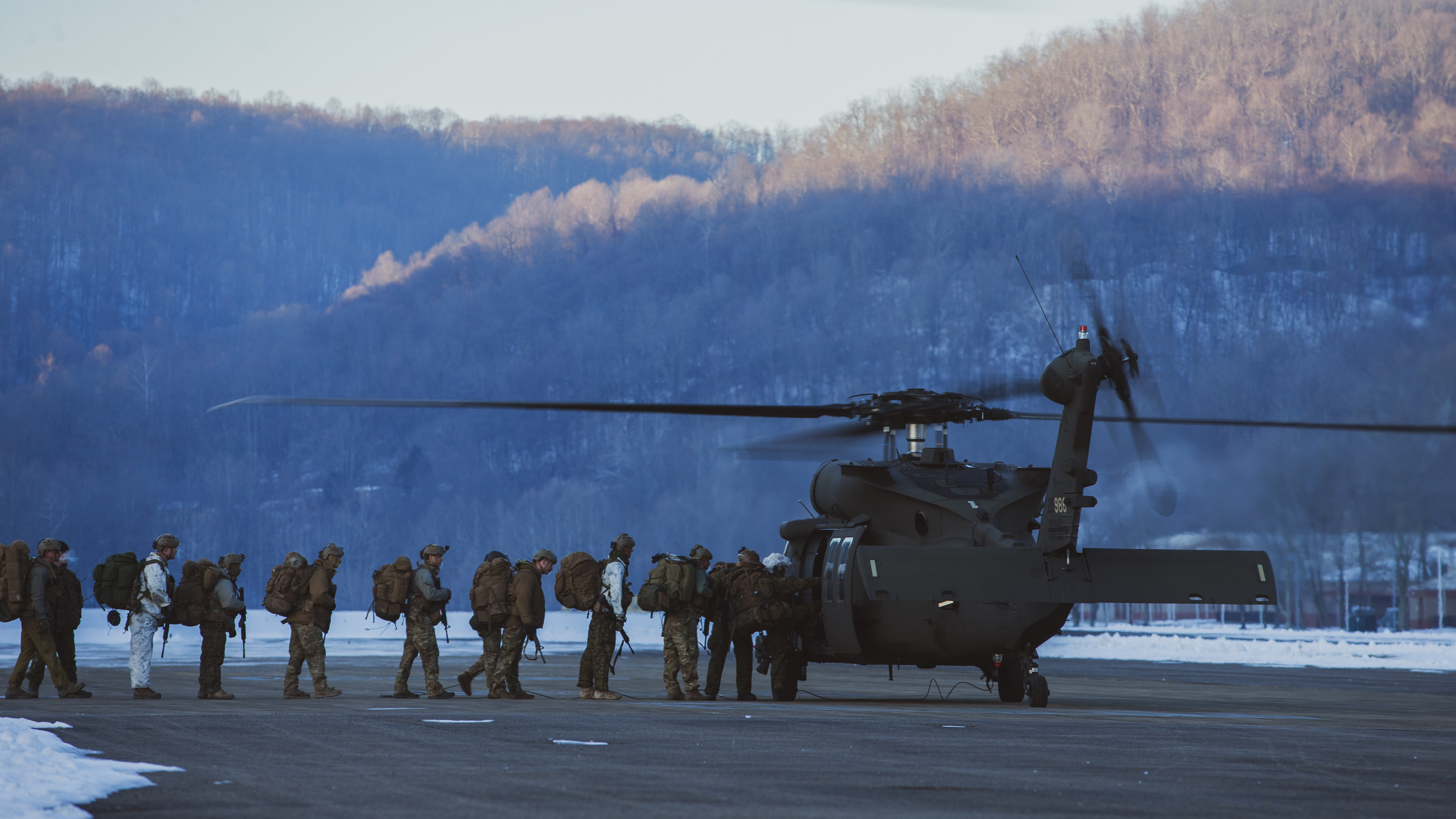
- Marines of 1st Battalion, 2nd Marines board a UH-60 Blackhawk at Camp Dawson in 2022

Site information
- Type: Military training camp
- Controlled by: West Virginia National Guard

Location
- Coordinates: 39°26′43″N 79°40′12″W

Site history
- Built: 1909
- In use: 1909–1917; 1928–present

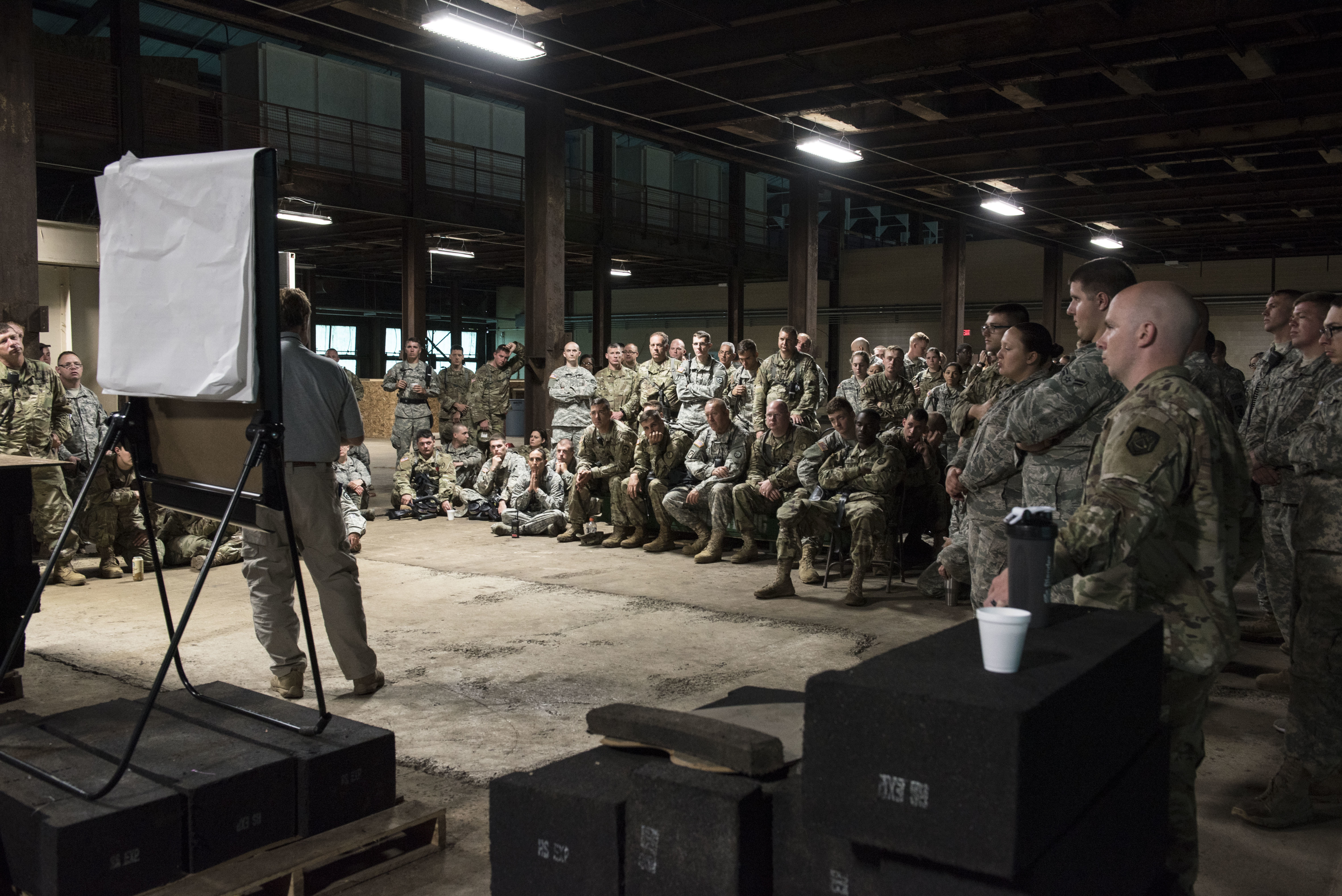
CBRNE Enhanced Response Force Package training occurring at Camp Dawson's Volkstone training site

Camp Dawson is a West Virginia Army National Guard facility in Preston County, West Virginia. It is one of a handful of dedicated military posts operated by the West Virginia National Guard (as opposed to smaller armories), houses the West Virginia Army National Guard's officer candidate school. It is named in honor of William M.O. Dawson, the 12th governor of West Virginia.

== History ==
Camp Dawson was established on May 7, 1909, when the West Virginia Legislature authorized the purchase of 196.5 acres (0.795 km^{2}) of land on Dunkard Bottom along the Cheat River. The camp was named in honor of William M. O. Dawson, a native of Preston County, who had just left office as Governor of West Virginia in 1908. Troops first trained at Camp Dawson during that summer and continued until the entry of the U.S. into World War I in 1917. The camp was not used again until 1928 when it was reestablished as a training site for the West Virginia State Militia, a predecessor organization to the West Virginia National Guard. Units trained regularly at the camp until the outbreak of World War II at which time the state government leased the camp for use as a prisoner of war facility.

Since the original land purchase, six additional tracts have been acquired by the installation bringing the total acreage to 4,177.5 acres (16.906 km^{2}). Training opportunities that are unique to the site and its environs, such as the very rugged local terrain, have attracted U.S Army units and sister military services (both Active and Reserve) for many years.

The campus hosts selection for Delta Force.

== Tenant units ==
- C Company, 2nd Battalion, 19th Special Forces Group (Airborne)
- 197th Regiment (Regional Training Institute)
- SOD-E (Special Operations Detachment - Europe)
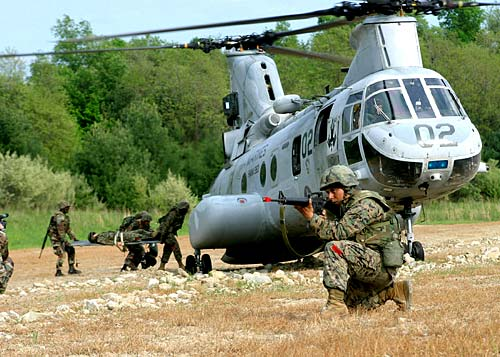
  Marines training at Camp Dawson on 13 May 2004

== Dawson Army Airfield ==
The first airfield at Camp Dawson, Dawson Army Airfield, was constructed in the early 1970s on the left-descending bank of the Cheat River across from the Camp Dawson base. By 1976, this was replaced with the current airfield on the right-descending bank just south of the main base.
