= Standard, West Virginia =

- Unincorporated community
- Location within West Virginia Location within the United States
- Coordinates: 38°08′10″N 81°24′02″W
- Country: United States
- State: West Virginia
- County: Kanawha
- Elevation: 686 ft (209 m)
- Time zone: UTC-5 (Eastern (EST))
  - Summer (DST): UTC-4 (EDT)
- Area codes: 304 & 681
- GNIS feature ID: 1547325

Standard is an unincorporated community in Kanawha County, West Virginia, United States. The community is located near Exit 74 on the West Virginia Turnpike (Interstates 64 and 77) north of the Fayette County line.
