= Holden, West Virginia =

- Census-designated place
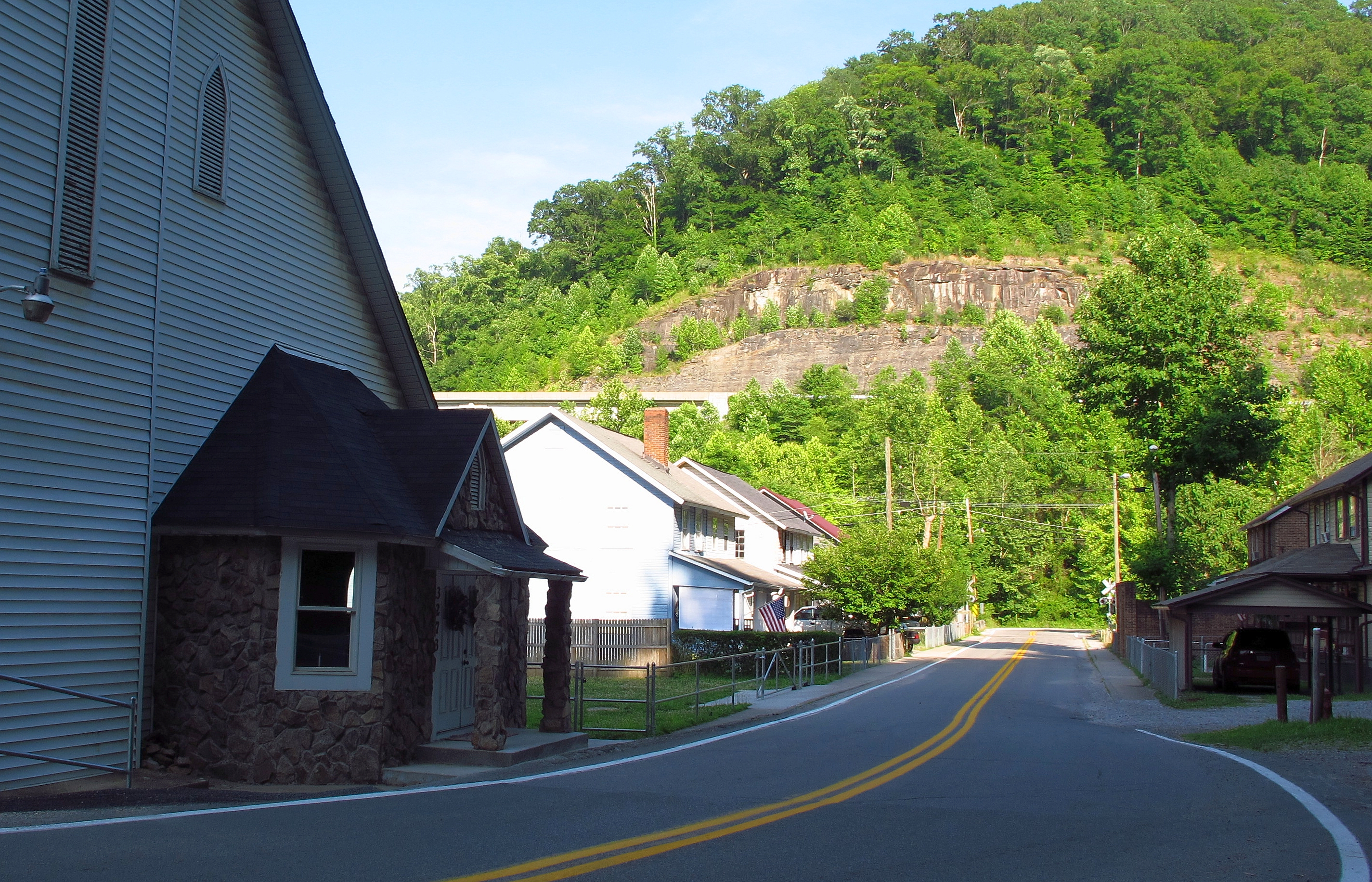
- Trace Avenue in Holden

- Location within West Virginia Location within the United States
- Coordinates: 37°49′7″N 82°3′42″W
- Country: United States
- State: West Virginia
- County: Logan

Area
  - Total: 3.73 sq mi (9.67 km^{2})
  - Land: 3.73 sq mi (9.67 km^{2})
  - Water: 0 sq mi (0.0 km^{2})
- Elevation: 735 ft (224 m)

Population (2020)
  - Total: 783
  - Density: 210/sq mi (81.0/km^{2})
- Time zone: UTC-5 (Eastern (EST))
  - Summer (DST): UTC-4 (EDT)
- ZIP code: 25625
- Area code: 304
- FIPS code: 54-37948
- GNIS feature ID: 1540381

Holden is a census-designated place (CDP) in Logan County, West Virginia, United States. The population was 876 at the 2010 census, down from 1,105 in 2000. By 2020, the population further dropped to 783. The CDP contains the unincorporated communities of Holden, Beebe, Frogtown, Sycamore, Diamond, and Davis, all in the valley of Copperas Mine Fork.

== Geography ==
Holden is located in western Logan County along Copperas Mine Fork, a tributary of Island Creek and part of the Guyandotte River watershed. It is 4 miles (6 km) southwest of Logan, the county seat. U.S. Route 119, a four-lane freeway, passes just east of Holden village, leading north 56 miles (90 km) to Charleston, the state capital, and southwest 51 miles (82 km) to Pikeville, Kentucky.

According to the United States Census Bureau, the Holden CDP has a total area of 3.7 square miles (9.7 km^{2}), of which 0.1 acres (534 m^{2}), or less than 0.01%, are water.

== Demographics ==
At the 2000 census there were 1,105 people, 436 households, and 324 families living in the CDP. The population density was 113.1 people per square mile (43.7/km^{2}). There were 488 housing units at an average density of 49.9/sq mi (19.3/km^{2}). The racial makeup of the CDP was 90.23% White, 8.87% African American, 0.18% Asian, 0.09% from other races, and 0.63% from two or more races. Hispanic or Latino of any race were 0.27%.

Of the 436 households 27.5% had children under the age of 18 living with them, 53.2% were married couples living together, 17.7% had a female householder with no husband present, and 25.5% were non-families. 23.4% of households were one person and 12.6% were one person aged 65 or older. The average household size was 2.51 and the average family size was 2.95.

The age distribution was 23.1% under the age of 18, 9.3% from 18 to 24, 26.8% from 25 to 44, 26.0% from 45 to 64, and 14.8% 65 or older. The median age was 40 years. For every 100 females, there were 85.7 males. For every 100 females age 18 and over, there were 79.3 males.

The median household income was $23,510 and the median family income was $30,750. Males had a median income of $24,653 versus $21,316 for females. The per capita income for the CDP was $11,615. About 19.4% of families and 20.9% of the population were below the poverty line, including 30.1% of those under age 18 and 23.9% of those age 65 or over.

== History ==
The settlement was built between 1902 and 1915, by mining engineer Albert F. "Bert" Holden, who wanted to build a model mining town. Located along Copperas Mine Fork, the settlement had a band mill and a brick-making plant to meet the building needs of the community, and all structures were made from local materials including stones from a nearby quarry. In 1907, a mining engineer wrote:

The town of Holden is most attractive and most worthy of praise and approval. All houses are provided with electric lights, open grates and porches, water from driven wells and tastefully painted. A more orderly, more attractive, or more wisely planned and managed community does not exist in the state of West Virginia.

By 1909, 400 buildings had been constructed including houses, stores, barns, a machine shop, a carpenter shop, a blacksmith shop, and a power plant. The center of the community was described as "Main Holden".

== Notable people ==
- Max Butcher, baseball pitcher of the 1930s and 1940s; born in Holden
- Jack Dempsey, heavyweight boxing champion
