= Wheeling Ohio County Airport =

Airport in West Virginia, US

Coordinates: 40°10′30″N 080°38′47″W

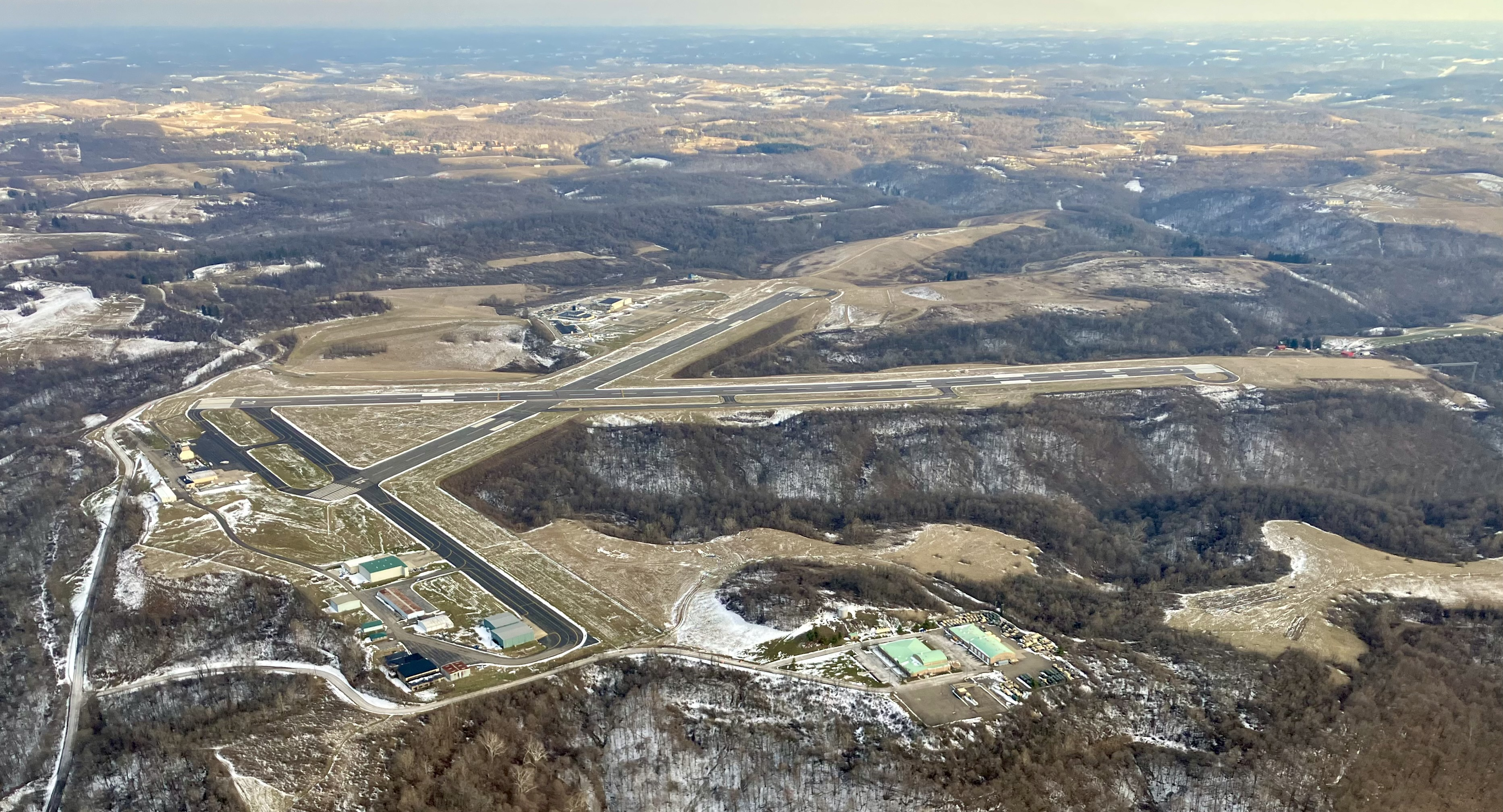
- IATA: HLG; ICAO: KHLG; FAA LID: HLG

Summary
- Airport type: Public
- Owner: Ohio County Commission
- Serves: Wheeling, West Virginia
- Elevation AMSL: 1,194 ft / 364 m

Runways
Direction	Length		Surface
Direction	ft	m	Surface
3/21	5,002	1,525	Asphalt
16/34	4,499	1,371	Asphalt

Statistics (2022)
- Aircraft operations (year ending 7/8/2022): 16,496
- Based aircraft: 33
- Source: Federal Aviation Administration

Wheeling Ohio County Airport (IATA: HLG, ICAO: KHLG, FAA LID: HLG) is a public airport serving Wheeling and Ohio County, West Virginia, United States. It is eight miles (13 km) northeast of downtown Wheeling and is owned by the Ohio County Commission.

== History ==
The first passenger airline flights were TWA and Capital DC-3s in 1947; All American Airways arrived in 1949. Lake Central arrived at the beginning of 1961 and TWA and Capital left that year. Allegheny was replaced by Allegheny Commuter in 1969-70 and Wheeling lost all service ten years later. Lake Central Airlines served Wheeling until their merger with Allegheny Airlines in 1968. It wasn't Allegheny Commuter that served Wheeling, but Allegheny, until they stopped service in 1970. According to the April 26, 1970 Allegheny timetable, AL had two round trips to Pittsburgh, using their own CV-580 prop jets. 1970 was the last year with local carrier airline service. In the later 1970s two commuter carriers started round trip service PIT-HLG within days of each other, providing up to seven departures a day. Aeromech (Clarksburg WV) and Christman Air System (Washington, PA) used EMB 110 planes (18 passengers), and Christman used Beech 99s (15 seats). Neither service lasted very long, due to lack of demand.

== Facilities ==
The airport covers 1,000 acres (405 ha) and has two asphalt runways: 3/21 is 5,002 ft × 150 ft (1,525 m × 46 m) and 16/34 is 4,499 ft × 150 ft (1,371 m × 46 m).

In the year ending July 8, 2022, the airport had 16,496 aircraft operations, average 45 per day: 90% general aviation, and 9% air taxi. 33 aircraft were then based at this airport: 13 single-engine, 2 multi-engine, 1 jet, 5 helicopters, and 12 military.

== Accidents ==
- On October 13, 1966, a Lockheed 18 Lodestar operated by BBR Drilling stalled and crashed after takeoff when the #2 propeller governor drive shaft failed. There were 2 fatalities out of the 5 occupants on board.

== See also ==
- List of airports in West Virginia
