= Gertrude A. Muller =

American entrepreneur and inventor (1887–1954)

Ms. Gertrude A. Muller
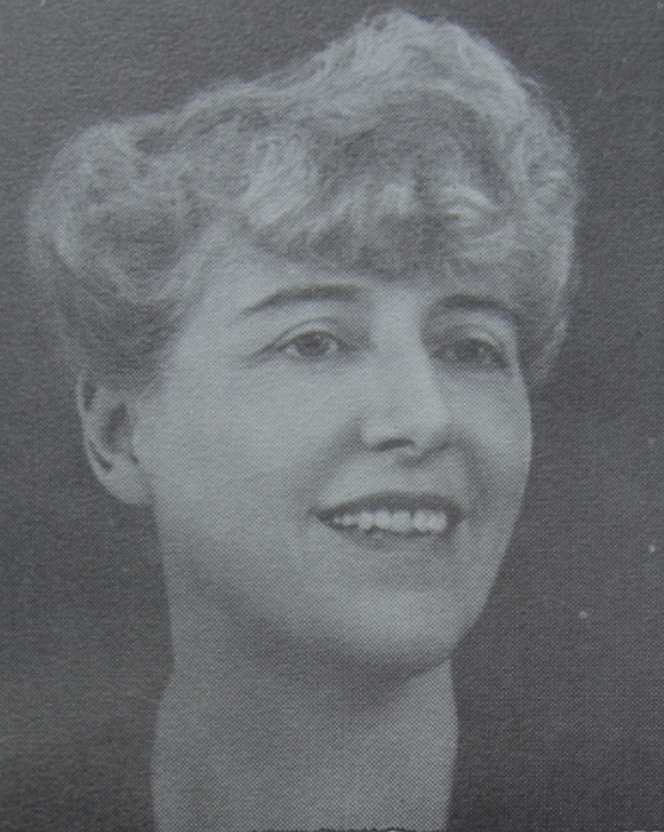
- Gertrude Muller, ca. 1925
- Born: June 9, 1887; Leo, Indiana, United States
- Died: October 13, 1954 (aged 67); Fort Wayne, Indiana, United States
- Resting place: Lindenwood Cemetery; 41.0773148777°N 85.1717657264°W
- Education: International Business College (Fort Wayne, Indiana)
- Occupations: Businesswoman and inventor

Gertrude Agnes Muller (June 9, 1887 – October 13, 1954) was an American businesswoman, entrepreneur, and inventor. She was dedicated to developing safer childrearing standards and is credited with inventing the first folding potty chair and one of the first children's car seats. Additionally, she was a pioneer in the use of crash testing for product safety.

== Biography ==
At different points throughout her life, Gertrude was a member of the Business and Professional Women's Club, the American Home Economics Association, the Fort Wayne Saddle & Bridle Club, and the Fort Wayne Women's Club. As an adult, she became an active member of the local Congregational church and dressed as Uncle Sam to sell war bonds during World War II.

=== Early life ===
Gertrude Agnes Muller was born on June 9, 1887, in Leo, Indiana to Victor Muller and Catherine Baker. She was the third of the couple's five eventual children and the second of their three daughters. Her mother was a homemaker and her father was the son of one of the founders of the town of Leo, Indiana. Her parents owned two farms, an apple orchard, and a gravel pit, in addition to both the town's post office and its general store. Gertrude's early childhood was relatively carefree until Victor Muller's unexpected death in 1893 when she was only six years old.

Left with five young children and few other options, Gertrude's mother Catherine moved the family back to her hometown of Fort Wayne, Indiana. The family was forced to take in lodgers, as they suddenly fold themselves holding significantly less wealth and influence than they had previously. The rest of Gertrude's childhood was marked by poverty until her mother found some success in property investment and the sale of baked goods, allowing the family to acquire property themselves. Catherine shared her growing business knowledge with her daughter throughout her childhood, providing Gertrude with an expansive idea of the opportunities available to women in the early 20th century.

=== Adulthood ===
While receiving what she considered to be a "meager" secretarial education from International Business College in Fort Wayne, Gertrude read extensively in the areas of human development, health, and nutrition. Continuing to read on the side, she got her first job in 1904 when she was only seventeen, working as a stenographer for the General Electric Company's local manufacturing facility. She held this job until 1910, when a family friend helped her to get a job at Van Arnam Manufacturing Company. Gertrude served as the assistant to the president of the company, which manufactured wooden toilet seats, for four years before she was promoted to assistant manager in 1914.

=== Death ===
Gertrude Muller died on October 13, 1954, in Fort Wayne, Indiana after a long bout with cancer of the spine. She was buried alongside her mother in Lindenwood Cemetery. She attended Plymouth Congregational Church in Fort Wayne, where she had been an active member for more than forty years.

== Business ==
In the late 1910s, while Gertrude was still working at Van Arnam Manufacturing Company, her younger sister Margaret had a mortifying experience while traveling with her young daughter, Helen. While carrying their luggage through the lobby of a fancy hotel, a strategically placed blanket slipped – exposing a bulky, do-it-yourself toilet seat she had engineered for her toilet-training child. After returning to Fort Wayne the young mother complained to her sister about her utter embarrassment, and soon after hearing of it Gertrude embarked on a lifelong journey to ease the day-to-day life of mothers and their young children.

=== Juvenile Wood products ===
Gertrude worked with her sister, Margaret Muller Cox, to develop a seat for toilettraining that was both more convenient for mothers and more comfortable for toddlers. Her first wooden prototype featured armrests and a small footrest, and it was capable of fitting onto either a full-sized toilet or its own basin and stand. She called it the "Little Toidey." The first seats were made by Van Arnam Manufacturing until Gertrude tried and failed to sell her product through plumbers. Perhaps unsurprisingly, mothers weren't particularly interested in buying children's products from the men who fixed their toilets, so her initial product was not successful.

Undaunted by her initial failure, Gertrude Muller established the Juvenile Wood Products Company in 1924 and installed herself as president. She found quick success by switching her marketing from plumbers to baby shops, boutiques, and department stores. Gertrude's success allowed her to provide several of her family members with reliable employment through the Great Depression. Her older sister Mary Katherine Muller, soon left her teaching position to become vice president of the company. She had previously earned a master's degree in child psychology from Columbia University, so she took on additional roles at the company in the areas of educational promotion and research.

=== The Toidey Company, Inc. ===
As many businesses left wooden materials behind in favor of plastic following World War II, Gertrude followed suit and renamed her company The Toidey Company, Inc. in 1945. Around the same time she moved her factory and office to a larger building in town, a former riding academy. All products created by both Juvenile Wood Products and The Toidey Company were manufactured in Muller's hometown of Fort Wayne, Indiana. Her products could be identified by their unchanging trademark logo, two sentry rabbits that framed the name of whatever product they adorned. At the time of Gertrude's death in 1954, The Toidey Company was purchased by a group of investors who continued to manufacture baby furniture under the Toidey name until the late 1970s.

=== Educational pamphlets ===
From their inception Gertrude's companies packaged their products with educational pamphlets that were almost always written by Ms. Muller herself. Expectant mothers and home economics students could even write in to the company to receive free educational material without ever purchasing anything. The pamphlets were regarded as reliable sources of information among the pediatricians and teachers who handed them out.

The most popular pamphlet distributed by The Toidey Company was "Training the Baby." Initially published by Juvenile Wood Products in 1930, the pamphlet was continuously updated and revised through 1950. "Training the Baby" was packaged with every Toidey seat and encouraged parents to "make their baby comfortable" and to "be relaxed about toilet training." A later pamphlet written by Muller that gained popularity was titled "Make Baby Regular."

=== Crash testing ===
Gertrude Muller's number one priority was the safety of children, a determination that only increased with the growing popularity of automobiles. She became especially interested in this area of safety as her company began manufacturing children's safety seats. In 1952, Muller worked with engineers from Cornell University on some of the first crash testing to determine what happens to a child during an automobile accident.

In 1954, Gertrude was invited to the White House conference on Highway Safety. The National Safety Council named her a National Veteran of Safety for her efforts to improve children's lives. At the time, Gertrude was only the third woman to receive such a nomination.

== Notable products ==
By the end of her career Gertrude Muller was best known for solving "two of the more perplexing challenges facing a young child in the 20th century: how to use the toilet without falling in, and how to see out of an automobile window." She invented numerous other items meant to ease the lives of mothers and encourage the safe independence of their children, including the following:

- Comfy-Safe Auto Seat, (1929).
- Little Two-Step, (1929).
- Toidey One-Step, (1931).
- Little Toidey, (1949).
- Toidey Specimen Collector, (1948).

=== Toilet training ===
Gertrude Muller's first and most notable invention was the Little Toidey, one of the first potty chairs. The product was initially manufactured in metal and wood, though models made after 1945 were made of plastic. The Little Toidey featured its own basin for traveling, and fit onto a full-size toilet while at home. An article published in Children, the Magazine for Parents in 1927 encouraged mothers to ask their local stores to carry the Little Toidey as the product "saves oceans of work." The seat appeared alongside toilet training advice in the childrearing manual Mother and Baby Care in Pictures written by Louise Zabriskie in 1935.

Eventually Muller's company also offered the "Little Two-Step," a small set of steps to aid a toddler in independently accessing a standard-height sink or toilet. An advertisement published in 1938 included images of the Little Two-Step being used by a toddler to access his Little Toidey safely. The same advertisement, published in Volume 16 of Hygeia: A Journal of Individual and Community Health, included the claim that doctors recommended the Little Toidey for toilet training infants.

=== Car seats ===
On August 16, 1928, Gertrude and Juvenile Wood Products filed the patents for the first Comfy-Safe Auto Seat. They specifically did not claim the words "safe auto seat" apart from the item name itself. The Comfy-Safe seat featured a metal frame that anchored between the bottom and back of the car seat and allowed children to sit approximately a foot higher than they would have otherwise, providing them with the opportunity to look out of the windows of the car. The seat also featured a buckling nylon strap to prevent the child from falling out in the event of a sudden stop or collision.

== Legacy ==
Though she never married or had children of her own, Gertrude dedicated her life to advancing the safety and comfort of children everywhere. Her free time was spent with her family, even living with and supporting her aging mother for many years. Additionally, Gertrude paid for her nieces and nephews to receive college educations.

The Fort Wayne public library published a collection of essays on local women titled Hidden Heroines in 1976. The book featured a section written by Catherine Miller titled Gertrude Muller: The Babies' Industrialist.

=== Collections ===
For the bicentennial of Indiana's statehood in 2016, the Fort Wayne History Center organized a yearlong exhibition of 200 objects that they determined to have been most influential in the history of the area titled 200@200. Included in the Forward Through Innovation section of the exhibition was a late 1940s, plastic model Toidey Seat that had been used by the donor's young children. The Smithsonian Institution's National Museum of American History holds an early 1950s model Little Toidey that was owned by a family in Bethesda, Maryland. The museum also holds advertising for the Little Toidey that was published in Low Supply Co.'s trade catalog.

== See also ==
- Child safety seat
- Child protection
