= Lewis McGee =

Lewis McGee may refer to:

- Lewis McGee (soldier), Australian soldier
- Lewis Allen McGee, Unitarian minister and activist
