= Elkhart Township, Indiana =

Elkhart Township is the name of two townships in the U.S. state of Indiana:

- Elkhart Township, Elkhart County, Indiana
- Elkhart Township, Noble County, Indiana
