= Brigadier General Charles E. McGee Library =

Public library in Silver Spring, Maryland, US

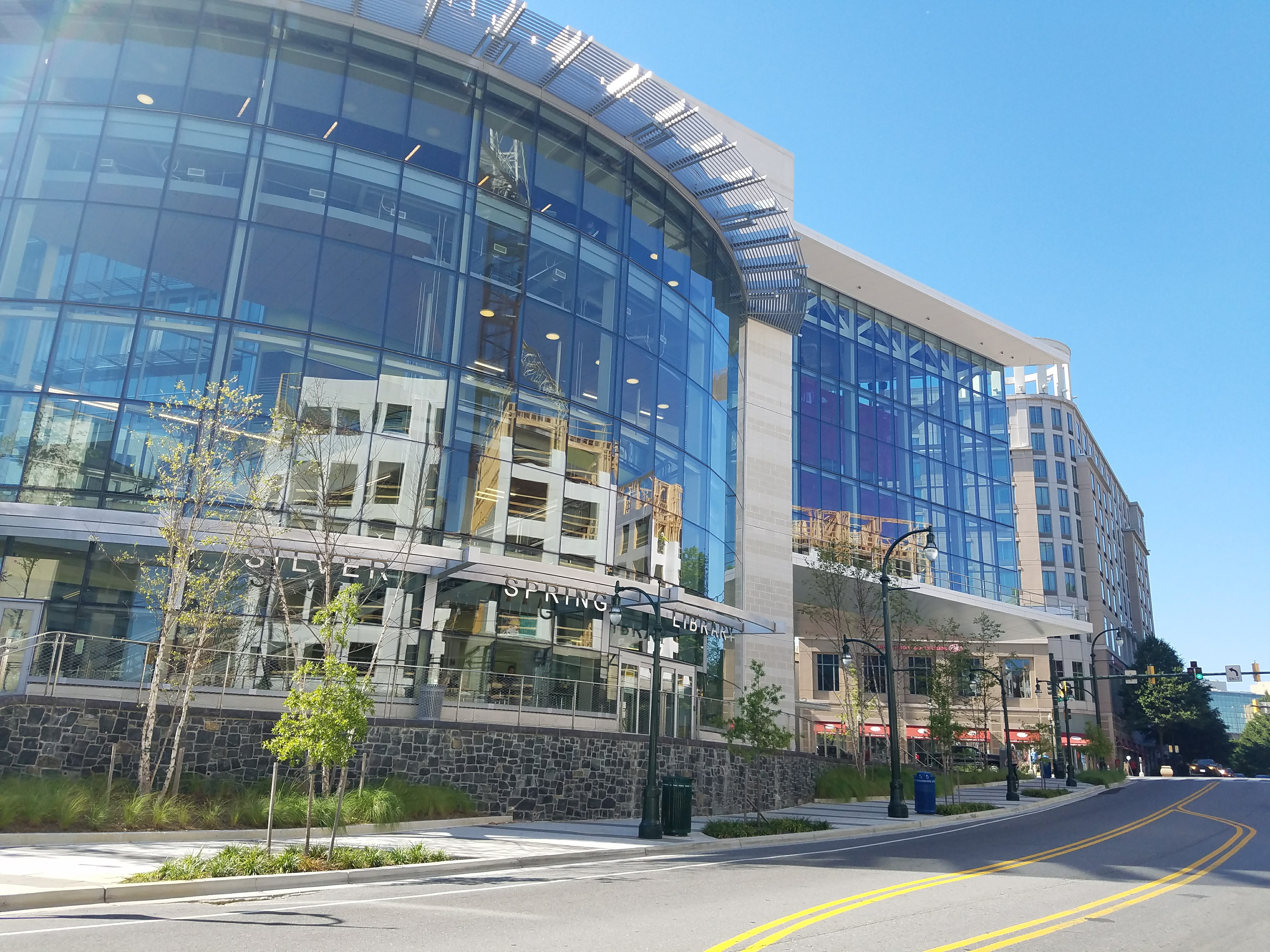
- The exterior of the library across Fenton St.
- 38.9949°N 77.0245°W
- Location: 900 Wayne Avenue, Silver Spring, Maryland 20910, United States
- Type: Public library
- Established: 1931; 95 years ago
- Branch of: Montgomery County Public Libraries

Access and use
- Population served: 76,716

Other information
- Website: Official website

The Brigadier General Charles E. McGee Library, formerly the Silver Spring Library, is part of the Montgomery County Public Libraries System. It opened to the public in 1931 and is currently located at 900 Wayne Avenue in Silver Spring, Maryland. The library is named for Charles E. McGee, a Tuskegee Airman who had lived in Montgomery County.

== History ==
=== Early locations ===
Silver Spring Library began service in 1931 at East Silver Spring Elementary School.

In 1934, the library moved to Jesup Blair Community House, also known as "The Moorings." Architect Howard Wright Cutler remodeled the building to serve as a library, and his work earned the building a nomination for placement on the National Register of Historic Places in 1975. The library operated out of the Jesup Blair House for 23 years.

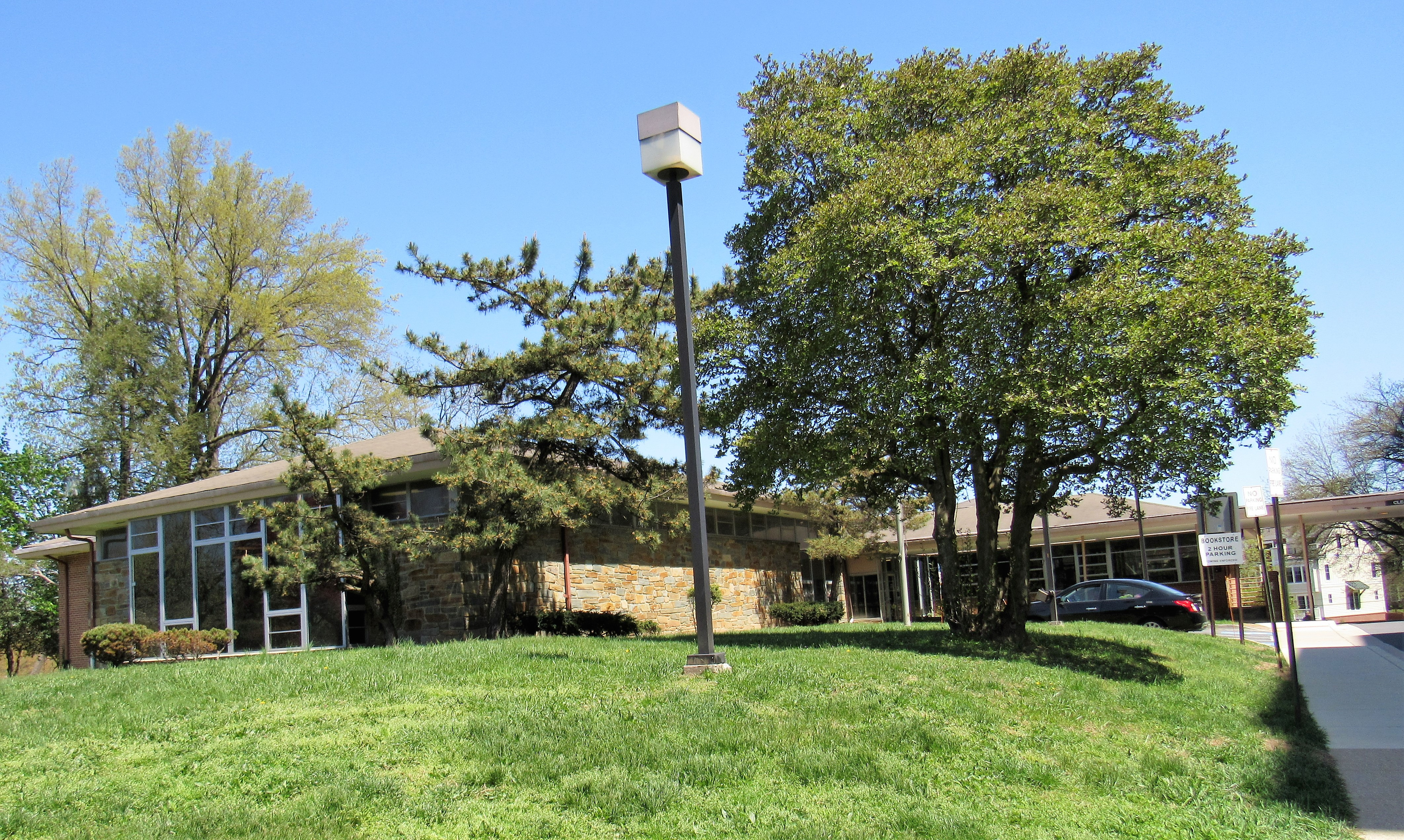
The 1957 Silver Spring Library building

=== Colesville Road (1957–2015) ===
The library opened a building of its own at 8901 Colesville Road in 1957, on land donated by the Hecht Company. At this location, the library occupied a building dedicated exclusively for the library's use for the first time.

Ellsworth Urban Park was created in an area covering 3.6 acres (1.5 ha) beside the library in 1979. The park has two playground areas where parents can take their children to play, and a tennis court.

In 1990, Marcia Billig's sculpture Lion and the Mouse was installed in the grass of the library.

A celebration of 58 years of service was held on March 15, 2015, the last day of service at the Colesville Road location.

=== Current location (2015–present) ===
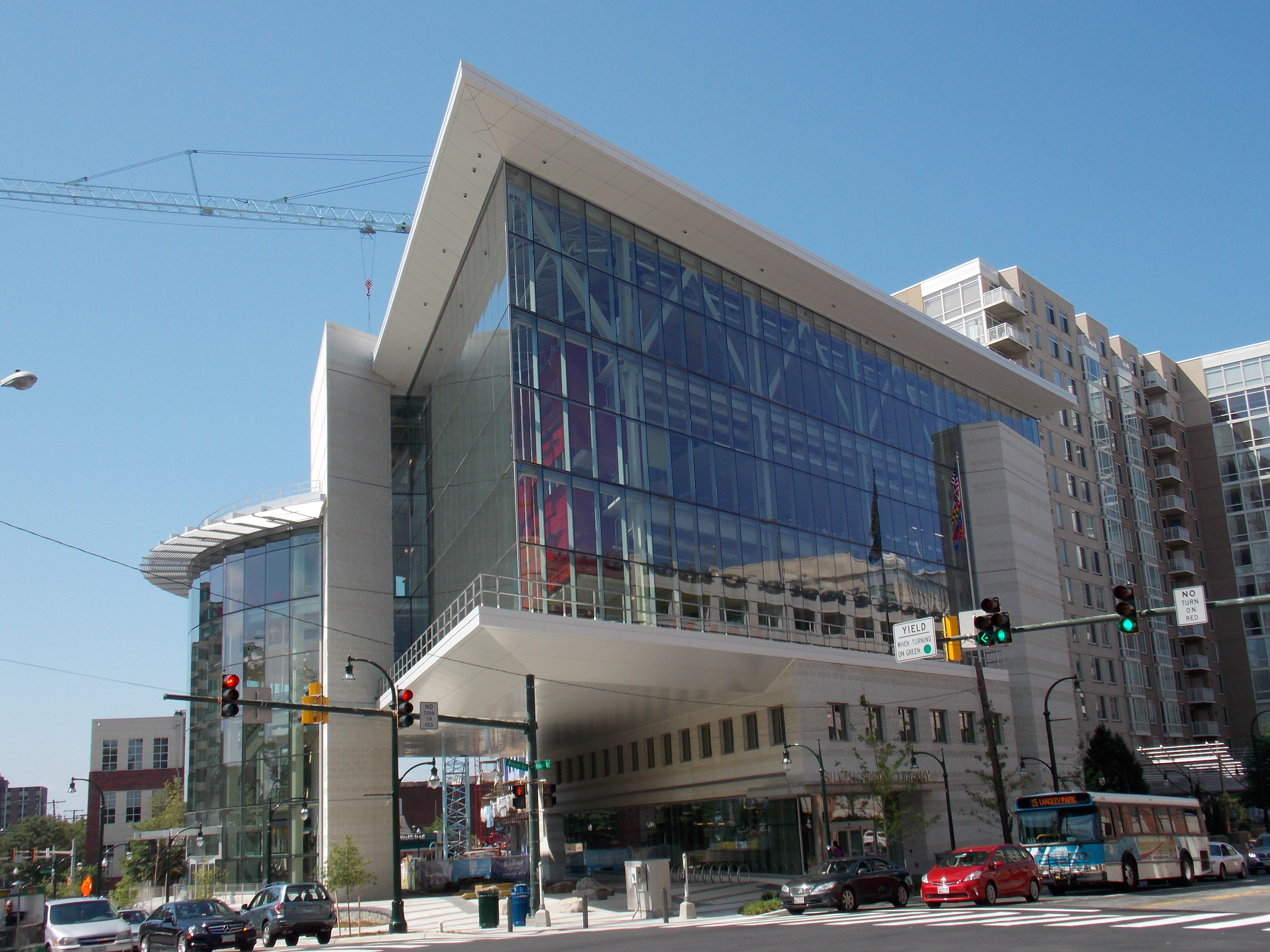
The 2015 building from the corner of Wayne and Fenton

The current library location at 900 Wayne Avenue in Silver Spring was opened on June 20, 2015. The facility was built for $64 million, including the acquisition of 1.46 acres (0.59 ha) of land, preparation of the site, design, construction, furniture, equipment and funds to improve the collection. Construction was to cost $23 million, but $3 million was taken to renovate the Fillmore, a music venue nearby in downtown Silver Spring. The ground floor of the seven-story building has a coffee shop and a platform for the future Purple Line light rail station. In 2022, the library was renamed for Brigadier General Charles E. McGee, a Tuskegee Airman who had lived in Montgomery County.

- 1st and 2nd floors: Drop-off window, cafe, county offices, meeting rooms, and artists studios.
- 3rd floor: Customer service, movies, teen books, conference room, meeting rooms, Mac lab (teens), study rooms, pick-up area, drop off area.
- 4th floor: Books, audiobooks, CDs, newspapers and magazines room, conference and study rooms, computer rooms.
- 5th floor: Children's floor.

== Collection ==
The library has a collection of 90,000 books, magazines, downloadable music, e-books, and a World Language Collection in Amharic, Chinese, French, Spanish, and Vietnamese, organized in the following way:

=== Teens collection (third floor) ===
- Pick up holds section
- DVD 7 days express
- DVD TV series
- Express DVD section
- New fiction for children
- Books for teens: Fiction, non fiction, graphic novels, manga.

=== Adults collection (fourth floor) ===
- Reading books (with magazines and newspapers)
- Audiobooks section
- Shelves organized by Dewey Decimal classification (000 to 999)
- World languages.
- Biographies organized by subjects last name.
- Fiction, new books large type fiction (by author's last name).
- Non fiction (by author's last name).
- Graphic novels
- Mystery & new mystery
- Romance
- Librarian's choice

=== Children's collection (fifth floor) ===
- Picture books
- New picture books
- Beginning readers
- DVDs & Vox books (printed and audio books)
- Braille books
- Series books
- Audio books
- Fiction books for 2nd to 5th grade.
- Children internet computers
- Biographies & reference
- Library center
- World languages
- Children internet computers.

=== Other resources ===
In 2016, the library also offered:

- 47 all-in-one computers with Core i5 processor at 3 GHz, 8 GB RAM, webcam, 1080p/23" screen, an Intel HD Graphics 4600, USB ports, DVD-RW drives, 256 GB Solid-state drive and 30 Mbit/s download/105 Mbit/s upload Internet access each one.
- Six iMac computers
- A business center with a scanner, and copier/printer.

== Services ==
- Library cards: Free for Montgomery County and D.C. area residents and students and are valid for 1 year. Money can be added to library cards to be used for printing of documents.
- Each user can borrow up 100 books and magazines for 3 weeks, that can be renewed up to 3 times.
- Each user can borrow up to 20 movies every week and most of them can be renewed up to 3 times.
- Each user can borrow audiobooks and ebooks for up to 3 weeks.
- Each user can borrow e-books from 3M dispenser machines with 3M book readers and on-line using Overdrive and 3M applications for PC, Kindle tablets, Nook tablets, and so forth. e-books can also be downloaded to a computer, and using Adobe Digital Editions software, these books can be uploaded to classic versions of Kindle and Nook.
- Hold lockers where users can pick up 24/7 books that were reserved.
- Drop off area available 24/7, where users can return books that were borrowed with. The use of RFID technology allow to return books to the system automatically.
- Automated borrowing: Spots with RFID scanners were users can borrow books by themselves.
- Mango Languages: Online language learning website for Montgomery County Public Libraries users.
- Muzzy Online: An interactive language learning website for children with animations and games, free for Montgomery County Public Libraries users.
- LibX toolbar: Allow to search from Montgomery County Public Libraries catalog from a toolbar on your web browser. Available for Firefox and Chrome.

=== Study rooms ===
The library has 14 study rooms with space for up to 8 people. Study rooms can be reserved online every week, and can be used once a day for up to 2 hours every day.

=== Printers and scanners ===
The library has four multi-function printers that can be used with a library card. Scanning of documents is free and can be stored via USB flash drives. Documents can be printed from any computer in the library and have a cost of 15 cents per black-and-white page and $1 per color page.

=== Hotspot ===
The library also has a free hotspot with up to 10 MiB/s of throughput for visitors with personal laptops, tablets or smartphones.

=== Online services and mobile applications ===
Montgomery County Public Libraries works with more than ten providers of online services and companies that offer desktop access but also developed their own applications for mobile devices such as tablets, cellphones (such as Android and iPhone), and Kindle that use its services.

Among the apps are the following:

- OverDrive Media Console/Libby: Application to download e-books using Montgomery County Public Library accounts. Available for iOS, Android, Android for Kindle, Blackberry. and Windows phone.
- Flipster: Application to read free digital magazine provided from your library.
- Mango Languages: An online language learning resource free for library users where can be learn more than 70 languages. Available for iOS, Android and Android for Kindle.
- Access My Library: Tool that helps to look for libraries by market and distance, and also allow to search items on library catalogs, read biographies, articles, journals, etc. Available for iOS and Android.
- Kanopy: It is an on-demand streaming video platform for public libraries and universities that offers films and documentaries. All the users have access to the Kanopy kids subdivision.

=== Courtesy charging stations ===
Three courtesy charging stations are available, with connectors, where visitors can charge cellphones and tablets.

== Accessibility ==
The library follows Accessibility regulations:

- Wheelchair ramps at both entrances.
- Four ADA computers that follow the Americans with Disabilities Act for persons with visual impairment or physical disabilities.
- Two wide elevators:
  - Fenton St. elevator (located beside Kefa Cafe) has access from 1st floor to 3rd, 4th and 5th floors and from 4th and 5th floor to 3rd floor
  - Wayne Ave. elevator from 1st to 3rd (main) floor and from 3rd floor to 1st floor.
- 7 restrooms, each with baby changing stations.
- Air conditioning to cool the library in summer, heat pumps to warm it in winter, and ventilation on every floor.

== See also ==
- Montgomery County, Maryland
