= Davis Library =

Davis Library may refer to:

- Davis Library, branch of the Montgomery County Public Libraries system in Maryland
- Walter Royal Davis Library, main library of the University of North Carolina at Chapel Hill library system
