= Wawaka, Indiana =

- Unincorporated community and Census designated place
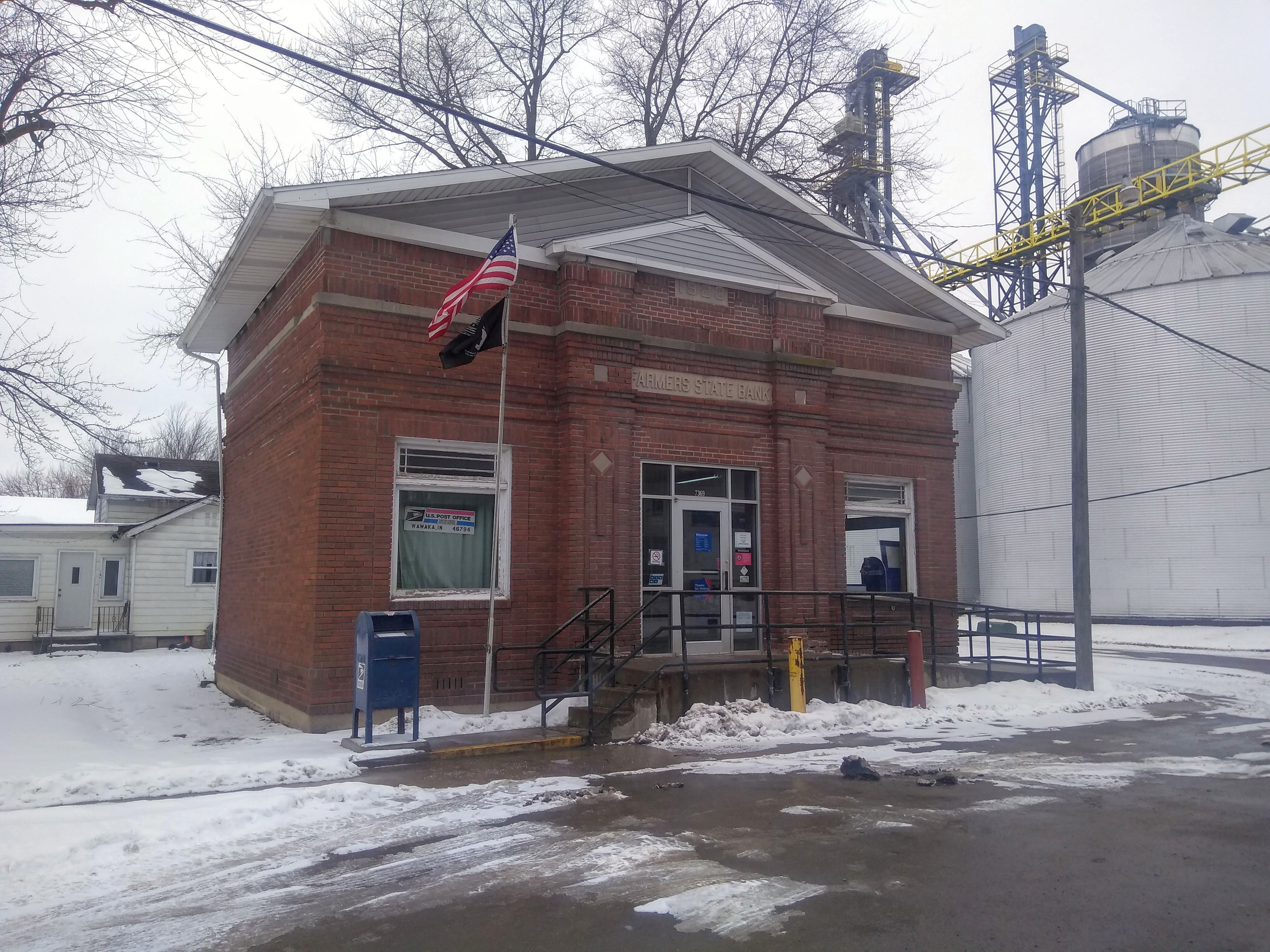
- Wawaka's post office

- Location within Indiana Location within the United States
- Coordinates: 41°27′36″N 85°29′00″W
- Country: United States
- State: Indiana
- County: Noble
- Township: Elkhart
- Elevation: 902 ft (275 m)
- Time zone: UTC-5 (Eastern (EST))
  - Summer (DST): UTC-4 (EDT)
- ZIP code: 46794
- Area code: 260
- FIPS code: 18-81530
- GNIS feature ID: 2830483

Wawaka is an unincorporated community in Elkhart Township, Noble County, in the U.S. state of Indiana.

== History ==
Wawaka was founded in 1857. The name Wawaka is said to be of Native American origin, meaning "big heron". A post office has been in operation at Wawaka since 1857.

== Demographics ==
Historical population
Census	Pop.	Note	%±
2023 (est.)	102

The United States Census Bureau defined Wawaka as a census designated place in the 2022 American Community Survey.

== Notable people ==
- Ford Frick, sportswriter and third commissioner of Major League Baseball (MLB)
