= Baby furniture =

Furniture created for babies

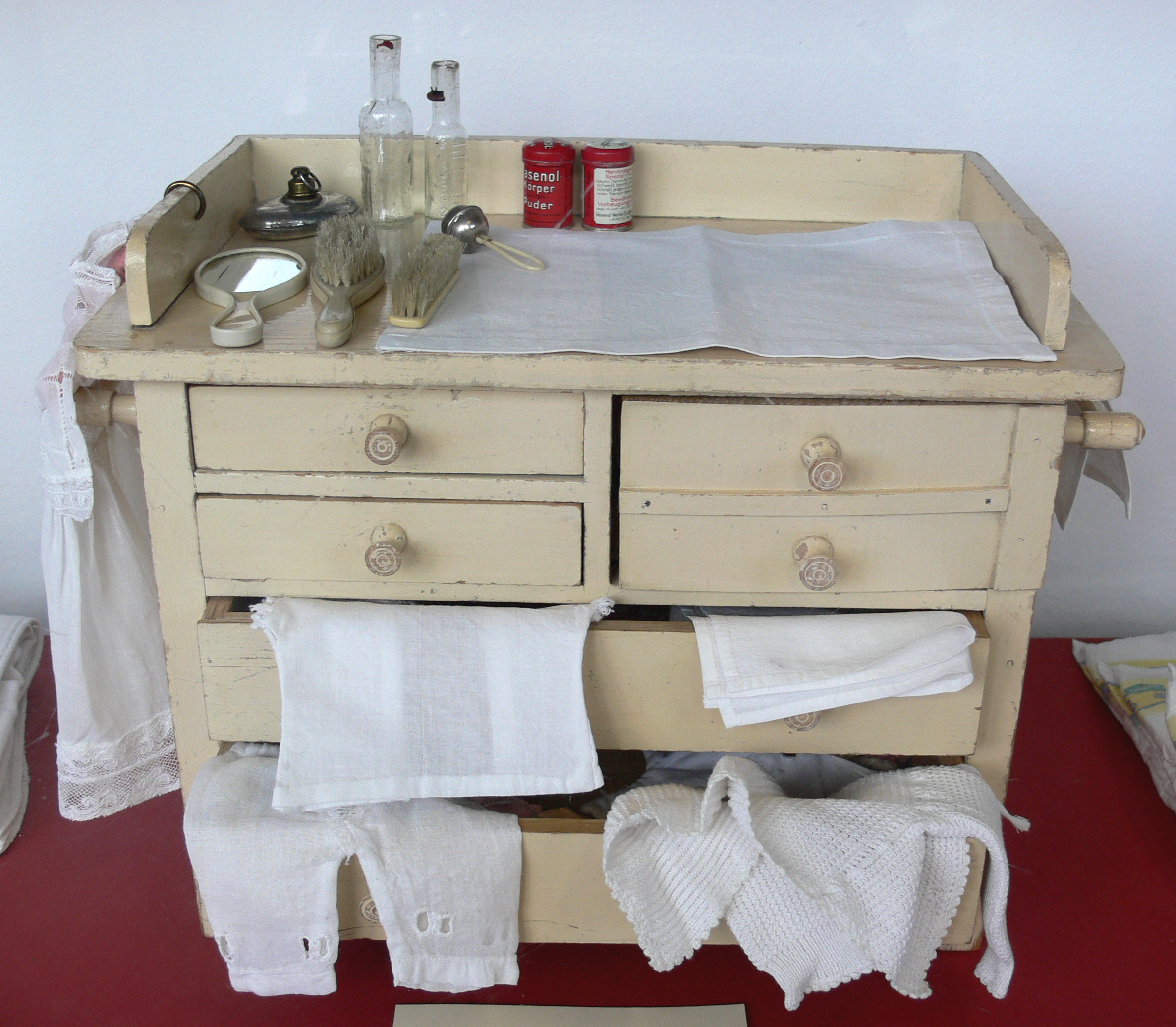
A changing table

Baby furniture refers to furniture created for babies. It is often used to help the parents of the baby keep it safe and comfortable in the home. Before baby furniture, parents would sleep with their children in their own beds, which could be dangerous for the child. Eventually, infant beds started to be built with the child's safety in mind; the intention was to keep the baby from rolling off the bed, so mangers and bassinets were created. Over time, more furniture was created with the infant's safety in mind, and there are several types and functionalities of these. Typical pieces include an infant bed (such as a crib, bassinet, or cradle), changing table, high chair, playpen, baby walker, and toy chest. Products, features, and costs vary between countries and have changed over time. Safety is of paramount importance.A crib, a changing table, and a nursing rocker are the three core pieces of furniture for creating a safe and comfortable nursery.

== Safety and Health Standards for Selection ==
- Eco-friendly Certification: Prioritize furniture with Greenguard Gold certification to ensure low chemical emissions and protect your baby's respiratory health.
- Physical Safety: The spacing between crib slats must be less than 6 cm (approximately the width of a soda can) to prevent the baby's head from getting trapped. The furniture must be structurally stable, and dressers must be equipped with anti-tip kits.

== Safety procedures for changing tables ==
Many authorities state that the best way to prevent a child from falling from a changing table is to modify the table. This includes guardrails that are at least two inches on all sides, concave changing surfaces, and safety straps. Authorities also recommend keeping all necessary supplies within arms reach and to inspect the changing table before placing the child on the table. It is also important for parents to utilize safe procedures, such as proper lifting technique and using height-appropriate changing tables.

== Safety procedures for strollers ==
Strollers (also known as push chairs or buggies) are a mean of transportation for infants up to around the age of 3 or 4. Variants of strollers include twin strollers as well as triple strollers. Strollers come typically with multiple functionalities including an umbrella like roof to prevent a large amount of sun to enter the stroller, the ability to detach the seat and become a car seat, the ability to fold for ease of transportation by car, and more as new designs and features are being created.

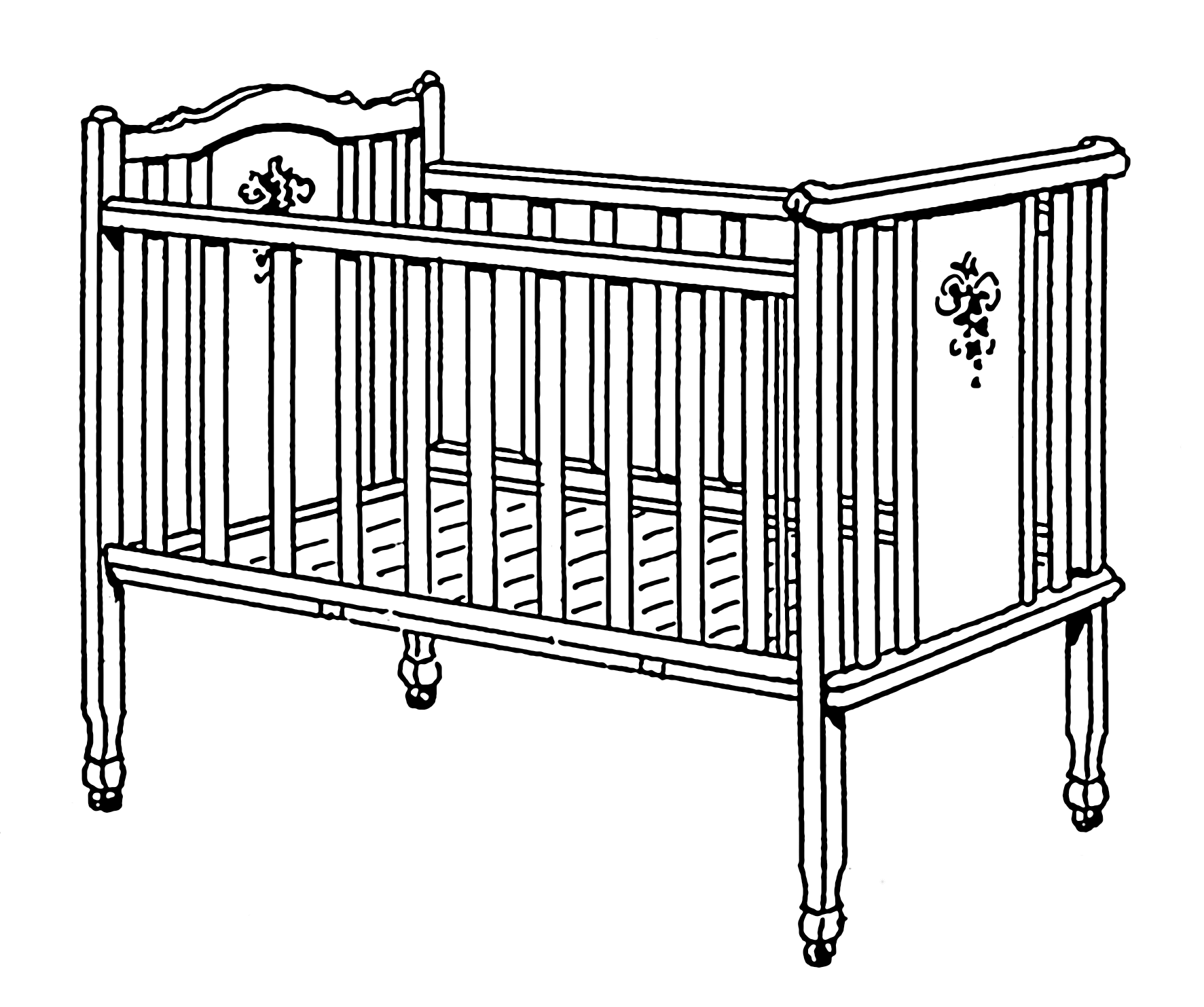
Crib

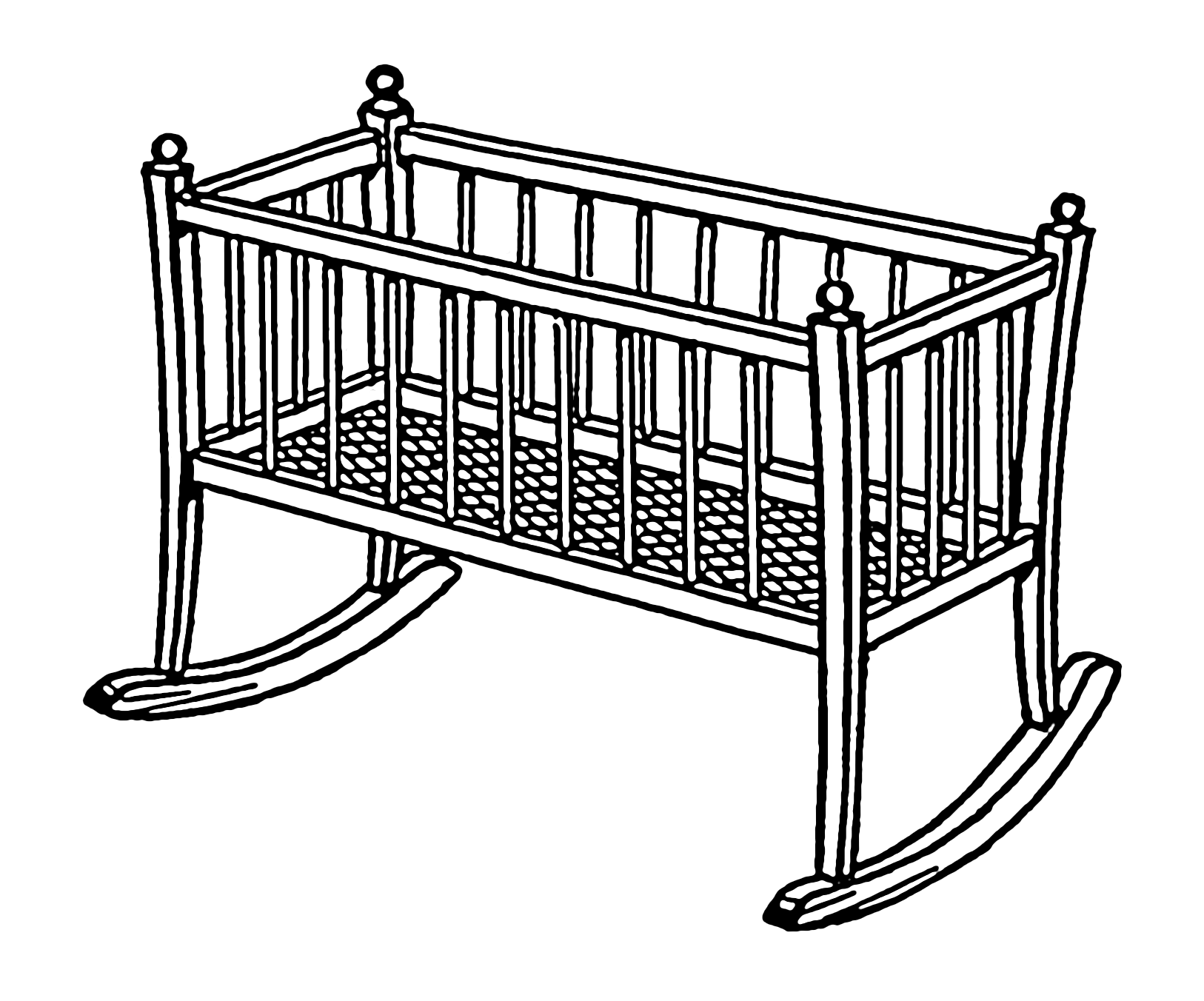
Cradle

== Gallery ==
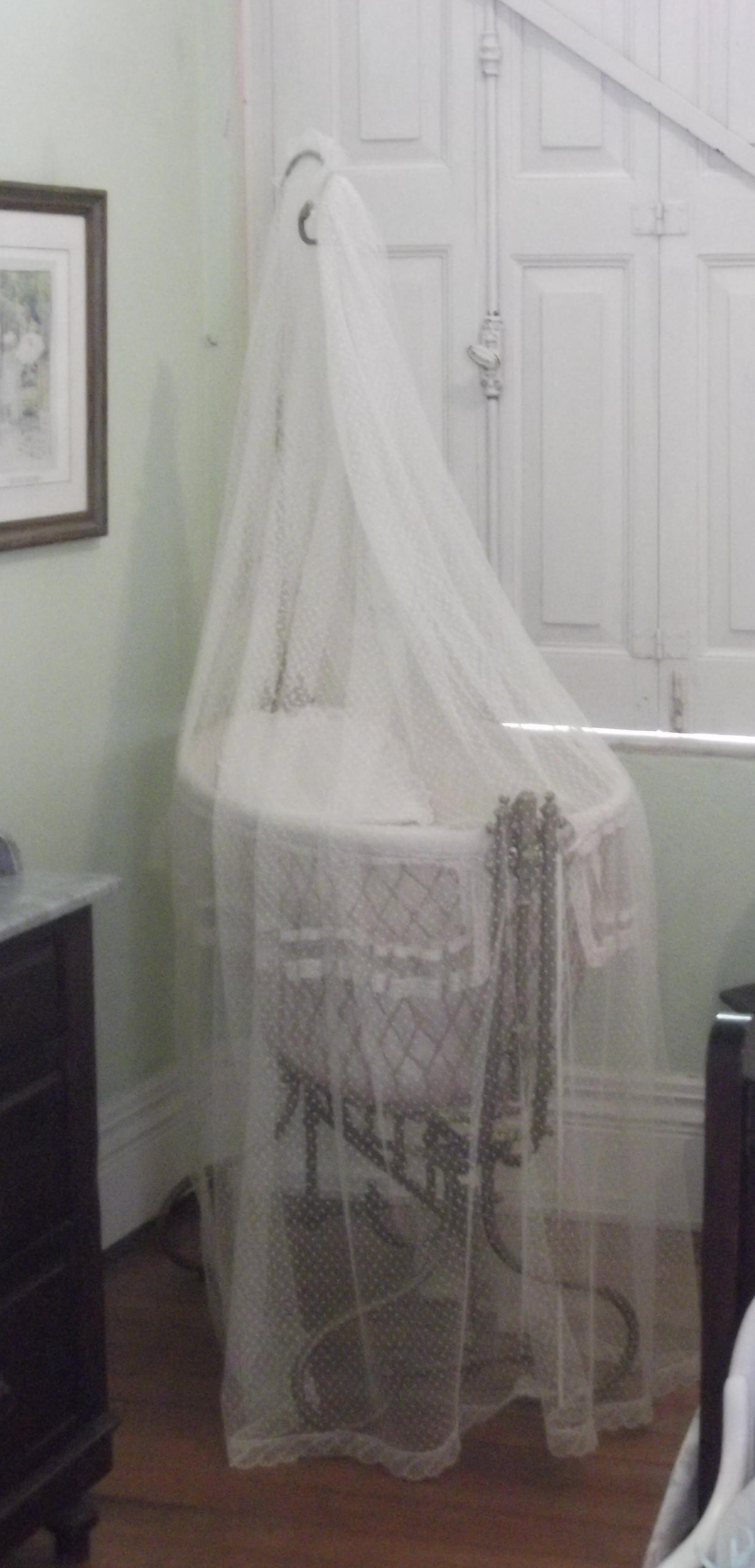
Bassinet with netting

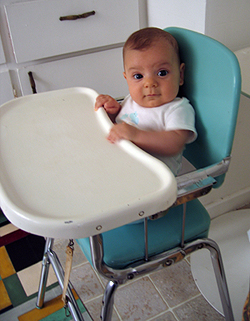
High chair

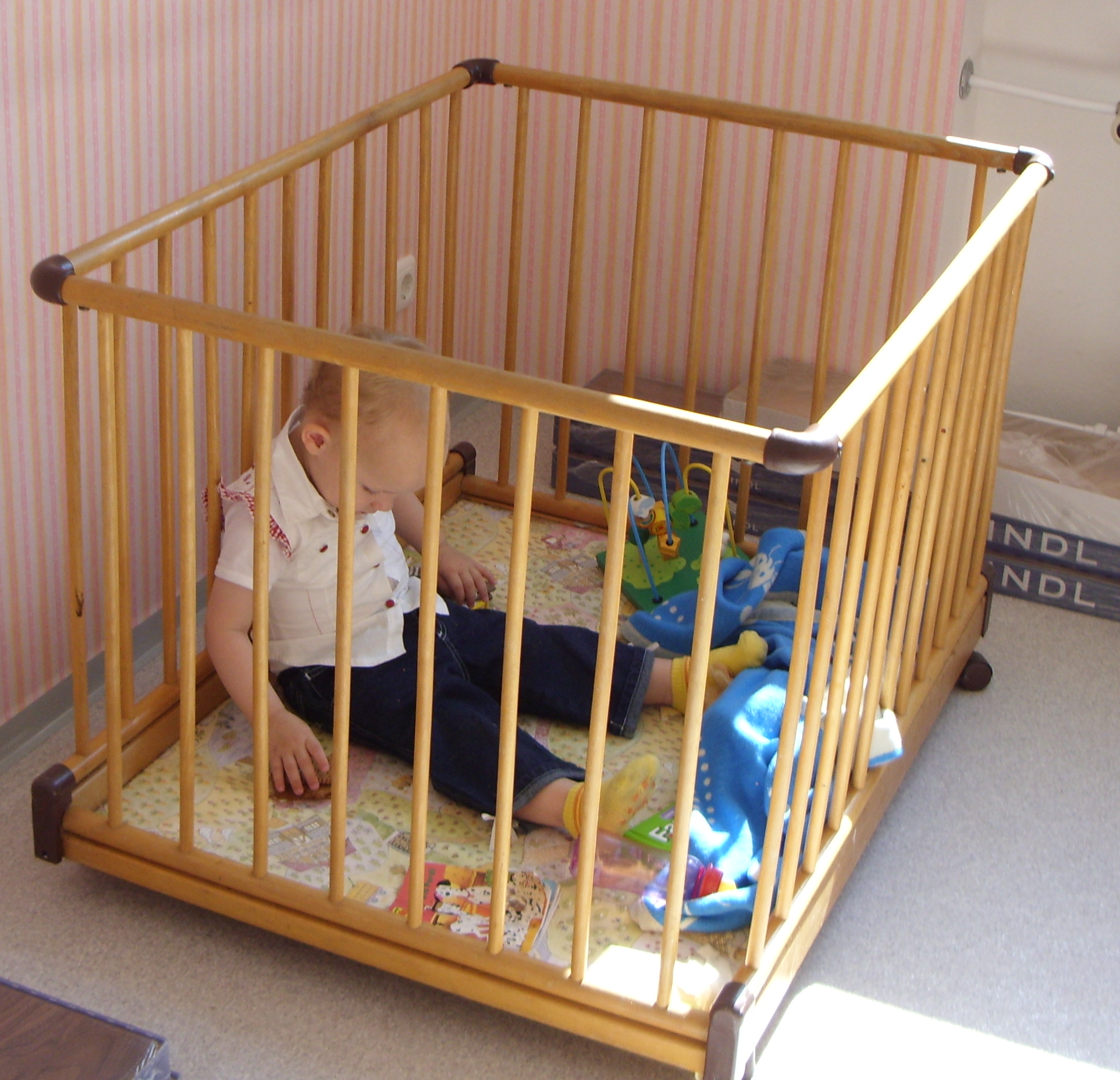
Playpen

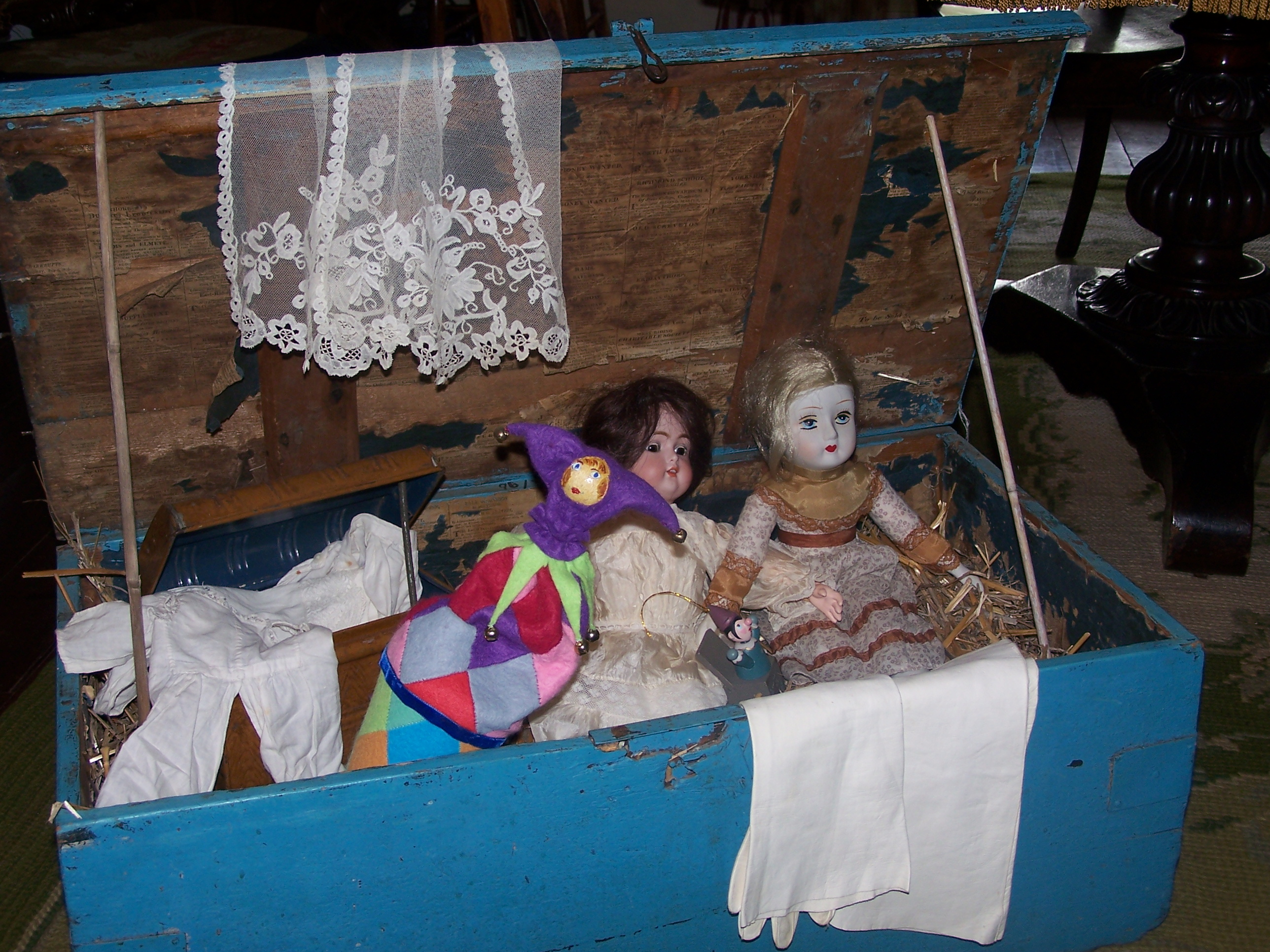
Toy chest

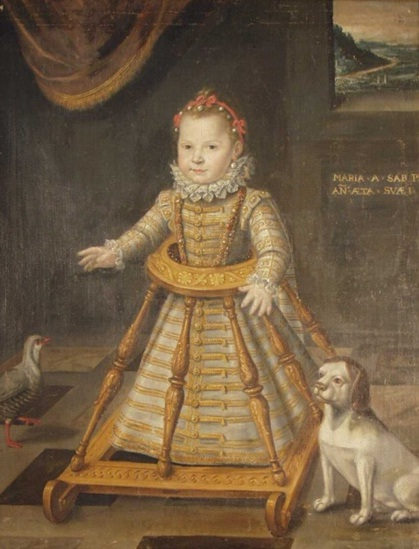
Baby walker
