= Cosperville, Indiana =

- Unincorporated community
- Location within Indiana Location within the United States
- Coordinates: 41°28′51″N 85°28′27″W
- Country: United States
- State: Indiana
- County: Noble
- Township: Elkhart
- Elevation: 902 ft (275 m)
- Time zone: UTC-5 (Eastern (EST))
  - Summer (DST): UTC-4 (EDT)
- ZIP code: 46794
- Area code: 260
- FIPS code: 18-15292
- GNIS feature ID: 433009

Cosperville is an unincorporated community in Elkhart Township, Noble County, in the U.S. state of Indiana.

== History ==
Cosperville was originally known as Springfield, and under the latter name was founded in 1844. A post office was established at Cosperville in 1891, and remained in operation until it was discontinued in 1903.

== Geography ==
Cosperville is located at 41°28′51″N 85°28′27″W.
