= BABIES Act =

The BABIES Act, or Bathrooms Accessible In Every Situation Act, (Pub. L. 114–235 (text) (PDF)) is a United States federal law that was passed by the United States Congress in September 2016 and signed into law by US President Barack Obama on October 7, 2016. The law requires changing tables in all publicly accessible, federal buildings. In particular, the law received attention for requiring such baby-changing accommodations must be available in both male and female restrooms, ending the practice of providing changing tables only in women's restrooms.

== Provisions ==
The BABIES Act requires at least one baby-changing station available on each floor of every publicly accessible federal building. These stations must be installed within 2 years of the law's passage. Baby-changing facilities must be approved by the General Services Administration as safe and sanitary. In addition, restrooms which do not have changing tables (because another is located on the same floor) must have signage indicating the location of the other changing table. The only exceptions provided in the act are: (1) non-public restrooms, (2) restrooms with signage directing users to a changing table on the same floor, (3) buildings which would require new construction that is "unfeasible" in order to install a station, (4) and buildings for which alterations would be prohibited.

== Impact ==
According to the law's sponsors and media reports, there were two main goals for passing the law: providing sanitary and safe conditions for children who would otherwise be changed on countertops, floors, or other locations; and ensuring parity in changing facilities for men and women.
