= Charles McGee (pilot) =

US Air Force officer (1919–2022)

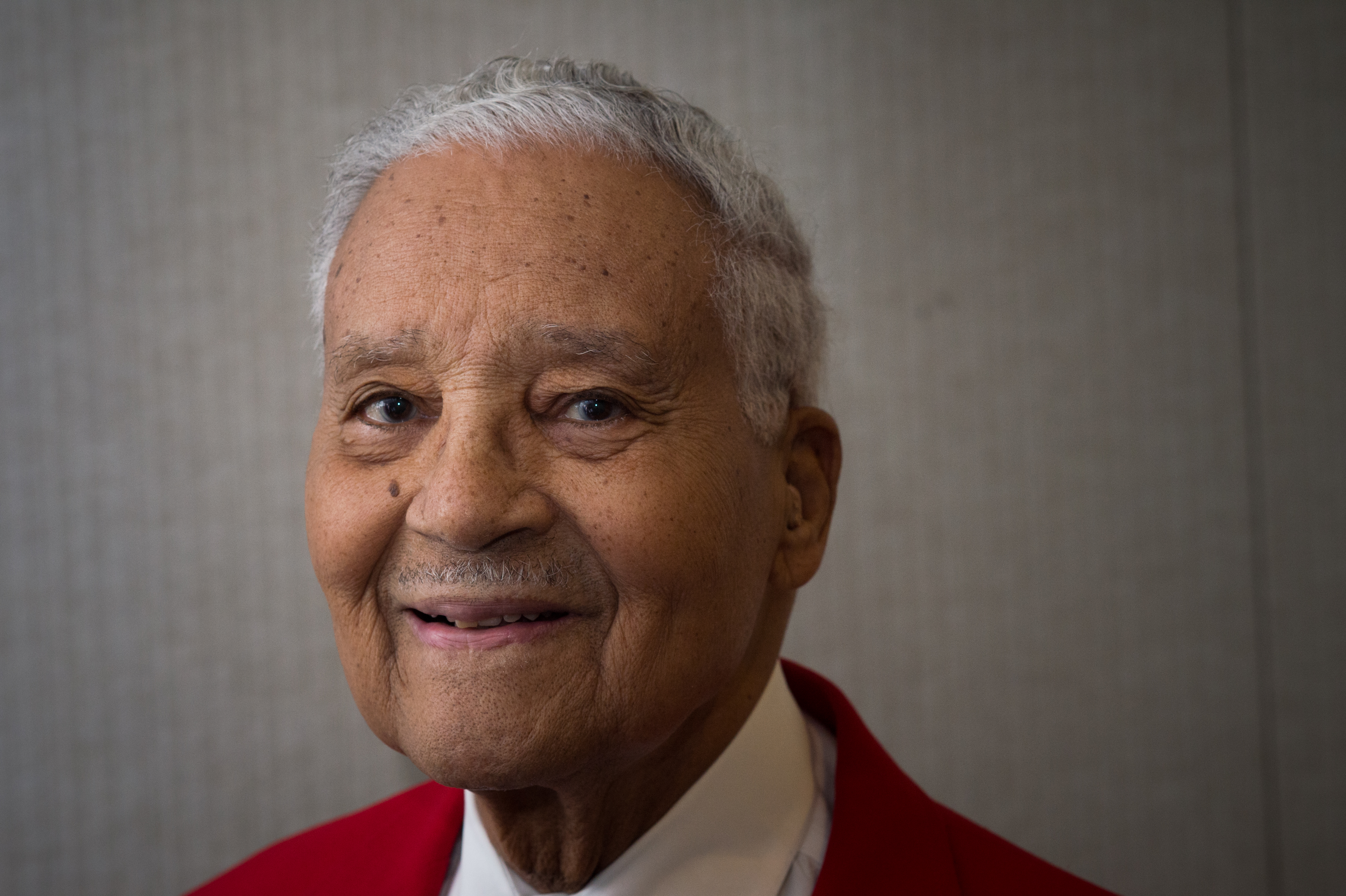
- McGee in 2014
- Born: December 7, 1919; Cleveland, Ohio, U.S.
- Died: January 16, 2022 (aged 102); Bethesda, Maryland, U.S.
- Military career
- Allegiance: United States
- Branch: United States Army Air Forces; United States Air Force
- Service years: 1942–1973
- Rank: Colonel; Brigadier general (promoted 2020)
- Units: 332nd Fighter Group (Tuskegee Airmen)
- Commands: 16th Tactical Reconnaissance Squadron
- Conflicts: World War II; Korean War; Vietnam War
- Awards: Legion of Merit (2); Distinguished Flying Cross (3); Bronze Star Medal; Air Medal (26); Congressional Gold Medal (with all other Tuskegee Airmen)

Brigadier General Charles Edward McGee (December 7, 1919 − January 16, 2022) was an American fighter pilot who was one of the first African American aviators in the United States military and one of the last living members of the Tuskegee Airmen. McGee first began his career in World War II flying with the Tuskegee Airmen, an all African American military pilot group at a time of segregation in the armed forces. His military aviation career lasted 30 years in which McGee flew 409 combat missions in World War II, the Korean War and Vietnam War.

For his service, McGee received the Distinguished Flying Cross with two oak leaf clusters and the Bronze Star Medal, along with many other military honors. In 2007, as a member of the Tuskegee Airmen, McGee received the Congressional Gold Medal. In 2011, he was inducted into the National Aviation Hall of Fame and in February 2020, was promoted from colonel to brigadier general.

== Family and early years ==
Charles McGee was born in Cleveland, Ohio, on December 7, 1919, to Lewis Allen and Ruth Elizabeth (Lewis) McGee. His grandfather was formerly enslaved and his father served as an Army chaplain in World War I and during the Battle of the Bulge in the Second World War. Lewis was also at various times a teacher, social worker, African Methodist Episcopal minister (ultimately a Unitarian minister and one of the first African Americans as such), and later an activist during the civil rights movement of the 1950s and 1960s. The family frequently moved during Charles's childhood. He had two siblings, his older brother Lewis and younger sister Ruth. His mother died shortly after his sister was born.

As a child, McGee was a member of the Boy Scouts of America and earned the Eagle Scout award on August 9, 1940. He later served in district and regional positions in the Boy Scouts. At the 2010 National Scout Jamboree, he was recognized with the Distinguished Eagle Scout Award.

McGee met Salem Baptist Church member Frances Nelson (born 1921) in April 1942. They were married at her home by his father on October 17, 1942. They had three children: Charlene, Ronald, and Yvonne. Two days after their wedding, he was sworn in as an aviation cadet. Frances McGee died February 22, 1994, at the age of 73. They were married for over 51 years.

== Career ==
=== World War II ===
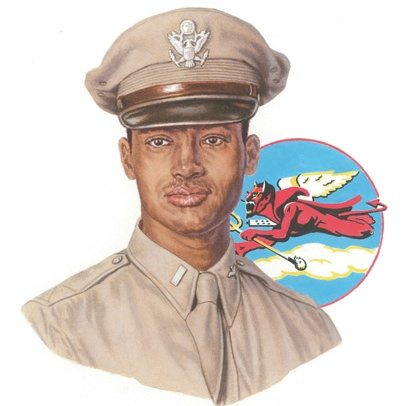
Portrait of a young Lieutenant McGee

In March 1942, McGee was a sophomore at the University of Illinois studying engineering. While a student he was a member of the National Society of Pershing Rifles. He also became a member of the Tau chapter of Alpha Phi Alpha fraternity. Enlisting in the United States Army on October 26, 1942, in time he became part of the Tuskegee Airmen, having already earned his pilot's wings and graduated from Class 43-F on June 30, 1943.

By February 1944, McGee was stationed in Italy with the 302nd Fighter Squadron of the 332d Fighter Group, flying his first mission on Valentine's Day. McGee flew the Bell P-39Q Airacobra, the Republic P-47D Thunderbolt, and the North American P-51 Mustang fighter aircraft, escorting Consolidated B-24 Liberator and Boeing B-17 Flying Fortress bombers over Germany, Austria, and the Balkans. During missions, he sometimes also engaged in low level strafing attacks over enemy airfields and rail yards.

On August 23, 1944, while escorting B-17s over Czechoslovakia, McGee engaged a formation of Luftwaffe fighters and shot down a Focke-Wulf Fw 190.

Now a captain, McGee had flown a total of 137 combat missions and was returned to the United States on December 1, 1944, to become an instructor for the North American B-25 Mitchell bombers flown by the 477th Bomb Group (Medium), another unit of the Tuskegee Airmen. He remained at Tuskegee Army Air Field until 1946, when the base was closed. McGee told the BBC in 2007 that "[Our success] made it possible for President Truman to issue orders mandating all of the service to integrate", referring to Executive Order 9981 that President Harry Truman signed into law in 1948, which ended racial segregation in the United States Armed Forces.

=== Postwar ===
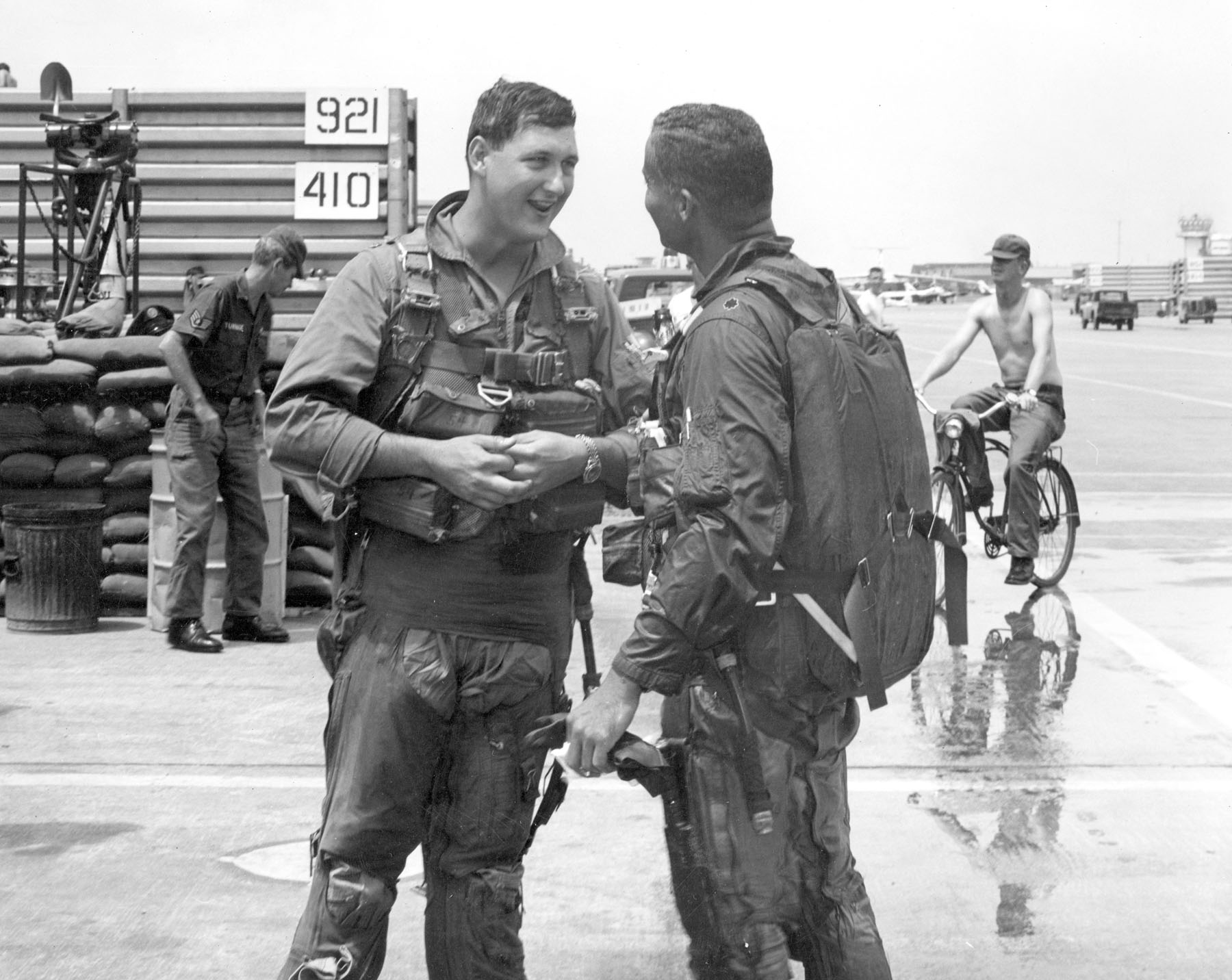
Lieutenant Colonel McGee (right) served as Commander of the 16th Tactical Reconnaissance Squadron in Vietnam; Lieutenant Tom Coney (left) flew as his backseater.

After World War II, McGee was sent to Lockbourne Army Air Field (now Rickenbacker ANGB, Columbus, Ohio) to become the base operations and training officer, later in 1948, being posted to an Aircraft Maintenance Technical Course and was assigned to an air refueling unit. Continuing his service with the United States Air Force as it was reconstituted, McGee continued to serve as a fighter pilot, flying Lockheed F-80 Shooting Star and Northrop F-89 Scorpion aircraft. When the Korean War broke out, he flew P-51 Mustangs again in the 67th Fighter Bomber Squadron, completing 100 missions, and was promoted to major.

During the Vietnam War, as a lieutenant colonel, McGee flew 172 combat missions in a McDonnell RF-4 photo-reconnaissance aircraft. During his Southeast Asia combat tour, McGee served as the Squadron Commander of the 16th Tactical Reconnaissance Squadron (TRS), of the 460th Tactical Reconnaissance Wing, which was based at Tan Son Nhut Air Base, in South Vietnam. The 16th TRS flew the RF-4C "photo-recce" Phantom II jet aircraft.

After a series of other appointments-both in the United States as well as in Italy and West Germany, McGee retired at the rank of colonel, on January 31, 1973. In a 30-year active service career, McGee achieved a three-war fighter mission total of 409 combat missions, one of the highest by any Air Force fighter pilot. He ended his military career with 6,308 flying hours.

=== Post-retirement ===
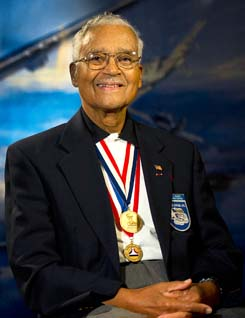
Official USAF portrait of Colonel Charles E. McGee, circa 2011

After his military service, McGee held functional and honorary positions in aviation. In 1978, at the age of 58, he completed his college degree at Columbia College, over thirty years after his initial enrollment at the University of Illinois. Though interrupted by World War II, attaining a college degree had been a lifelong goal.

McGee served as the director of the Kansas City airport and as a member of the Aviation Advisory Commission. For over 30 years, he had been an ambassador of Tuskegee Airmen, Inc. (or Tuskegee Airmen Association), established in 1972. He served as national president of the association from 1983 to 1985 and was instrumental to its growth, leading efforts to provide aviation career opportunities for people of color. He gave numerous public addresses and received several accolades including the National Aeronautic Association's "Elder Statesman of Aviation". He also participated in the Air Force Association.

In 2005, McGee intended to be part of a group of former Tuskegee Airmen, who flew to Balad, Iraq, to speak to active duty airmen serving in the 332nd Air Expeditionary Wing, the current incarnation of the 332nd Fighter Group. However, McGee was not noted as being in Balad.

In 2007, McGee appeared in an episode of Dogfights on the History Channel, alongside fellow Tuskegee Airmen Lee Archer and Roscoe Brown. McGee also served as a consultant to the 2012 George Lucas film, Red Tails.

== Later life and death ==
For his lifelong dedication to aviation, in 2011, McGee was inducted into the National Aviation Hall of Fame.

In 2018, to celebrate McGee's 99th birthday, businessman and former Air Force pilot Glenn Gonzales took McGee for a flight in a HondaJet, allowing McGee to take the controls of an airplane in flight for the first time in 37 years. In April 2019, McGee was honored at the King Arts Complex in Columbus, Ohio.

In December 2019, for his 100th birthday, McGee flew with a copilot in a Cirrus Vision Jet and a Cessna Citation M2. The Cirrus flight took him to Dover Air Force Base, where he was welcomed by the base commander and many airmen, anxious to meet the Tuskegee Airman who helped break down barriers for them. He was feted at a lunch hosted at the AOPA National Aviation Community Center where he received awards and accolades from the FAA, the US Senate, the State of Maryland, the city of Frederick, Maryland, and numerous dignitaries. Those who flew with the colonel remarked that he handled the airplanes well and with little assistance.

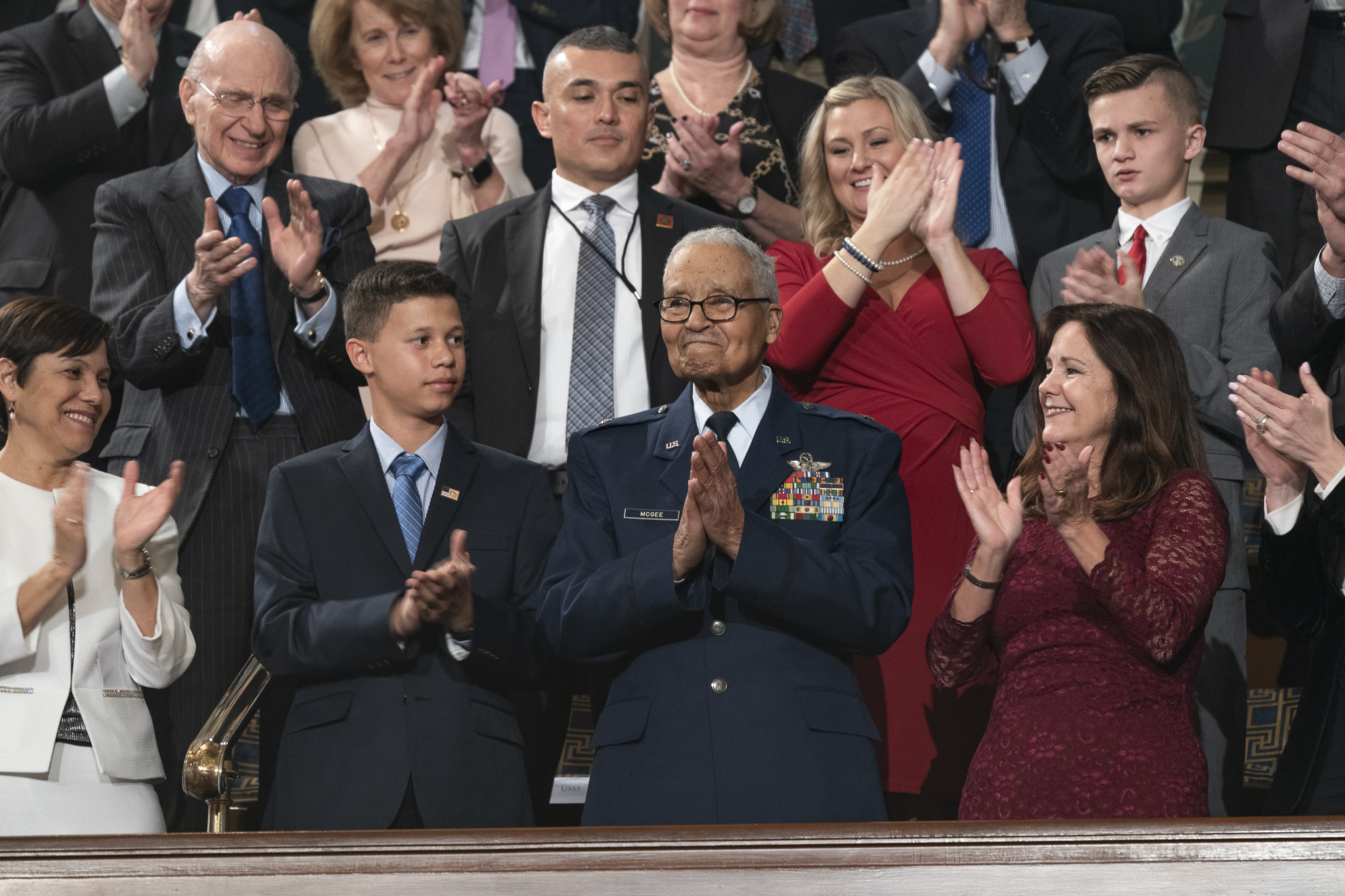
McGee honored at the 2020 State of the Union Address, with his great-grandson Iain Lanphier to the left and Second Lady Karen Pence to the right

On February 2, 2020, McGee presented the coin for the coin flip at Super Bowl LIV, alongside three other fellow centenarian World War II veterans. Two days later, he was honored by President Trump in-person at the 2020 State of the Union Address with a promotion to brigadier general.

Also in 2020, McGee appeared in a promotional video for NASA encouraging young people to become astronauts and enroll in the Artemis program.

McGee died in his sleep on January 16, 2022, at the age of 102, at his home in Bethesda, Maryland. He was one of the last surviving Tuskegee Airmen. Vice President Kamala Harris, Secretary of Defense Lloyd Austin, New York City Mayor Eric Adams, and Secretary of the United States Air Force General Charles Q. Brown all offered statements in response to his death. He was buried in Section 3 at Arlington National Cemetery on June 17, 2022.

== Honors ==
McGee was recognized for his combat and military service with a number of military decorations, including: Legion of Merit with oak leaf cluster, Distinguished Flying Cross with two oak leaf clusters, Bronze Star Medal, Air Medal with 25 oak leaf clusters, Air Force Commendation Medal with oak leaf cluster, Army Commendation Medal, Presidential Unit Citation, Korean Presidential Unit Citation, Hellenic Republic World War II Commemorative Medal, along with many related campaign and service ribbons.

USAF Command Pilot Badge
Legion of Merit with bronze oak leaf cluster		Distinguished Flying Cross with two bronze oak leaf clusters
Bronze Star Medal	Air Medal with four silver oak leaf clusters	Air Medal with four bronze oak leaf clusters (second ribbon required for accoutrement spacing)
Air Force Commendation Medal with bronze oak leaf cluster	Army Commendation Medal	Air Force Presidential Unit Citation with bronze oak leaf cluster
Air Force Outstanding Unit Award with bronze oak leaf cluster	American Campaign Medal	European–African–Middle Eastern Campaign Medal with three bronze campaign stars
World War II Victory Medal	National Defense Service Medal with service star	Korean Service Medal with four bronze campaign stars
Vietnam Service Medal with bronze campaign star	Air Force Longevity Service Award with silver oak leaf cluster	Armed Forces Reserve Medal
Small Arms Expert Marksmanship Ribbon	Republic of Korea Presidential Unit Citation	United Nations Service Medal for Korea
Hellenic Republic World War II Commemorative Medal	Vietnam Campaign Medal	Korean War Service Medal

On March 29, 2007, at a ceremony inside the Rotunda of the U.S. Capitol, President George W. Bush and the U.S. Congress collectively awarded the Congressional Gold Medal, the nation's highest civilian award, to McGee and all other surviving and deceased Tuskegee Airmen.

In 2011, McGee was inducted into the National Aviation Hall of Fame in Dayton, Ohio.

On February 4, 2020, McGee was promoted from colonel to brigadier general. It was authorized in legislation introduced in December 2019 shortly after his 100th birthday, by Maryland Senator Chris Van Hollen and Representative Anthony Brown. McGee was a special guest at the 2020 State of the Union Address, where President Donald Trump pinned the stars to his uniform in the Oval Office before delivering the address that day.

After McGee's death in 2022, the Silver Spring Library in Montgomery County, Maryland was renamed in his honor.

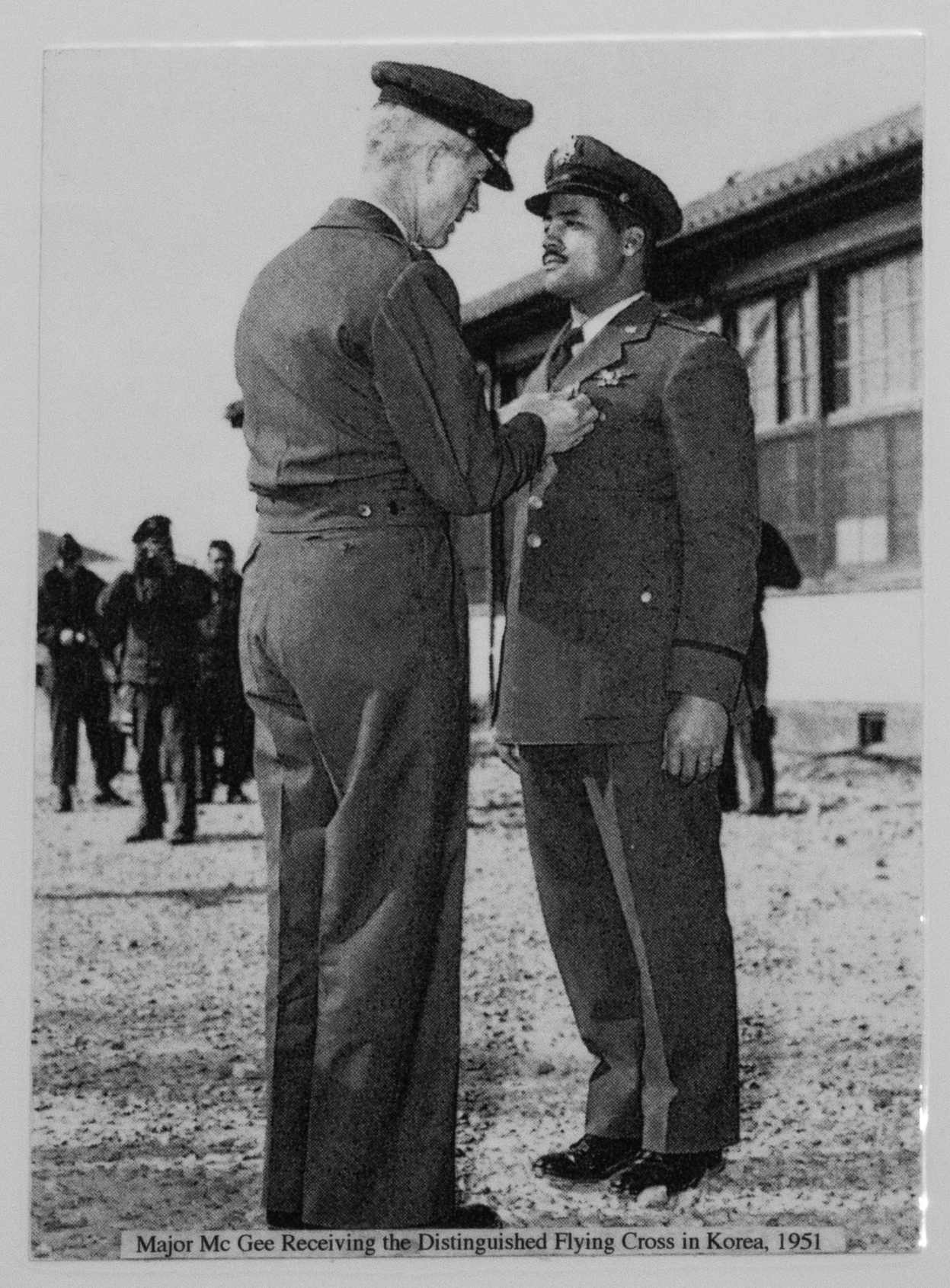
USAF photo of Major McGee receiving the Distinguished Flying Cross in Korea in 1951

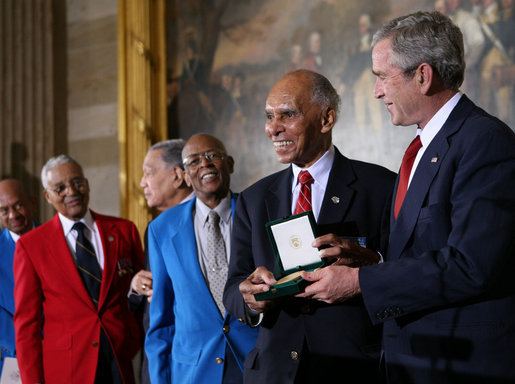
McGee, second from left, receiving the Congressional Gold Medal with other Tuskegee Airmen in 2007

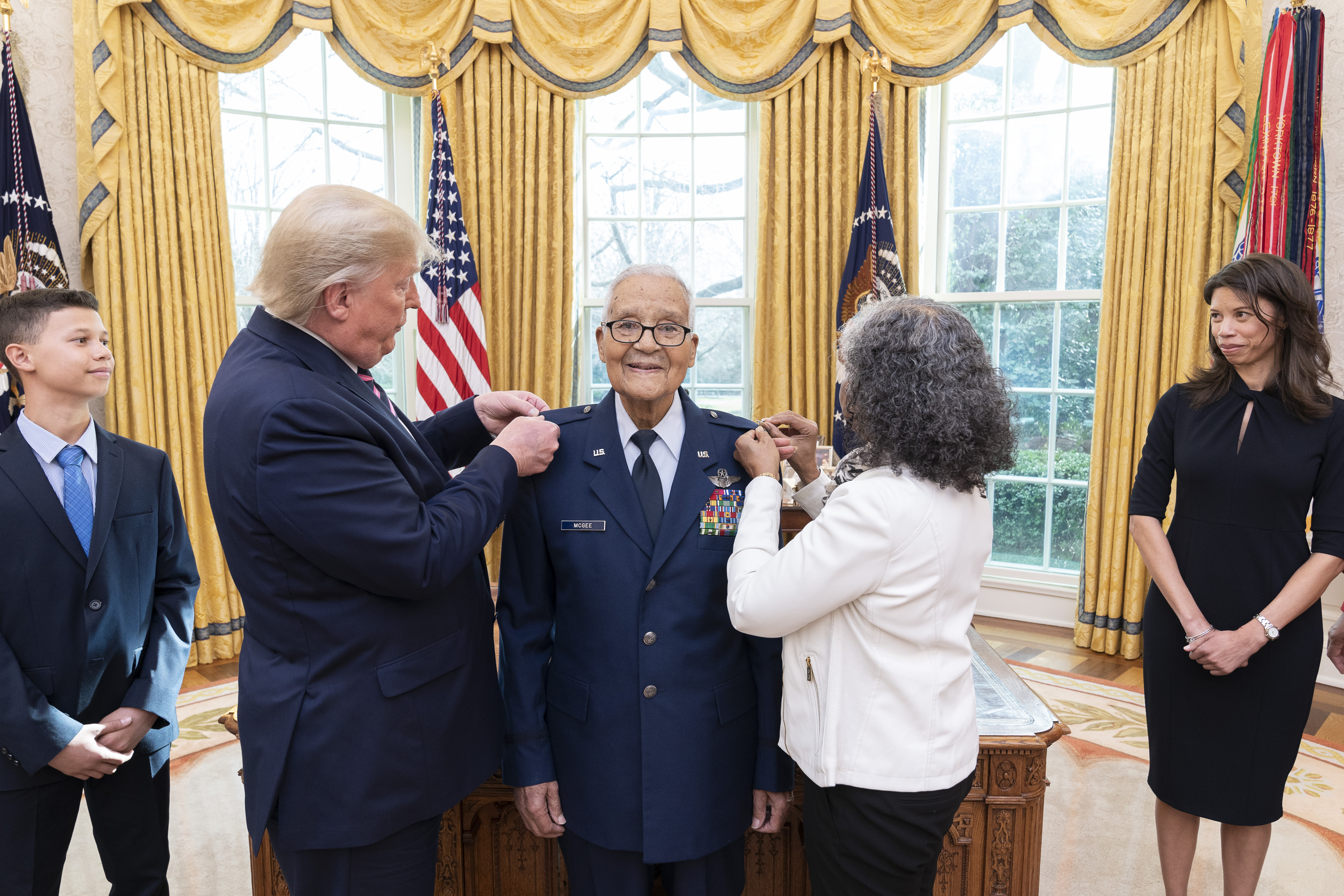
McGee being promoted to brigadier general on February 4, 2020

== Personal life ==
McGee married his wife, Frances Nelson, in 1942. The two remained married for over 50 years until Frances' death in 1994. At the time of Charles' death, he and Frances McGee had 3 children, 10 grandchildren, 14 great-grandchildren, and 1 great-great-granddaughter.

McGee named his P-51 Kitten after Frances, who worked as a medical secretary in the John A. Andrew Memorial Hospital through the Tuskegee Institute while Charles was training there. McGee's P-51C Kitten camouflage is available as a playable vehicle in the video game, War Thunder. McGee was a Christian and very active in his local church.

== See also ==
- Brigadier General Charles E. McGee Library
- Fly (2009 play)
- Freeman Field Mutiny
- List of Tuskegee Airmen
- Military history of African Americans
- The Tuskegee Airmen (1995 film)
