= Marcella Walker McGee =

Librarian and activist

- Born: July 23, 1904; Chicago, Illinois, United States
- Died: May 28, 1997 (aged 92); Kensington, Maryland, United States
- Education: University of Chicago; Northwestern University
- Occupations: Librarian and activist
- Movement: Civil Rights Movement
- Spouses: Dr Ernest J. Ricks (div.); Lewis Allen McGee (1945–1979) (dec.)
- Children: 1

Marcella Walker McGee (July 23, 1904 – May 28, 1997) was an American librarian and social and community activist. Together with her husband Lewis Allen McGee, McGee helped found one of the first interracial Unitarian churches in the United States.

== Early life and education ==
The daughter of a prosperous African-American family, McGee graduated from the University of Chicago High School and planned to enter Mount Holyoke College. Instead, her family's financial downturn necessitated her taking two years of college courses at University of Chicago and Northwestern University and becoming a librarian. McGee worked as a librarian in Chicago, Illinois for 32 years and then worked for libraries at Antioch College, Humboldt College and in Pasadena, California.

== Social and community activism and religious life ==
McGee's life was devoted to racial equality and social justice. She met Reverend Lewis Allen McGee at the Abraham Lincoln School for Social Science, which taught African-American workers about politics, economics, democracy, and citizenship. After marrying him in 1945, McGee worked with her husband to found the interracial but predominantly African-American Free Religious Fellowship (FRF) on South Side, Chicago. In 1960, she was elected to the joint Alliance of Unitarian Women and Association of Universalist Women and was involved in the reorganization that united the two into the Unitarian Universalist Women's Federation. McGee chaired the Federation's first continent-wide Leadership Conference.

== Later years and death ==
McGee survived her husband Lewis Allen McGee and did not remarry. In 1994, she was honored with the Clara Barton Award, which is the highest award the American Red Cross bestows on volunteers. It recognizes meritorious service in volunteer leadership positions held over a period of years. McGee died at the Manor Care Nursing Facility in Kensington, Maryland in 1997, aged 92.
