= Montgomery County Public Libraries =

Public library system for Montgomery County, Maryland, United States

- Location: Montgomery County, Maryland, U.S.
- Established: May 31, 1950; 76 years ago
- Branches: 21

Collection
- Size: 1,904,442 concrete objects

Access and use
- Population served: 1,044,292

Other information
- Budget: US$54,948,439
- Director: Darcell Graham
- Website: montgomerycountymd.gov/library

The Montgomery County Public Libraries (MCPL) is the public library system for residents of Montgomery County, Maryland. The system includes 21 publicly accessible branches as well as a branch in the Montgomery County Correctional Facility.

== History ==
Library service in Montgomery County started in 1869 when a group of residents of Rockville and other areas assembled in the County Courthouse to plan a joint stock library. Other independent libraries were formed in Montgomery County in the following years. For example, in 1893, Brainard Warner and other private citizens established the Noyes Library in Kensington. From 1893 until 1950, independent public or subscriber-funded libraries provided limited services to residents of southern Montgomery County. Nine independent library associations operated facilities in Bethesda, Four Corners, Gaithersburg, Garrett Park, Kensington, Rockville, Sherwood, Silver Spring, and Wheaton.

In 1945, the Maryland legislature passed the State Library Law, which provided matching state funds for county library systems, based on a county's population. On May 31, 1950, the Montgomery County Council passed the County Library Law of 1950, which created a Department of Public Libraries administered by a professional librarian and advised by a Library Board. George B. Moreland was hired as the first Director of the Library System. The Library Board was appointed by the County Council and assumed its duties in February 1951.

By July 1, 1951, when the Department officially began its operations, seven of the nine independent Montgomery County libraries agreed to hand over administrative control to the new system in exchange for improved library service. Remaining independent meant that a library would have to operate from individual subscriptions, donations and fundraising, whereas joining the county system meant that it would receive county funds. The Library System began operation with properties and administrative control of seven formerly independent libraries, including Four Corners, Gaithersburg, Garrett Park, Noyes, Sherwood, Silver Spring, and Wheaton. The Bethesda Library Association transferred its facility and collections to the County on July 1, 1952, but the Rockville Library Association did not follow suit until July 1, 1957.

Today, Montgomery County Public Libraries (MCPL) consists of 21 publicly accessible branches and a branch in the Montgomery County Correctional Facility.

== Governance ==
MCPL is a Montgomery County government agency. The Director of Montgomery County Public Libraries is Darcell Graham.

The Public Libraries' operating budget is included in the County budget process. The approved operating budget for fiscal year 2026 (July 2025–June 2026) is US$54,948,439. This includes money for physical and electronic collections and databases, staff, and programs. Public Libraries employees are County employees. For Fiscal Year 2026, the approved budget included 255 full-time and 173 part-time positions. Non-supervisory staff are represented by UFCW Local 1994 MCGEO.

In 2016, the MCPL released a strategic plan for Fiscal Years 2017-2020, which includes four core aspects:

- Literate Montgomery: Emphasizing aspects of literacy for children and adults, Early Literacy, English Language Literacy, Health Literacy, Digital Literacy, Financial Literacy and Environmental Literacy.
- Connected Montgomery: Emphasizing diversity in programs and services, reaching customers, increasing civic engagement, and providing collaborative spaces.
- Strong and Vibrant Montgomery: Emphasizing job and workforce readiness and support for small businesses
- Delighted Montgomery: Emphasizing improvements to spaces, a focus on customer service and programs, relevant technologies and partnerships, and supporting staff recognition and development. An updated strategic plan was released in 2023

The Public Libraries has a Library Board made up of 12 members appointed by the County Executive, one representing the School Board, and one representing Montgomery College. The Board makes recommendations to the County Executive on library-related issues, including facilities, collection, service areas, and personnel. The Library Board has 23 Library Advisory Committees, subcommittees representing individual branches or programs. Members of the LACs are approved by the Board.

== Branches ==
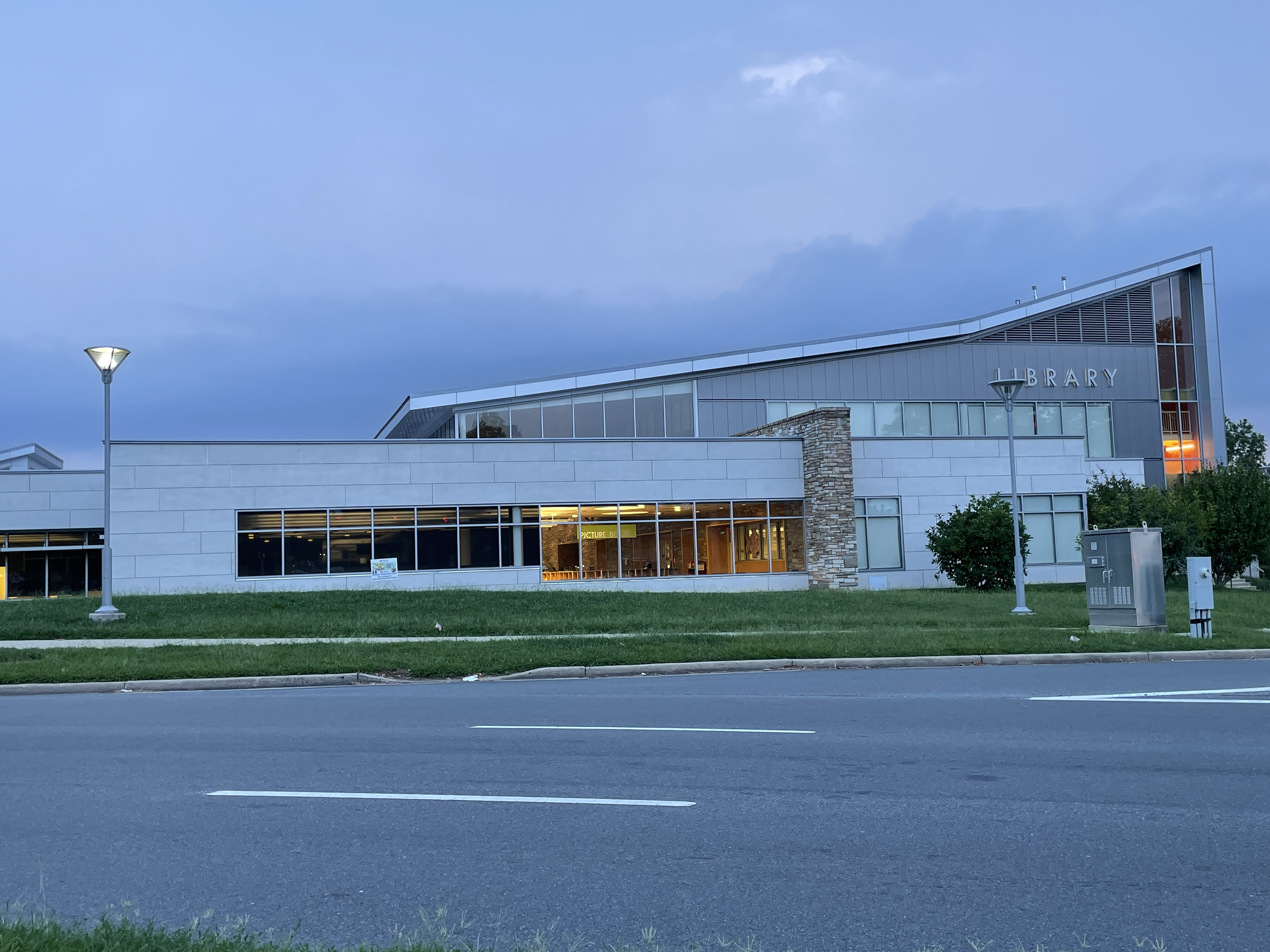
Gaithersburg Library

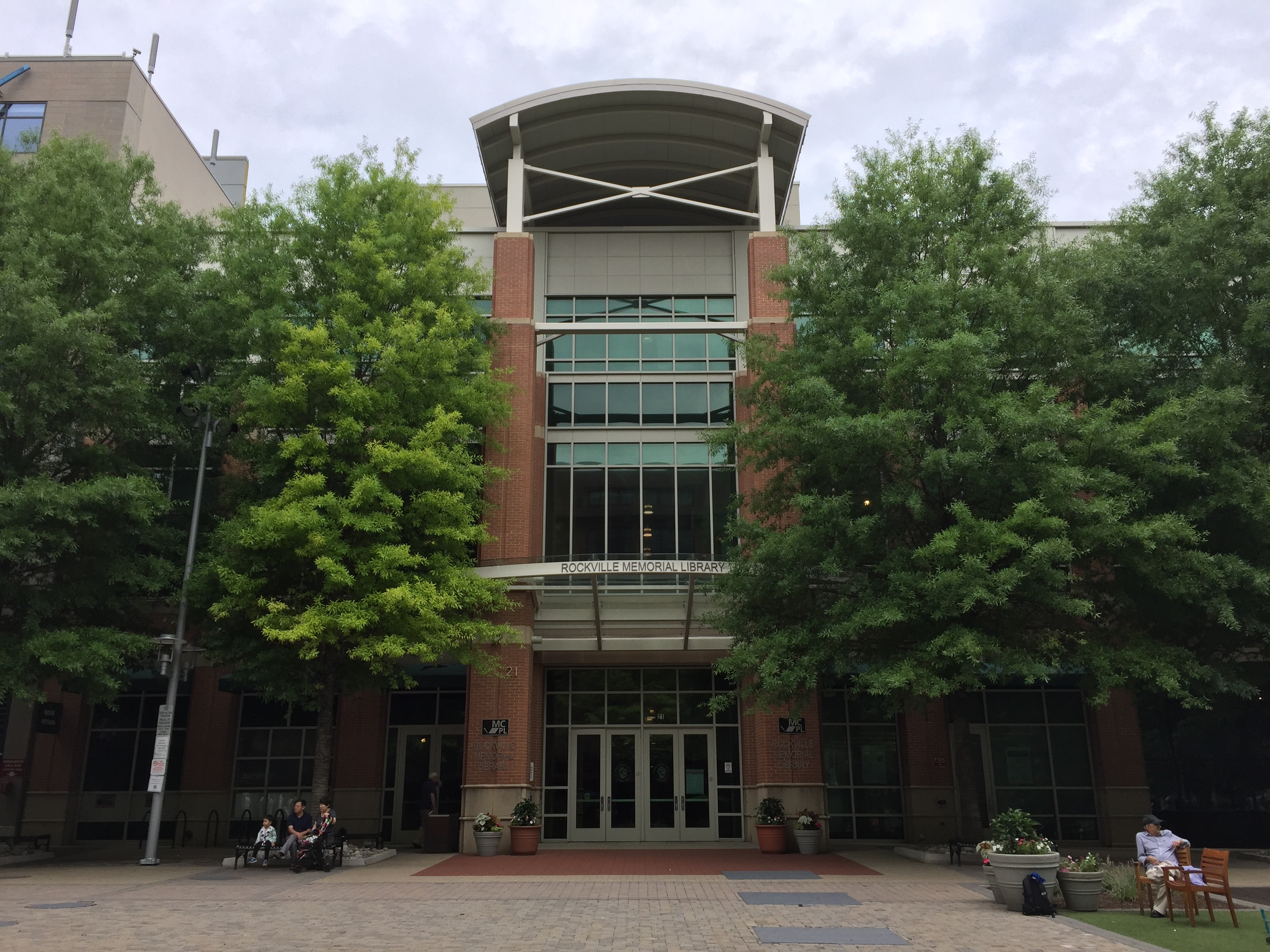
Rockville Memorial Library

Noyes Library for Young Children, Kensington

The following MCPL branches are public:

- Aspen Hill Library
- Brigadier General Charles E. McGee Library (formerly Silver Spring)
- Chevy Chase Library
- Connie Morella Library (formerly Bethesda)
- Damascus Library
- Davis Library (North Bethesda)
- Gaithersburg Library
- Germantown Library
- Kensington Park Library
- Little Falls Library (Bethesda)
- Long Branch Library (Silver Spring/Takoma Park)
- Maggie Nightingale Library (formerly Poolesville)
- Marilyn J. Praisner Library (formerly Fairland)
- Noyes Library for Young Children (Kensington)
- Olney Library
- Potomac Library
- Quince Orchard Library
- Rockville Memorial Library
- Twinbrook Library
- Wheaton Library (located in the Wheaton Library and Community Recreation Center)
- White Oak Library

MCPL operates a Capital Improvement Program that calls for branches to be updated on an accelerated timetable through refresh projects. Two to three libraries per year are closed for several months to complete these projects. The Refresh program allows for technological and other updates on an accelerated timetable from the previous 25 year renovation cycle. The refresh program was recognized with the 2016 Top Innovator Award from the Urban Libraries Council.

== Services ==
MCPL has physical and electronic book checkouts, magazines and e-magazines, audiobooks in various formats, and access to movie and television shows. Internet computer access and Wi-Fi connection are also present. Some branches have specialized graphic design software, and the libraries allow for printing and copying. MCPL also offers online information through its Ask a Librarian and What Do I Check Out Next sites.

In addition, MCPL offers community programs, covering topics such as storytimes and STEAM (Science, Technology, Engineering, Arts, and Math) skills programs for children; coding, writing, and financial literacy programs for teens; book discussion groups and job searching programs for adults; and health, art and financial planning programs for seniors.

MCPL also offers an Outreach Team that visits community events to share information about services and performs library card signups.

== Privileges ==
The library system at MCPL is part of the Maryland Consolidated Library System, which states that any person who is a resident of the State of Maryland may obtain a library card at no charge at any county library or Baltimore City. Non-residents who work for an employer in Maryland or pay property taxes there are also included. Through this rule, it is possible to apply for a card from any library system in the state, or choose to authorize a card from any other library system in the state on that system.

Anyone who lives, works, pays property taxes, or goes to school in Maryland, or who lives in the District of Columbia, or in Alexandria, Arlington, Falls Church, Fairfax, Loudoun, or Prince William Counties in Northern Virginia can regardless of age, can get an MCPL card. The MCPL card allows holders to access the services of a MCPL branch. A digital equivalent can be used to access eBooks and some databases and other eResources.

Proof of address and a photo ID is necessary to apply for a MCPL card. For full library privileges, including checking out and placing holds on physical materials, it is necessary to register in-person. Nonresidents can receive a MCPL Nonresident card, which has a fee of $10.00 a year and is non-refundable.

== Nearby public library systems ==
- Alexandria Public Library
- Arlington Public Library
- District of Columbia Public Library
- Howard County Public Library
- Fairfax County Public Library
- Prince George's County Memorial Library System

== See also ==
- Culture of Maryland
