= Elkhart Township, Noble County, Indiana =

Elkhart Township
- Township
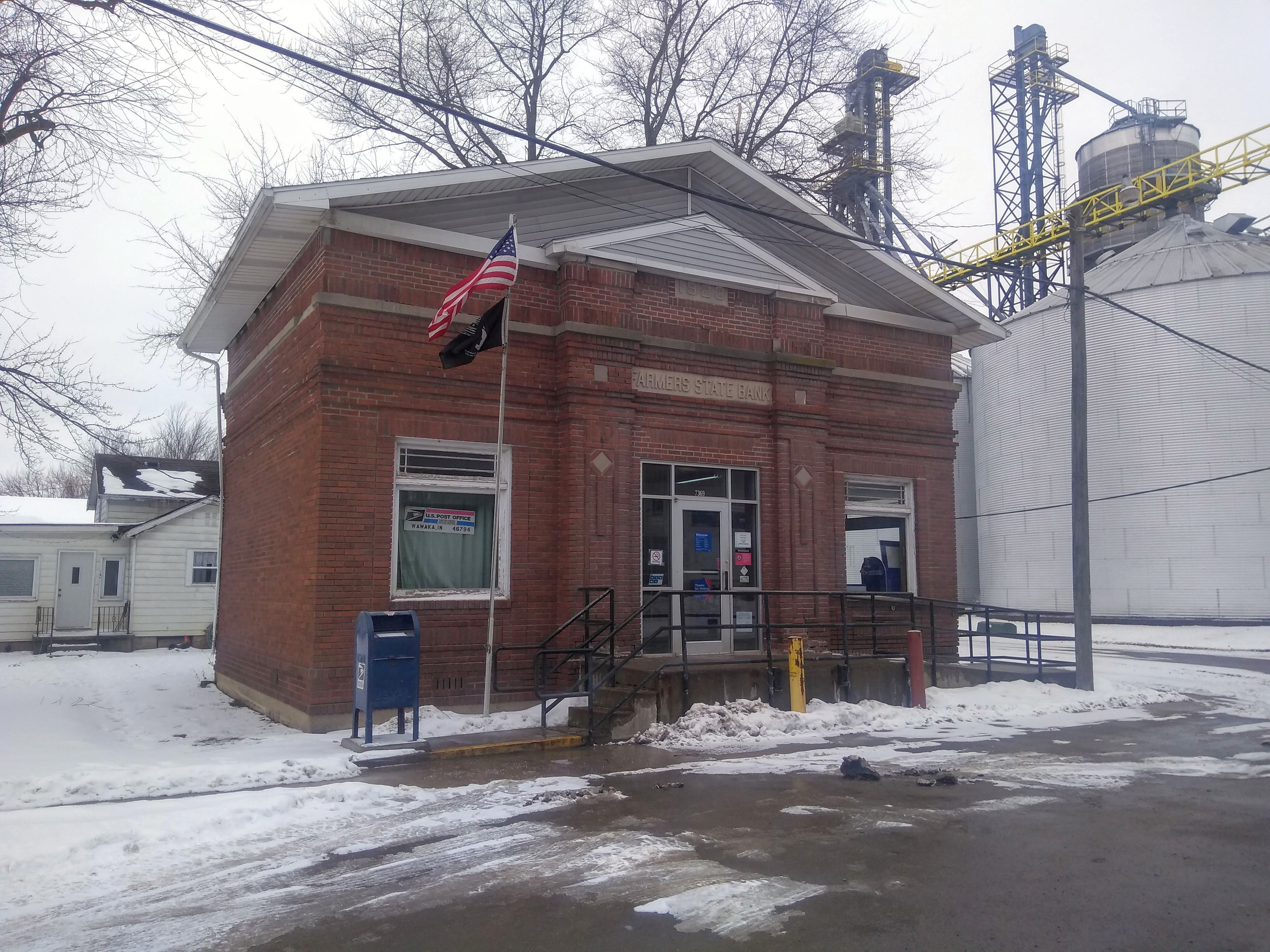
- Post office of Wawaka

- Location in Noble County
- Coordinates: 41°28′53″N 85°28′43″W
- Country: United States
- State: Indiana
- County: Noble

Government
  - Type: Indiana township

Area
  - Total: 35.9 sq mi (93 km^{2})
  - Land: 35.38 sq mi (91.6 km^{2})
  - Water: 0.52 sq mi (1.3 km^{2}) 1.45%
- Elevation: 899 ft (274 m)

Population (2020)
  - Total: 2,062
  - Density: 58.4/sq mi (22.5/km^{2})
- Time zone: UTC-5 (Eastern (EST))
  - Summer (DST): UTC-4 (EDT)
- ZIP codes: 46571, 46767, 46784, 46794
- Area code: 260
- GNIS feature ID: 453276

Historical population
Census	Pop.	Note	%±
1940	1,127		—
1950	1,065		−5.5%
1960	1,159		8.8%
1970	1,245		7.4%
1980	1,501		20.6%
1990	1,545		2.9%
2000	1,910		23.6%
2010	2,065		8.1%
2020	2,062		−0.1%
US Census:

Elkhart Township is one of thirteen townships in Noble County, Indiana, United States. As of the 2020 census, its population was 2,062 (a tiny decrease of 2,065 from 2010) and it contained 742 housing units.

== Geography ==
According to the 2010 census, the township has a total area of 35.9 square miles (93 km^{2}), of which 35.38 square miles (91.6 km^{2}) (or 98.55%) is land and 0.52 square miles (1.3 km^{2}) (or 1.45%) is water.

=== Unincorporated towns ===
- Cosperville at 41.480883°N 85.474148°W
- Wawaka at 41.456994°N 85.482204°W

=== Cemeteries ===
The township contains 3 cemeteries Lower (Lauer), Cosperville, & Rice (Brothwell) Cemeteries. The township contains Cosperville Cemetery. The township contains Rice/Brothwell Cemetery.

=== Major highways ===
- U.S. Route 6
- Indiana State Road 9

=== Lakes ===
- Mirror Lake
- a portion of Diamond lake

== School districts ==
- West Noble School Corporation

== Political districts ==
- Indiana's 3rd congressional district
- State House District 52
- State Senate District 13
