= Lewis Allen McGee =

Unitarian minister and activist (1893–1979)

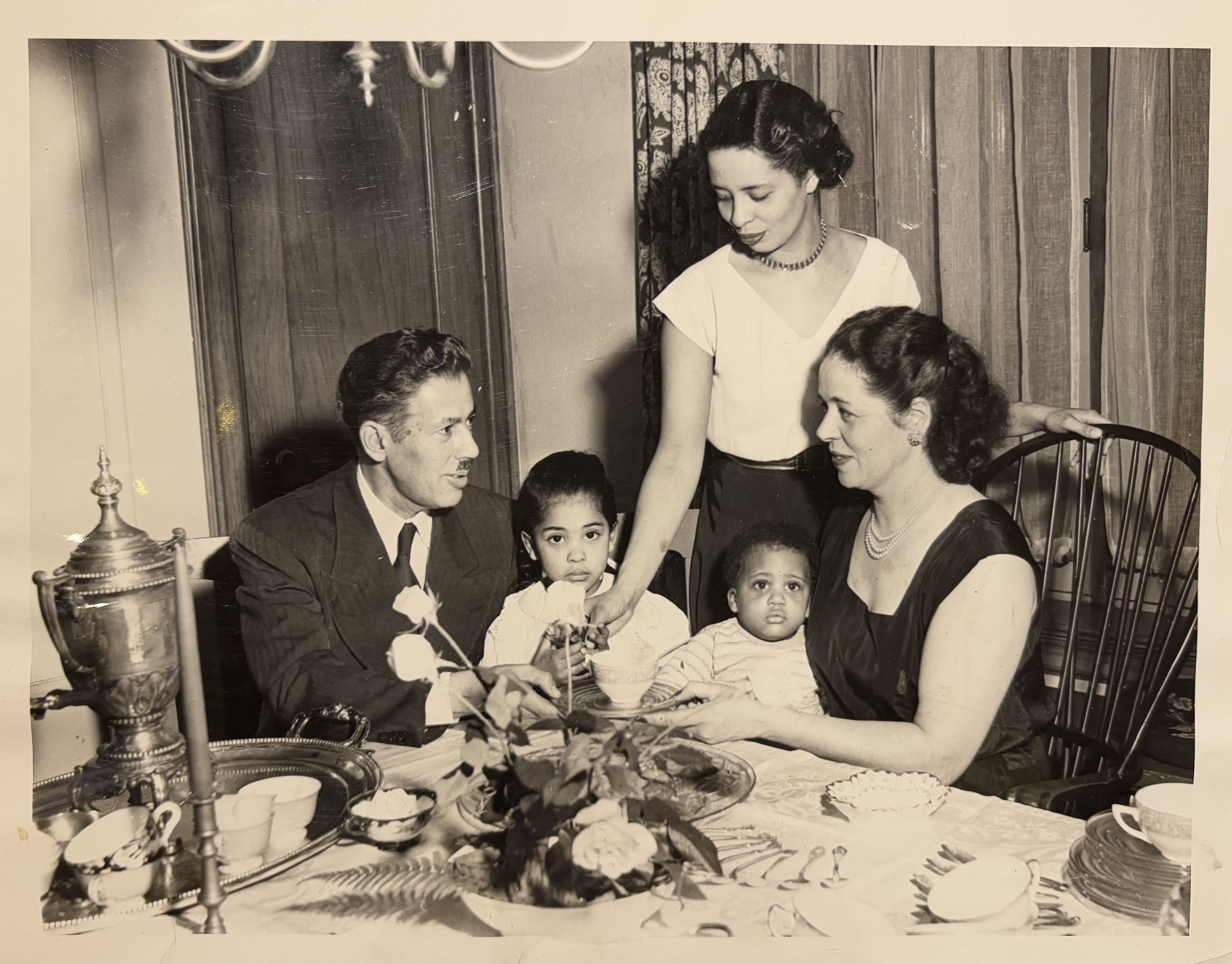
- Born: November 11, 1893; Scranton, Pennsylvania
- Died: October 10, 1979 (aged 85); Pullman, Washington
- Education: Wilberforce University; Payne Theological Seminary; Meadville Lombard Theological School
- Occupations: Unitarian minister and activist
- Known for: One of the first African American ministers in the Unitarian church
- Movement: Civil Rights Movement
- Spouses: Ruth Lewis (m. 1916; died 1922) Ross. Lavinia Jackson (m. 1929; div. 1943) Marcella Walker (m. 1945)
- Children: 3, including Charles

Lewis Allen McGee (November 11, 1893 – October 10, 1979) was an American Army chaplain during World War I, Unitarian minister, and activist. He was among the first African American ministers of the Unitarian church and was active in the Civil Rights Movement.

== Early life and military career ==
The son of a former slave and Methodist Episcopal minister, Lewis Allen McGee was born in 1893 in Scranton, Pennsylvania. After attending the University of Pittsburgh and Payne Theological Seminary, he was ordained in the African Methodist Episcopal Church (AME) in 1915 at the age of 22. He served as an Army chaplain from September 26, 1918 to early 1919 during World War I. From 1943 to 1945, during World War II, McGee ministered as chaplain at the Battle of the Bulge. When the German Army launched its Ardennes offensive in December 1944, McGee was ministering to the 95th Engineer General Services Regiment, a black engineers’ battalion in Bastogne, Luxembourg, Belgium. During his military career, McGee served as a Chairman in the American Legion and a Master in the Masonic Lodge.

He was the father of famed Tuskegee Airman Charles McGee.

== Theological career ==
Discharged from the military on December 21, 1945, McGee entered Meadville Lombard Theological School and received his doctoral degree in 1949, becoming one of the first African American ministers of the Unitarian church. His experience in an integrated Army led to his interest in creating an interracial congregation, and with his third wife Marcella Walker and her brother George Walker Jnr., he founded the interracial Free Religious Fellowship of the Unitarian Church in Chicago in 1947. McGee served as minister to a largely African American congregation from 1948 to 1953, with his experiences described in the chapter 'A Dream Pursued' in the book Black Pioneers in a White Denomination. In 1950, McGee was the President of the Chicago area Liberal Ministers' Association. A member of the American Humanist Association, McGee's theological career dealt with issues at the intersection of race and humanism, the belief in the ability and responsibility of human beings to lead personal lives of ethical fulfillment that aspire to the greater good of humanity. Now named the All Souls Free Religious Fellowship, the church remains an active Unitarian Universalist congregation of colour.

== Later life, death, and legacy ==
McGee went on to serve interracial Unitarian congregations in Springfield, Ohio and Los Angeles, Chico, Anaheim, and Pasadena, California. McGee retired in 1967 as a Minister Emeritus, granted to honor long and meritorious service to a congregation where the minister has given devoted and competent ministerial leadership. He died at Memorial Hospital in Pullman, Washington on October 10, 1979, after a long illness, at the age of 85. The Meadville Lombard Theological School maintains the Lewis McGee Papers, a collection which includes sermons, orders of service, correspondence, church bulletins, and newspaper clippings
