= Changing table =

Platform for changing a child's diaper

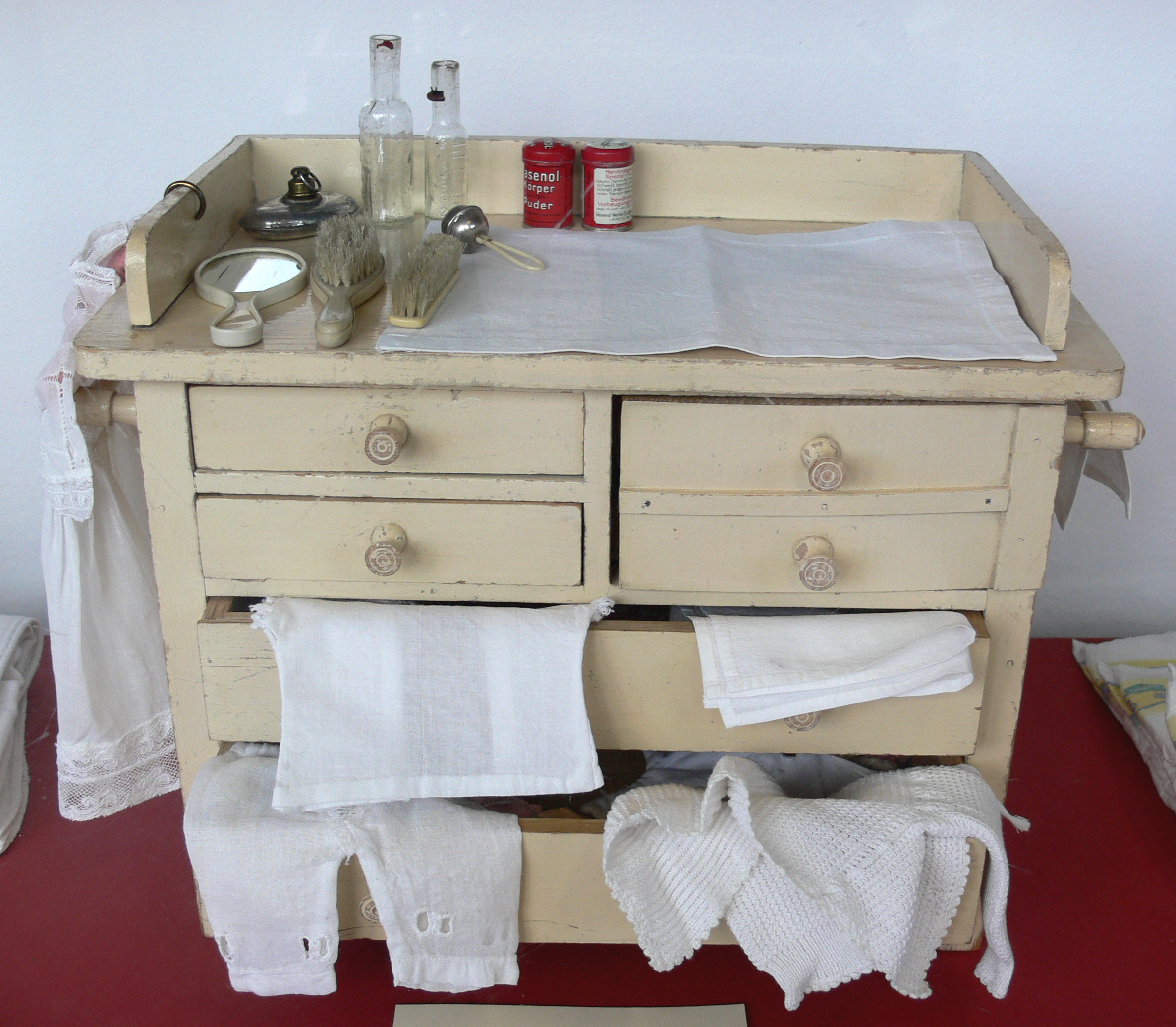
A changing table

A changing table is raised platform designed to allow a person to change an individual's diaper. Primarily used with children, it is common to use a changing table until the child is around 2 years old, however some use it considerably longer or shorter. Adult changing tables (or universal changing tables), though less frequently available, also serve the needs of incontinent older children and adults.

As children become older they may become more mobile and active, and then some parents choose to do the changing procedure on the floor instead. It has been estimated that a child will have used 2400 diapers before it has become 1 year old, which equates to about 6.6 diapers per day. Most children stop using diapers some time between 2 and 5 years of age.

== Safety ==
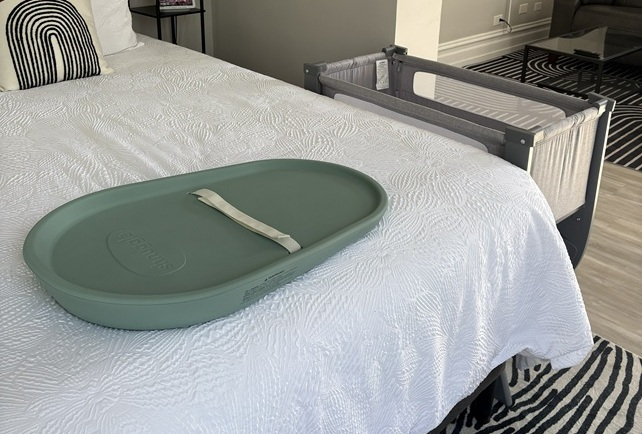
PU changing mat with safety belt

Experts recommend that a changing table have a safety edge to prevent the child from falling down in case the operator is not watching the child. However, no safety device is reliable and experts have warned operators not to turn away when the child is lying on the changing table, but if one has to turn away they recommend that the operator keep one hand on the baby in case it suddenly moves or starts to crawl.

Some newer polyurethane (PU) changing mats also incorporate a simple safety-belt or strap system designed to help keep the infant from rolling or sliding during a diaper change. These systems are intended as an added precaution and do not replace caregiver supervision.

== Public changing tables ==
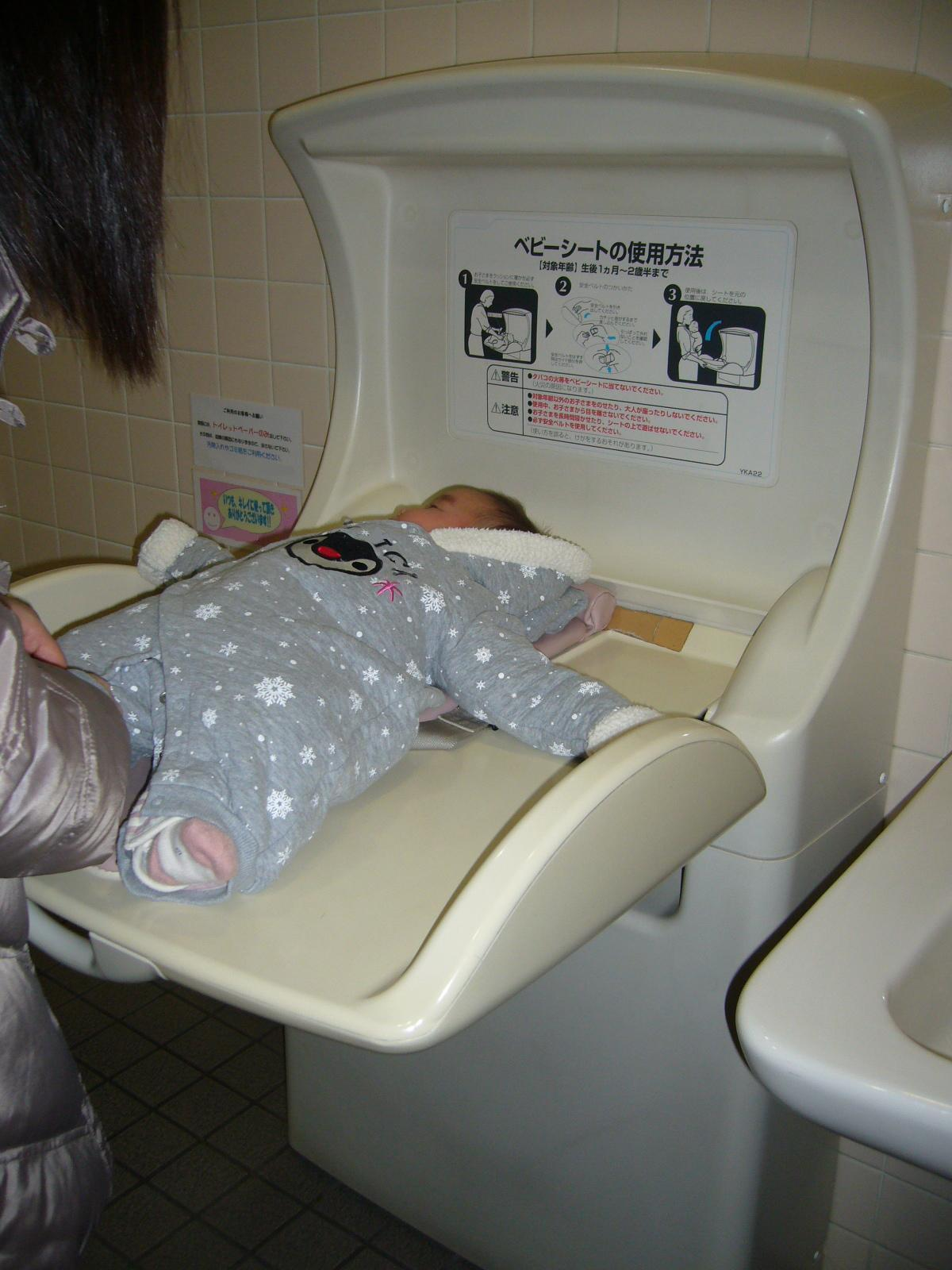
A changing table in a public restroom in Japan

Many public restrooms have public tables available should a diaper change be required in a public place. They are typically made of hard plastic and rest on hinges so they can be folded into the wall when not in use. They are usually not enclosed in a stall.

These became popular in the 1990s. Originally, they were mainly found in women's restrooms. Through the lobbying efforts of Eric Letts, a founder of the Fair Parenting Project, it became commonplace to find them in men's rooms across Canada and the United States.

In 2016, President Obama signed the BABIES Act into law, requiring changing tables in all publicly accessible, federal buildings in the United States.

== Adult changing tables ==
Adult changing tables (or universal changing tables) also serve the needs of incontinent older children and adults.. As the Americans With Disabilities Act does not explicitly require public restrooms be equipped with adult changing tables, adult sized changing tables are not as readily available. Due to a lack of access, caregivers alternatively resort to changing diapers on the floor of a restroom or vehicle. Disability rights activists often refer to this practice as degrading, unsanitary, and dehumanizing.

The bipartisan FAA Reauthorization Act requires all airports receiving federal improvement grants to include at least one adult changing station per airport terminal. In 12 American states (as of March 2025), state or local legislation requires adult changing stations to varying degrees.
