= International Business College (Fort Wayne, Indiana) =

For-profit college in Fort Wayne, Indiana, US (1889–2017)

Location
- United States; 41.035116°N 85.257782°W

Information
- Type: For-profit college
- Motto: Finish First
- Established: 1889
- Closed: 2017
- President: Jim Zillman
- Accreditation: Accrediting Council for Independent Colleges and Schools
- Website: www.ibcfortwayne.edu

International Business College was a for-profit college located in Fort Wayne, Indiana. The institution was founded in 1889 and was located in the Village at Coventry. This campus closed at the end of the 2017.

== Student body, admissions, and outcomes ==
According to Peterson's and recent institutional publications, International Business College has an undergraduate population of 438. Of 747 applicants, 556 were admitted. According to College Navigator, for the most recent year, the graduation/retention rate was 73%.

== Accreditation ==
International Business College was accredited by the Accrediting Council for Independent Colleges and Schools.
