= List of National League presidents =

The National League president was the chief executive of the National League of professional baseball until 1999, when the NL and the American League merged into Major League Baseball.

== National League presidents ==
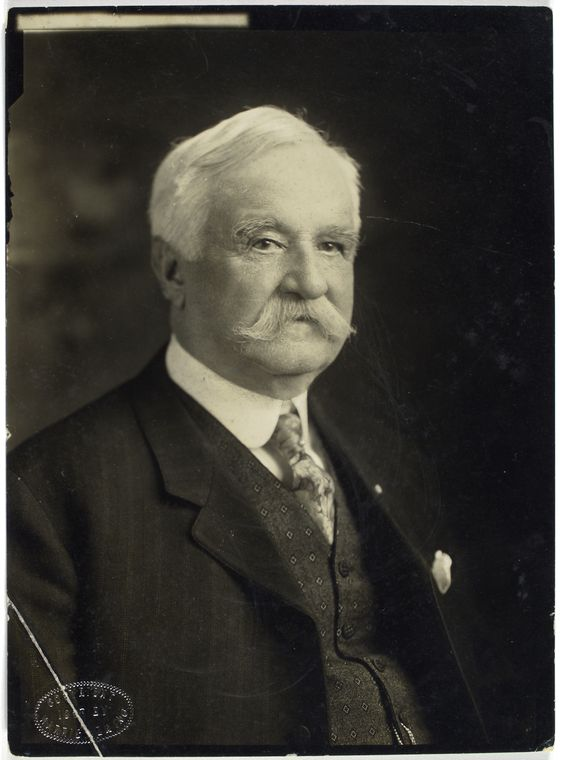
Morgan Bulkeley, the first president of the National League

Key
†	Member of the Baseball Hall of Fame

Name	Year(s)	Ref(s)
Morgan Bulkeley^{†}	1876	
William Hulbert^{†}	1877–1882	
Arthur Soden	1882	
Abraham G. Mills	1883–1884	
Nicholas Young	1885–1902	
Harry Pulliam	1903–1909	
John Heydler	1909	
Thomas Lynch	1910–1913	
John K. Tener	1913–1918	
John Heydler	1918–1934	
Ford C. Frick^{†}	1934–1951	
Warren Giles^{†}	1951–1969	
Chub Feeney	1970–1986	
A. Bartlett Giamatti	1986–1989	
Bill White	1989–1994	
Leonard S. Coleman, Jr.	1994–1999	

=== Honorary president ===
Following the 1999 season, the American and National Leagues were merged with Major League Baseball, and the leagues ceased to exist as business entities. The role of the league president was eliminated. In 2001, Bill Giles, son of Warren Giles, was named honorary president of the NL.

Key
†	Member of the Baseball Hall of Fame

Name	Years	Ref
Bill Giles	2001–2026	

== See also ==
- List of American League presidents
