= Leslie O'Connor =

American lawyer

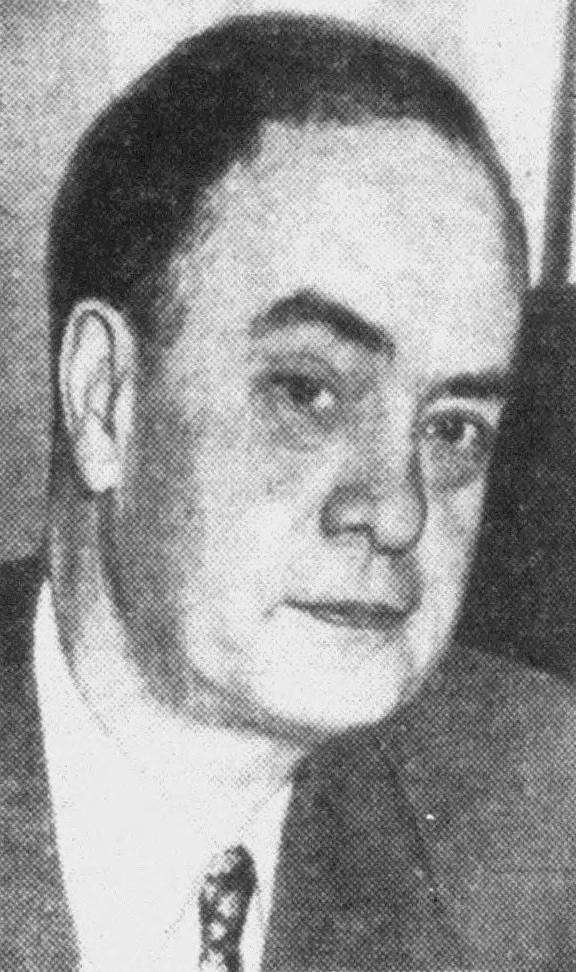
- O'Connor, circa 1947
- Born: August 31, 1889; Chicago, Illinois, U.S.
- Died: January 20, 1966 (aged 76); Tokyo, Japan
- Occupations: Attorney; baseball executive
- Years active: 1921–1959

Leslie Michael O'Connor (August 31, 1889 – January 20, 1966) was an American lawyer and professional baseball executive. He was the assistant to the Commissioner of Baseball from January 1921 until the death of Commissioner Kenesaw Mountain Landis on November 25, 1944; then he filled the void as acting commissioner (technically, as chairman of the Major League Advisory Council) until the election of Happy Chandler as Landis' successor on April 24, 1945. After spending another six months in the commissioner's office as Chandler's top assistant, O'Connor became general manager of the Chicago White Sox of Major League Baseball from November 1945 through November 1948, and he later served as president of the Pacific Coast League.

== Aide to Landis ==
Born in Chicago, Illinois, O'Connor was admitted to the bar and served in World War I as a member of the Judge Advocate General's Corps. When Landis was appointed Commissioner of Baseball in the wake of the 1919 Black Sox Scandal, O'Connor became his top administrator, succeeding John E. Bruce, who had been the top administrator for the National Baseball Commission.

O'Connor served at Landis' side for 24 seasons until the commissioner's sudden death in 1944. As Landis' right-hand man, he was involved in investigations, writing Landis' decisions and keeping records. After five months as acting commissioner—head of the three-man council that included league presidents Ford Frick and Will Harridge—during the waning months of World War II, O'Connor stepped aside for Chandler and was his top aide during the transition until November 3, 1945.

== White Sox general manager ==
O'Connor then was named general manager of the White Sox by team owner Grace Comiskey and held that post for three losing campaigns. His second full season, 1947, was marred by a tense confrontation with Chandler.

Earlier that year, O'Connor's White Sox had signed a 17-year-old local schoolboy pitcher named George Zoeterman out of Chicago Christian High School to a contract that was promptly approved by American League president Harridge. In late October, the commissioner's office voided the Zoeterman contract, charging that the White Sox had violated Rule 3 of the major-minor league agreement, which governed the signing of high school players. O'Connor—who had authored Rule 3 himself as Landis' chief advisor—violently disagreed and publicly defied Chandler. The commissioner then fined the White Sox $500 and suspended them from the major league agreement, a potential expulsion from Major League Baseball itself. Chandler also had O'Connor removed from the MLB Executive Council. The team and O'Connor were forced to capitulate, and Zoeterman eventually signed with the rival Chicago Cubs; he would post a poor 16–23 record in four minor league seasons before leaving baseball.

After the White Sox lost 101 games and finished last among the eight team American League teams in 1948, O'Connor stepped down and was succeeded by Frank Lane. The club won 195 games and lost 262 (.427) during O'Connor's tenure as GM.

== President of Pacific Coast League ==
He remained in baseball, however, as a member of the Major-Minor League Executive Council, and then as legal counsel for and president of the top-level Pacific Coast League. As PCL president from 1956 through 1959, O'Connor was in office during the tumultuous shift of the Dodgers and Giants from New York City to Los Angeles and San Francisco, which resulted in a significant alteration of the PCL map. During O'Connor's four-year term, the league replaced four teams located in the metro areas of those cities with clubs in Vancouver (Oakland Oaks), Salt Lake City (Hollywood Stars), Phoenix (San Francisco Seals) and Spokane (Los Angeles Angels).

A resident of Phoenix and Crystal Lake, Illinois, in retirement, O'Connor suffered a fatal heart attack in Tokyo at the age of 76 while on a visit with his wife to Japan.

Preceded by Harry Grabiner	Chicago White Sox general manager 1946–1948	Succeeded by Frank Lane
Preceded by Pep Goodwin	Pacific Coast League president 1956–1959	Succeeded by Dewey Soriano
