= Harry Grabiner =

American baseball executive

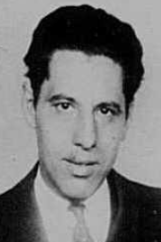
- Harry Grabiner in 1924
- Born: December 26, 1890; Chicago, Illinois, U.S.
- Died: October 24, 1948 (aged 57); Chicago, Illinois, U.S.
- Burial place: Rosehill Cemetery
- Occupation: Baseball executive
- Years active: 1915–1948

Harry Mitchell Grabiner (December 26, 1890 – October 24, 1948) was an American professional baseball executive. A 40-year employee of the Chicago White Sox, he served the team's owners—founding president Charles Comiskey, son and successor J. Louis Comiskey, and Lou's widow, Grace—in a number of capacities, rising from peanut vendor to club secretary, business manager and vice president. He is often listed as the White Sox' first general manager, with a term lasting from as early as 1915 through 1945. After leaving the White Sox at the close of the 1945 season, he joined Bill Veeck's ownership syndicate and became a vice president and minority stockholder with the Cleveland Indians from 1946 until his death in 1948.

== Witness to Black Sox Scandal ==
As team secretary and top aide to Charles Comiskey, Grabiner was a management eyewitness to the 1919 Black Sox Scandal, in which eight White Sox players were accused of conspiring with gamblers to lose the 1919 World Series.

Eighteen years after Grabiner's death, Veeck revealed in The Hustler's Handbook (1966) that during his first stint (1959–61) as owner of the White Sox, he had discovered hidden in a Comiskey Park storeroom a diary Grabiner kept during the 1919 season and during subsequent investigations and legal actions in 1920–21. In the chapter "Harry's Diary," Veeck quotes from Grabiner's document and writes, "Beyond any doubt, the White Sox front office had more than some inkling of what was going on from the very first game of the 1919 World Series." Some accounts state that Grabiner warned Comiskey, American League president Ban Johnson and National League president John Heydler of a possible game-fixing scandal after Game 2 of the Series, but he was ignored.

After the Black Sox affair, Grabiner, who was Jewish, was attacked in print by The Dearborn Independent, owned by industrialist Henry Ford, in anti-Semitic articles that blamed the Jews for both the scandal and the cover-up.

== Four decades with White Sox ==
Born in Chicago on December 26, 1890, Grabiner began his career with the White Sox at age 14; some accounts list his first job as a peanut vendor at South Side Park, others as a ticket seller and usher. He became a protégé of club secretary Charles Fredericks and was promoted to his mentor's position on Fredericks' death in 1915. As such, Grabiner also witnessed the White Sox' triumphs in the 1906 and 1917 World Series, and the building of Comiskey Park in 1910, as well as the 1919 debacle.

Although the eight players accused of the Black Sox conspiracy were acquitted in a 1920 trial, all were banned from baseball for life. The scandal destroyed the White Sox for a generation; during Grabiner's final quarter century with the team, Chicago finished in the American League's first division only five times. The White Sox did not win another pennant until 1959, or another World Series until 2005. After Charles Comiskey's death in 1931, Grabiner assumed greater responsibility for the team's on-field operations during the J. Lou and Grace Comiskey regimes, and became a target for fan frustration.

"Grabiner was blasphemed by the fans and players, criticized by the press, and generally blamed for inefficacies which were not of his own doing. Yet he struggled doggedly against the great odds until he fled the scene," wrote John C. Hoffman in Baseball Digest in October 1950, two years after Grabiner's death.

== Final years with Veeck, Indians ==
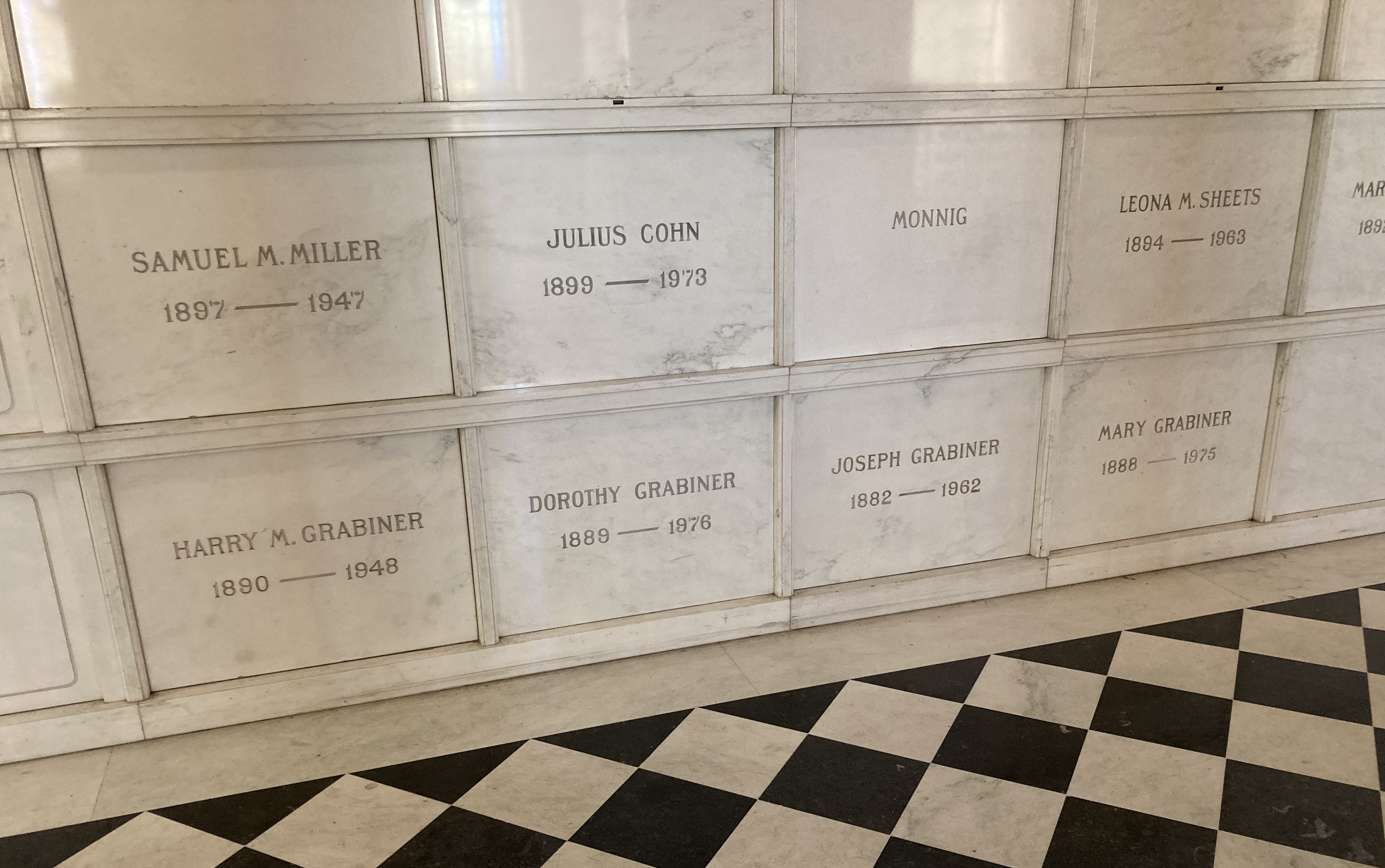
Grabiner's grave at Rosehill Mausoleum

Grabiner's last two years in baseball were successful ones, however, as he worked with Veeck to purchase the Cleveland Indians in 1946 and served as Veeck's vice president and top assistant, as well as holding a small stake in the team. But in the closing weeks of Cleveland's 1948 world championship season, Grabiner collapsed in Veeck's office during a meeting. Suffering from a condition that has been variously described as a stroke, cerebral hemorrhage or brain tumor, he lapsed into a coma and never witnessed the Tribe's AL playoff win over the Boston Red Sox or its six-game victory in the 1948 World Series. He died in Chicago, age 57, thirteen days after the final Series game. He was interred at Rosehill Mausoleum in Rosehill Cemetery.

== In popular culture ==
In the 1987 John Sayles film Eight Men Out, based on the 1963 book, Eight Men Out: The Black Sox and the 1919 World Series by Eliot Asinof, Grabiner was portrayed by Jack Merrill.
