= Tieber =

Tieber is a surname. Notable people with the surname include:

- Elisabeth Tieber (born 1990), Austrian footballer
- László Tieber (born 1949), Hungarian footballer
- Michael Tieber (born 1988), Austrian footballer

== See also ==
- Teber
- Wieber
