= John E. Bruce =

American lawyer (1856–1924)

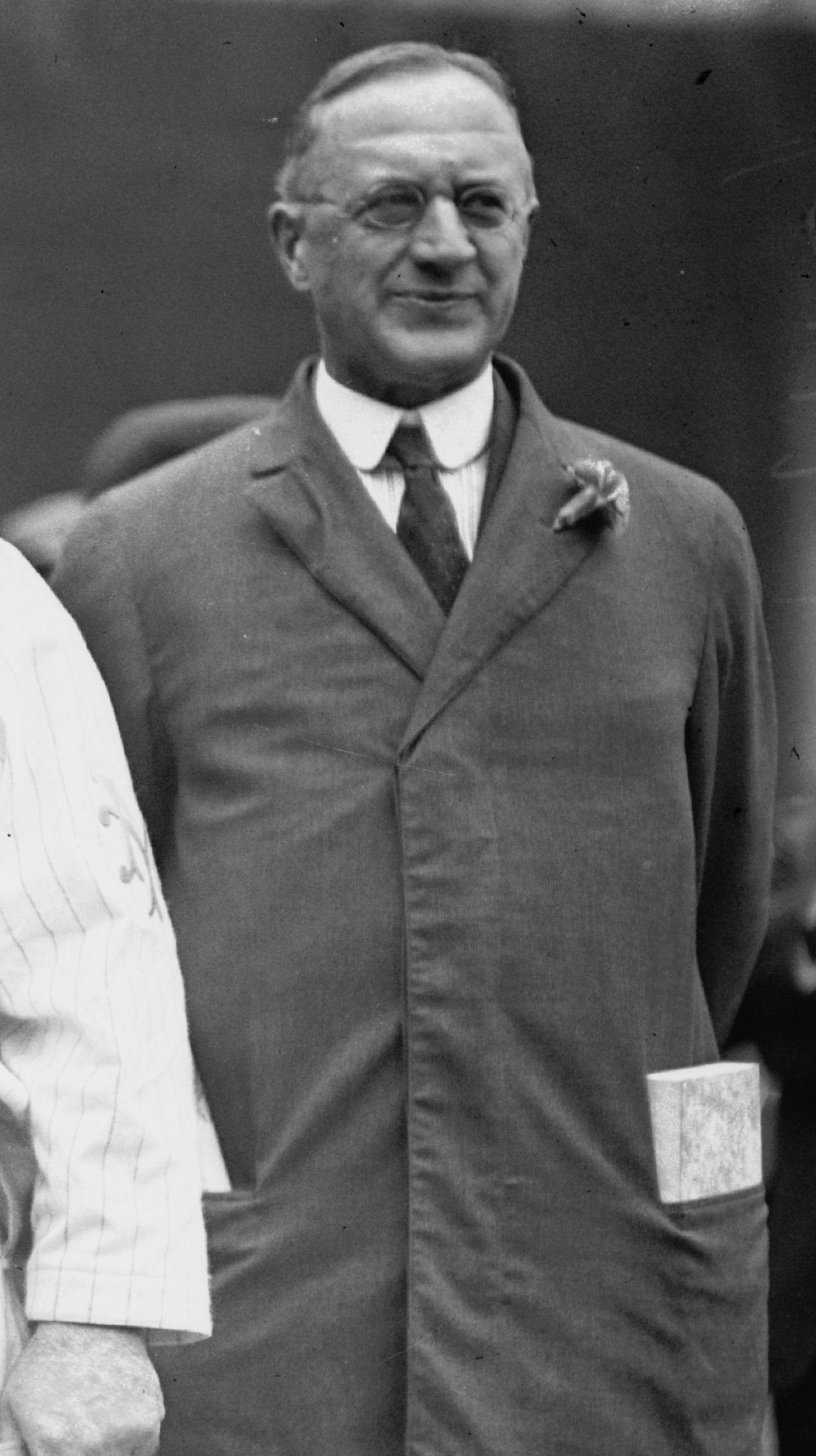
- Bruce in 1913

Member of the Ohio House of Representatives
- In office 1883–1885

Personal details
- Born: October 1, 1856 Cleveland, Ohio, U.S.
- Died: August 17, 1924 (aged 67) Cincinnati, Ohio, U.S.
- Party: Democratic
- Spouse: Alice Straight Knowlton (m. 1883; died 1922)
- Children: 2
- Education: Western Reserve University (BA, MA)

John Eldridge Bruce (October 1, 1856 – August 17, 1924) was an American lawyer, politician, and civil servant. He served in the Ohio House of Representatives and mayor of College Hill, Ohio. Bruce became the personal attorney to Ban Johnson, the president of the American League, and Bruce served as the secretary of the National Baseball Commission from 1903 to 1920.

== Early life and career ==
Bruce was born on October 1, 1856, in Cleveland, Ohio, the son of Eli M. Bruce, an editor of The Plain Dealer. When he was young, the family moved to Aurora, Ohio. Bruce graduated from Western Reserve College with a Bachelor of Arts in 1876. He was a member of Phi Gamma Delta. After graduating, Bruce worked as a teacher and the principal of a high school in Hudson, Ohio, from 1876 to 1879.

== Law and politics ==
In April 1879, Bruce passed the bar exam. He moved to Cincinnati, Ohio, and worked as an assistant for the Associated Press from 1879 to 1883. He earned a Master of Arts from Adelbert College of Western Reserve University in 1884, and also worked as the editor of the college news division of the Cincinnati Commercial Gazette from 1880 to 1888. In 1889, he established a law partnership with Jacob H. Bromwell, which lasted until Bromwell's death in 1924.

Bruce won an election to the Ohio House of Representatives in 1883. He served one term as a member of the Democratic Party during the 66th Ohio General Assembly, In 1885, Bruce was appointed assistant United States Attorney for the southern district of Ohio by President Grover Cleveland.

On May 9, 1892, Bruce was elected to be the mayor of College Hill, Ohio. He was continually reelected until College Hill was annexed into Cincinnati. Bruce was also appointed to be the first assistant United States Attorney during President Cleveland's second term, from 1893 to 1897. He was a presidential elector for the unsuccessful Democratic ticket of Alton B. Parker and Henry G. Davis during the 1904 United States presidential election.

In 1911, Bruce was appointed to the Cincinnati Board of Park Commissioners. In 1913, Bruce and Herbert S. Bigelow campaigned in favor a new city charter for Cincinnati, but the voters rejected their referendum.

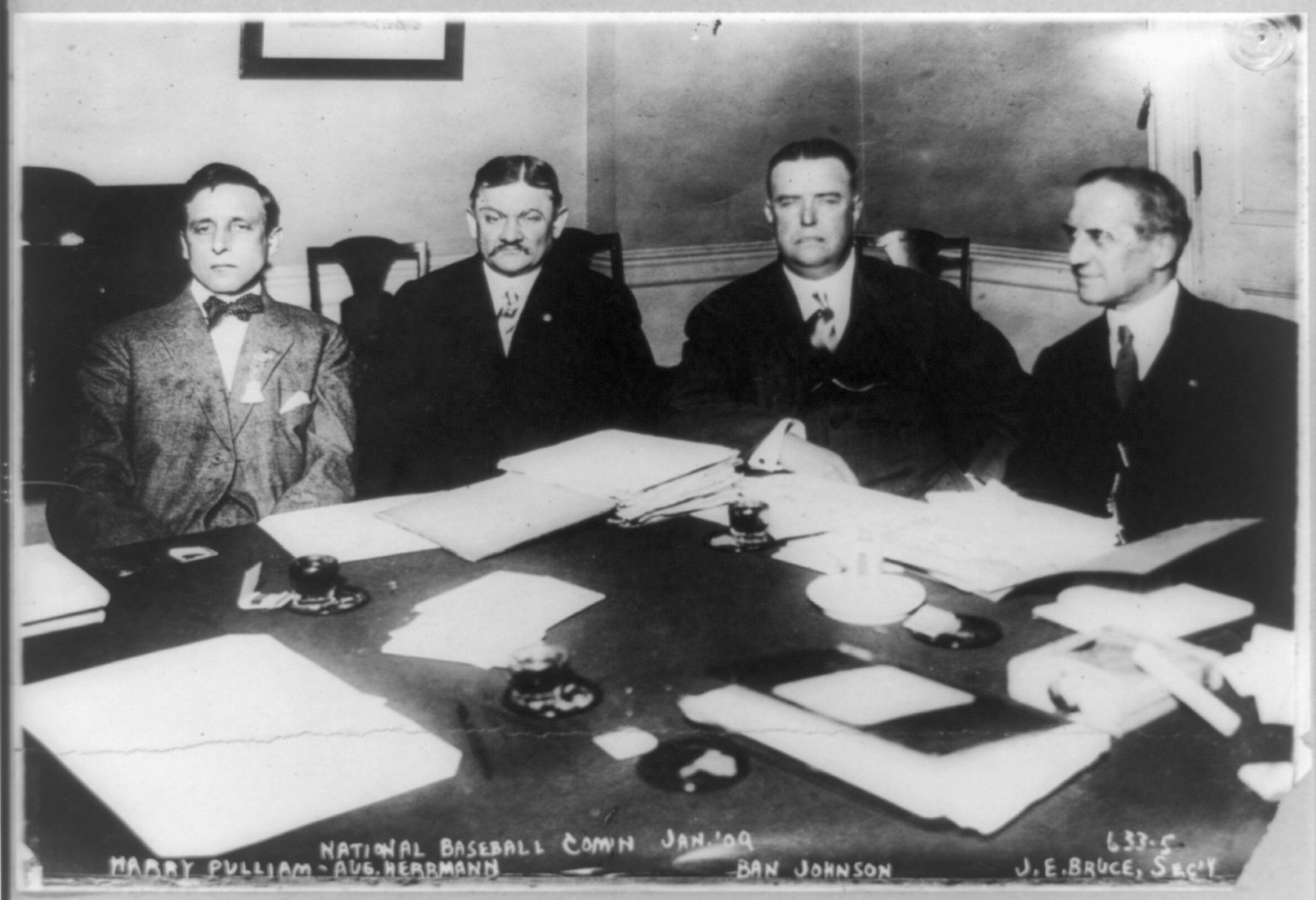
The National Baseball Commission in 1909: Harry Pulliam (far left), August Herrmann (middle left), Ban Johnson (middle right) and Bruce (far right)

== Baseball ==
While working at the Associated Press, Bruce met reporter Ban Johnson, and they became friends. Johnson became president of the newly reformed Western League, a minor baseball league, in 1894. Bruce served as his personal attorney as Johnson changed the league into the American League (AL), declaring it to be a major league, entering into conflict with the National League (NL). Bruce was one of the first investors in the St. Louis Browns and became a director of the team.

When the National Baseball Commission was formed in the 1903 peace agreement between the AL and NL, Bruce was elected secretary and treasurer. He served in these roles on the commission until its dissolution in 1920. He was succeeded as baseball's top administrator by Leslie O'Connor.

In 1946, a special committee named Bruce Honor Rolls of Baseball during balloting for the National Baseball Hall of Fame.

== Personal life ==
Bruce married Alice Straight Knowlton on December 12, 1883. They had two children, Carolyn and Edward. Edward also became a lawyer and an assistant United States attorney, but he died of influenza in 1918. Alice died in January 1922.

Bruce was hospitalized for an illness in April 1924 and suffered a stroke while recuperating in May. He died in his Cincinnati home on August 17, 1924. Bruce was buried at Spring Grove Cemetery in Cincinnati.
