= Tener =

Tener is a surname. Notable people with the surname include:

- John K. Tener (1863–1946), American baseball player, baseball executive, and politician
- Caroline Tener Brown (born 1960), American ballet dancer, ballet coach, and actress

== See also ==
- Teber
