= August Herrmann =

American baseball executive and political figure in Cincinnati

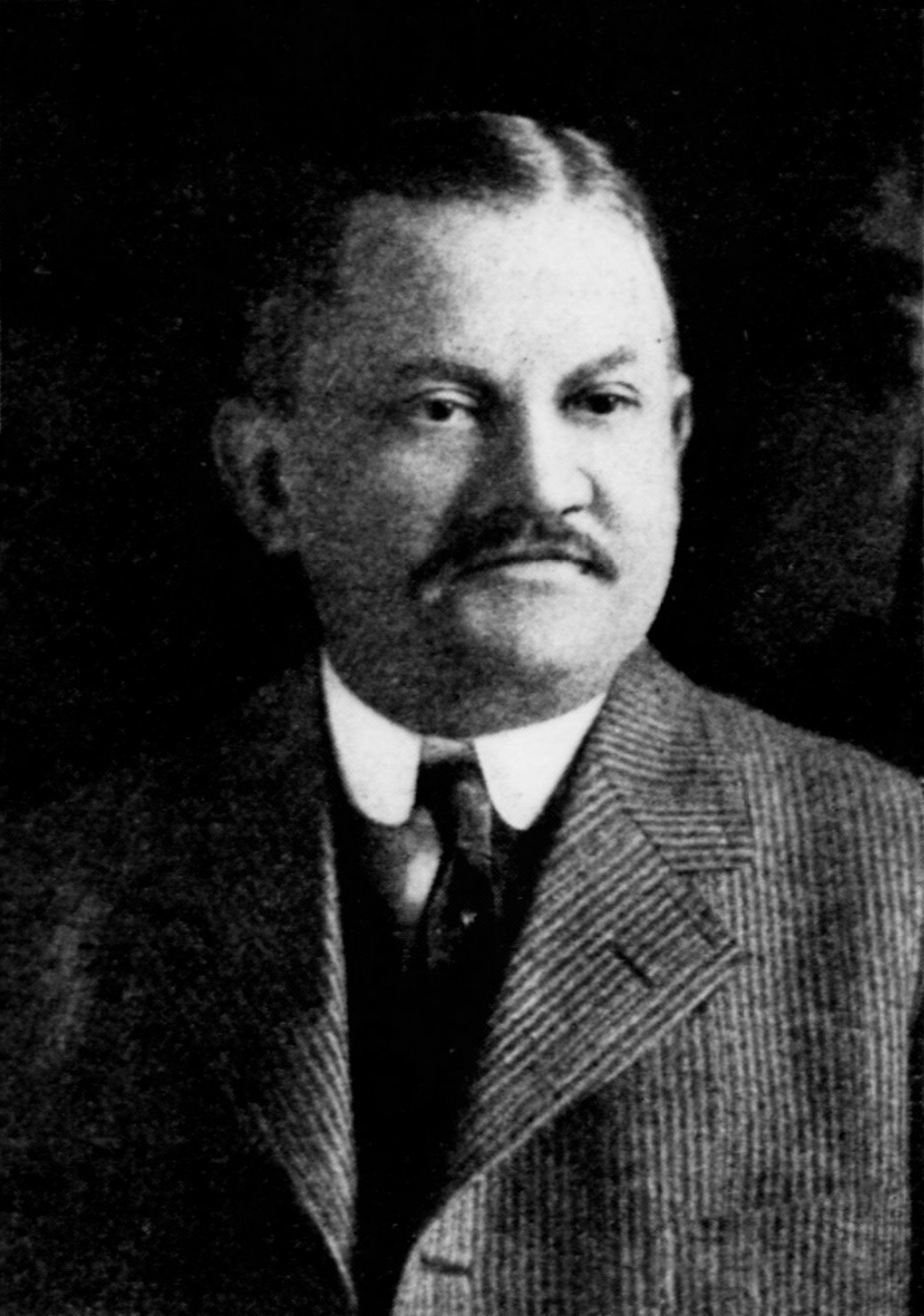
- Herrmann c. 1914
- Born: May 3, 1859; Cincinnati, Ohio, U.S.
- Died: April 25, 1931 (aged 71); Cincinnati, Ohio, U.S.
- Occupations: Cincinnati Board of Administration (1891–1896); Cincinnati Commissioner of Water Works (c. 1896); President of the Cincinnati Reds (1902–1927); President of National Baseball Commission (1903–1920)
- Awards: Honor Rolls of Baseball (1946); Cincinnati Reds Hall of Fame (2008)

August "Garry" Herrmann (May 3, 1859 – April 25, 1931) was an American political operative for Cincinnati political boss George B. Cox, an executive of the Cincinnati Reds baseball team, and president of the National Baseball Commission. In 1946, he was named in the Honor Rolls of Baseball.

== Biography ==
Herrmann was born in Cincinnati, Ohio, on May 3, 1859, to a family of German descent. He learned typesetting at a young age, and became a member of the International Typographical Union. He then held various public positions in Cincinnati; as a member of the board of education (elected in 1882), assistant clerk of the police court (appointed in 1887), and a member of the board of administration (appointed in 1891). In 1896, he was appointed to the board of commissioners of the Cincinnati waterworks, and was then selected as the board's chairman.

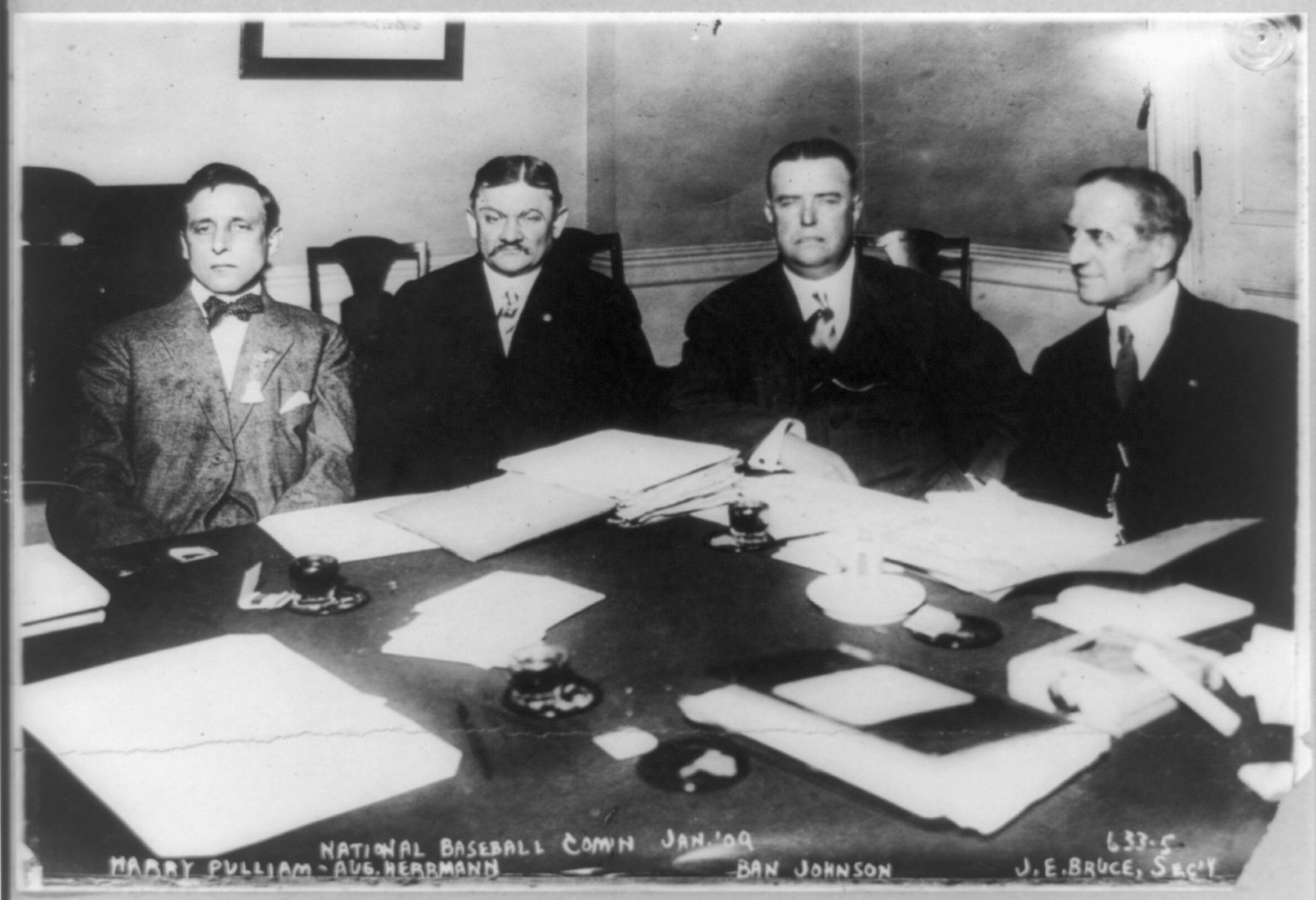
The National Baseball Commission in 1909: Harry Pulliam (far left), Herrmann (middle left), Ban Johnson (middle right), and John E. Bruce (far right)

Herrmann served as president of the Cincinnati Reds of the National League from 1902 to 1927, and served as the president of National Baseball Commission from 1903 to 1920. Herrmann essentially filled the role of Commissioner of Baseball before that position was officially established in 1920. With two other Commission members, he established the annual nature of the World Series by 1905.

Outside of Cincinnati public positions and baseball, Herrmann served as the Grand Exalted Ruler of the Benevolent and Protective Order of Elks (BPOE) in 1910, and was president of the American Bowling Congress in 1908.

Herrmann was married in 1881 and was predeceased by his wife; they had one daughter. Although financially successful, Herrmann had a reputation as a lavish entertainer, supported by news that he left an estate of $10. He died in Cincinnati on April 25, 1931, at age 71.

In 1946, Herrmann was named in the Baseball Hall of Fame's Honor Rolls of Baseball, and on July 19, 2008, he was inducted into the Cincinnati Reds Hall of Fame.
