= National Baseball Commission =

Governing body of baseball (1903–1920)

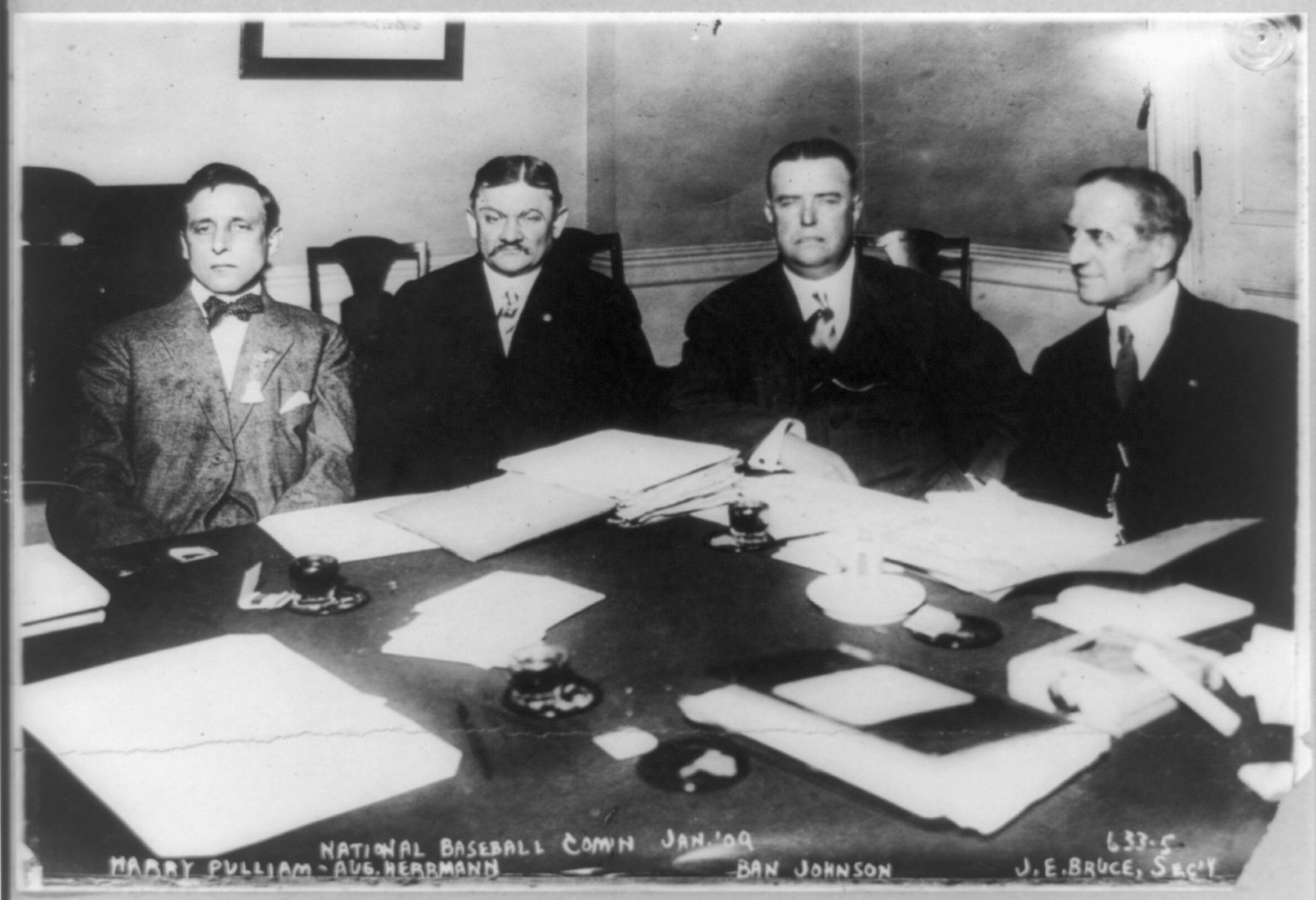
- Harry Pulliam (left), August Herrmann (center left), Ban Johnson (center right), and John E. Bruce (right) in 1909
- Predecessor: none
- Successor: Commissioner of Baseball
- Formation: 1903
- Dissolved: 1920
- Chairman: August Herrmann
- AL president: Ban Johnson
- NL president: Harry Pulliam (1903–1909); John Heydler (1909, 1918–1920); Thomas Lynch (1910–1913); John K. Tener (1913–1918)
- Key people: John E. Bruce, secretary

The National Baseball Commission was the governing body of Major League Baseball and Minor League Baseball from 1903 to 1920. It consisted of a chairman, the presidents of the National League (NL) and American League (AL), and a secretary. The commission was formed as part of the peace agreement between the AL and NL and abolished following the Black Sox Scandal. It was replaced with the commissioner of baseball.

== Background and formation ==
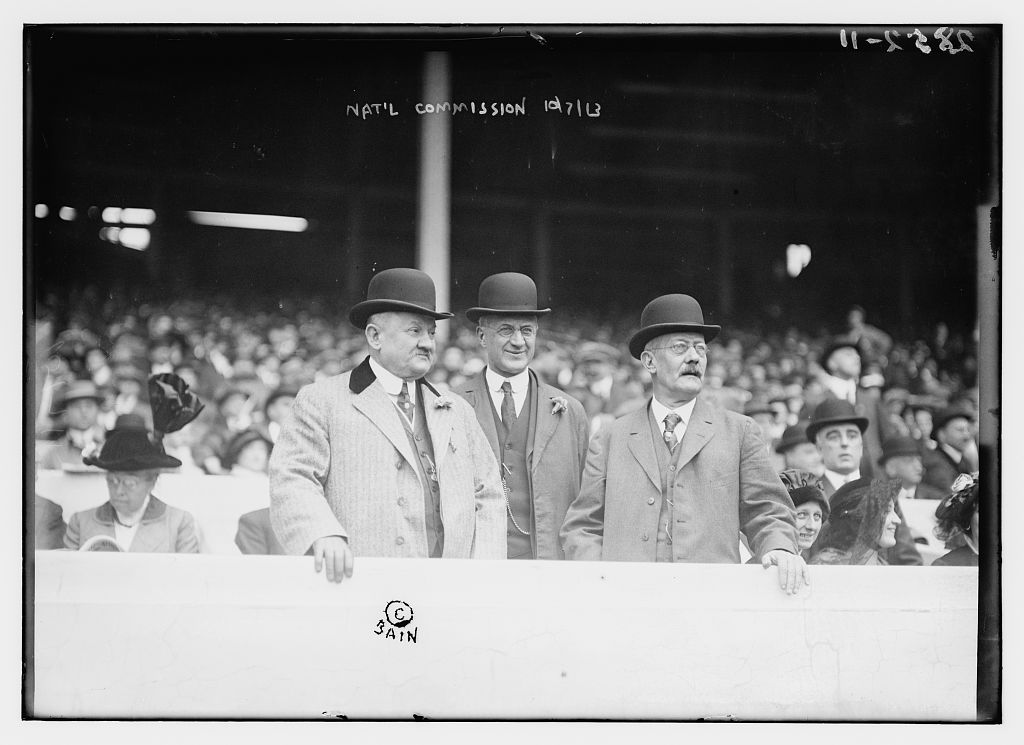
The National Commission at the 1913 World Series

Prior to the 1900 season, the Western League, which had been a minor league located in the Midwestern United States, changed its name to the American League (AL) and moved several of its franchises to larger, strategic locations, including cities abandoned by the National League (NL). In 1901, the American League declared its intent to operate as a major league, challenging the National League.

A peace agreement between the NL and AL was ratified in January 1903. The National Association of Professional Baseball Leagues, the organization of minor baseball leagues, did not agree to the terms of the arrangement. In August 1903, the NL, AL, and minor leagues reached an agreement which established the National Baseball Commission as the governing body for Major League Baseball and Minor League Baseball, commonly referred to as "Organized Baseball". August Herrmann, the owner of the Cincinnati Reds of the NL, served as chairman of the commission, while the presidents of the AL, Ban Johnson, and NL, Harry Pulliam, also had seats on the commission. John E. Bruce, Johnson's personal attorney, was elected secretary and treasurer of the National Commission.

== Challenges ==
The National Commission dealt with conflicts between teams and leagues. One of the most significant conflicts came in when the Pittsburgh Pirates and St. Louis Browns both had claims for George Sisler. Sisler had signed a minor league contract before deciding to attend the University of Michigan, and the Pirates had acquired the contractual rights while Sisler had successful college baseball career. Sisler signed a contract with the Browns after leaving college. In 1912, the commission declared the original contract void because Sisler was a minor without parental permission at the time it was signed, and awarded his rights to the Browns. Barney Dreyfuss, the owner of the Pirates, never forgave Herrmann for the decision and began to work to have him ousted as chairman.

After the 1912 season, Dave Fultz, an attorney and former major league player, attempted to unionize major league players in an organization called the Players Fraternity. He became president, with Ty Cobb, Christy Mathewson, Ed Sweeney, and Red Dooin serving as vice presidents. The group achieved concessions for the players from the National Commission before the 1914 season.

The Federal League declared itself to be a major league in 1914, challenging Organized Baseball. In January 1915, the league filed suit against the National Commission, accusing it and the National Agreement of violating federal antitrust law. The case was assigned to Judge Kenesaw Mountain Landis of the United States District Court for the Northern District of Illinois. Landis opted not to rule on the case, and the Federal League collapsed after the 1915 season. When the two sides returned to his court in February 1916 to have the suit dismissed, Landis said that he waited to see if they could forge a settlement, because he had feared that issuing an injunction would have been harmful to baseball.

In July 1919, Carl Mays left the Boston Red Sox without permission. Johnson demanded that the Red Sox suspend him, but instead, the Red Sox traded Mays to the New York Yankees. Johnson suspended Mays for deserting the Red Sox. Yankees owner Tillinghast Huston accused Johnson of having a financial interest in the Cleveland Indians, Huston and co-owner Jacob Ruppert obtained a temporary injunction allowing Mays to play. New York Supreme Court Justice Robert F. Wagner ruled in favor of the Yankees, granting a permanent injunction. The owners of the Yankees, Red Sox, and Chicago White Sox began to collectively oppose Johnson, becoming known as the "Insurrectos". Though the Insurrectos were outnumbered by the five teams loyal to Johnson, they held three out of the four seats on the league's board of directors.

== Collapse ==
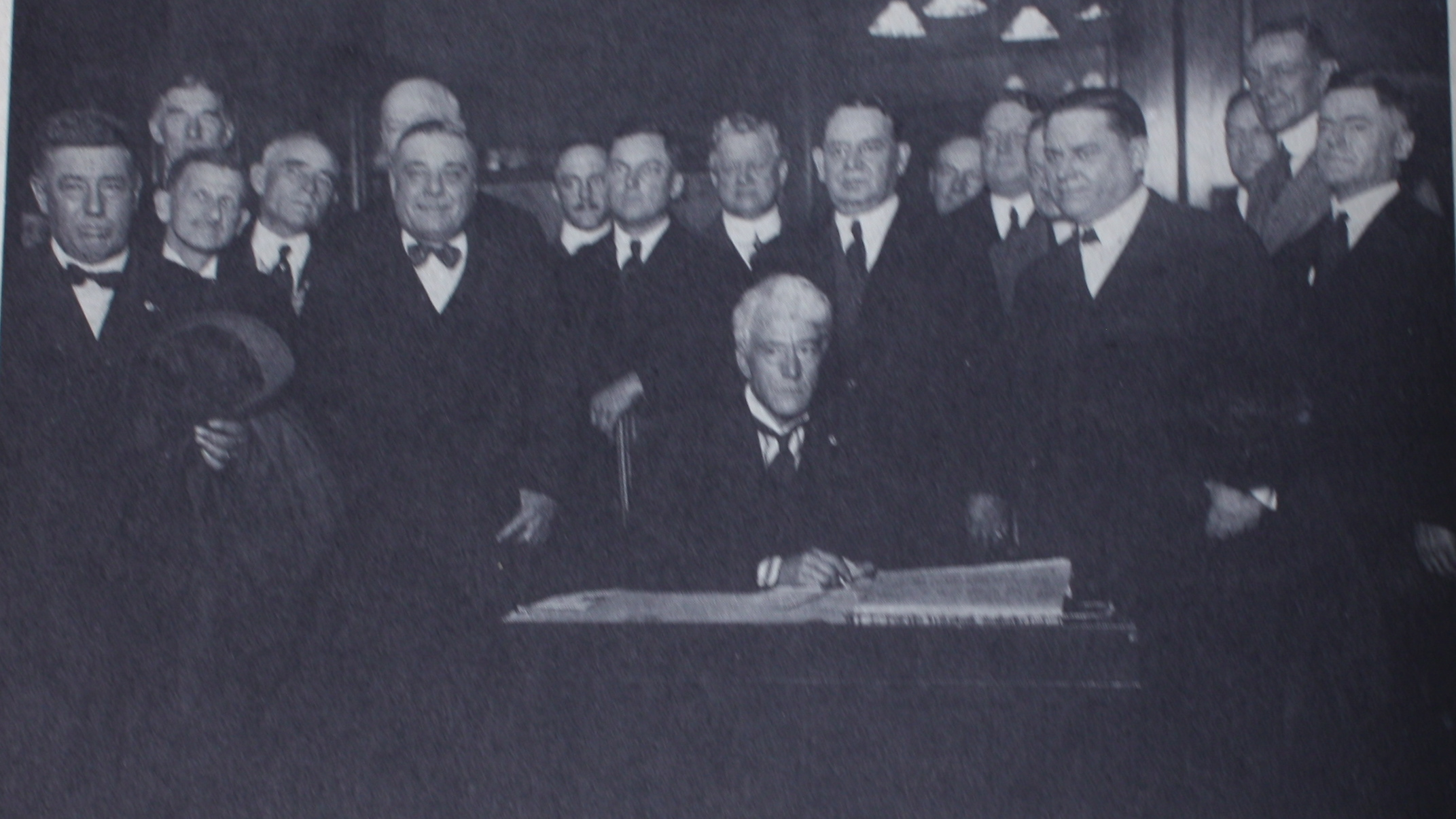
Kenesaw Mountain Landis, surrounded by the major league owners

After the 1918 season, Harry Frazee, the owner of the Red Sox, and Harry Hempstead, the owner of the New York Giants, approached William Howard Taft, the former president of the United States, with an offer to make him baseball's sole commissioner. With other NL owners looking to replace Herrmann as chair of the commission, the new owners of the Giants switched course, supporting Herrmann's reelection to the chairmanship for the 1919 season as revenge for various rules passed by the league that hurt the Giants.

In January 1920, Herrmann resigned from the commission. Johnson and John Heydler, the NL president, were unable to agree on a new chairman.

In September 1920, a grand jury was called in Cook County, Illinois, to address an allegation of match fixing of a game between the Chicago Cubs and Philadelphia Phillies. After investigating corruption in baseball, the grand jury indicted eight members of the White Sox for conspiring to throw the 1919 World Series, known as the Black Sox Scandal. By October 1920, Heydler called for the end of the commission. Albert Lasker proposed the idea of having three individuals with no financial ties to baseball serving on the commission.

All eight teams in the National League, along with the Insurrectos in the American League, threatened to break away from Organized Baseball to form their own 12-team league. They turned to Landis as their preferred choice for commissioner. Landis agreed to serve as Commissioner of Baseball, if he could have sole authority and not share the role with other commissioners. The owners agreed and Landis accepted the position on November 12, 1920, ending the commission.
