= John K. Tener =

Irish-American politician and baseball player (1863–1946)

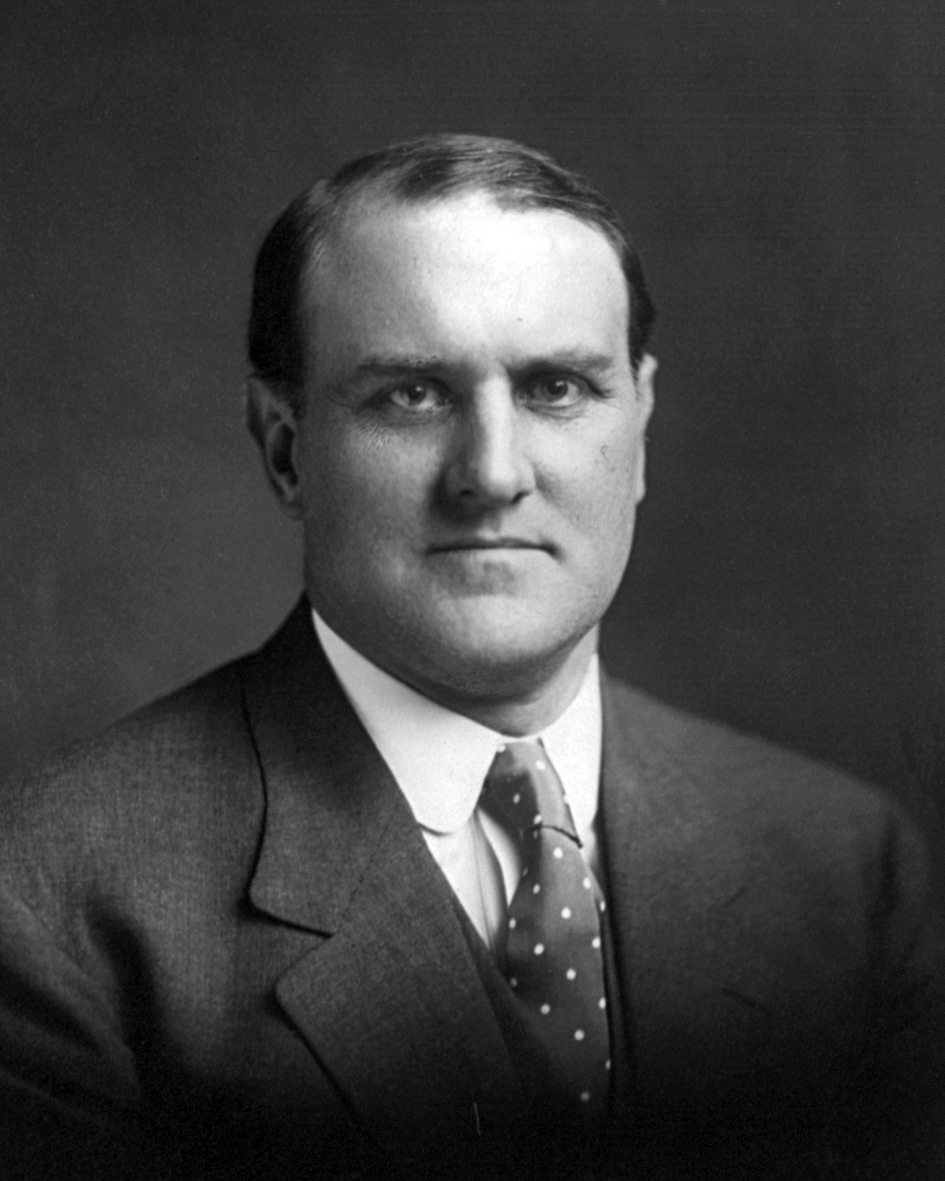
- Tener, c. 1910

25th Governor of Pennsylvania
- In office January 17, 1911 – January 19, 1915
- Lieutenant: John Reynolds
- Preceded by: Edwin Sydney Stuart
- Succeeded by: Martin Brumbaugh

Member of the U.S. House of Representatives from Pennsylvania's 24th district
- In office March 4, 1909 – January 16, 1911
- Preceded by: Ernest Acheson
- Succeeded by: Charles Matthews

6th President of the National League
- In office 1913–1918
- Preceded by: Thomas Lynch
- Succeeded by: John Heydler

Personal details
- Born: John Kinley Tener; July 25, 1863 County Tyrone, Ireland
- Died: May 19, 1946 (aged 82) Pittsburgh, Pennsylvania, U.S.
- Party: Republican
- Spouses: Harriet Day (m. 1889; died 1935) Leone Evans (m. 1936; died 1937)
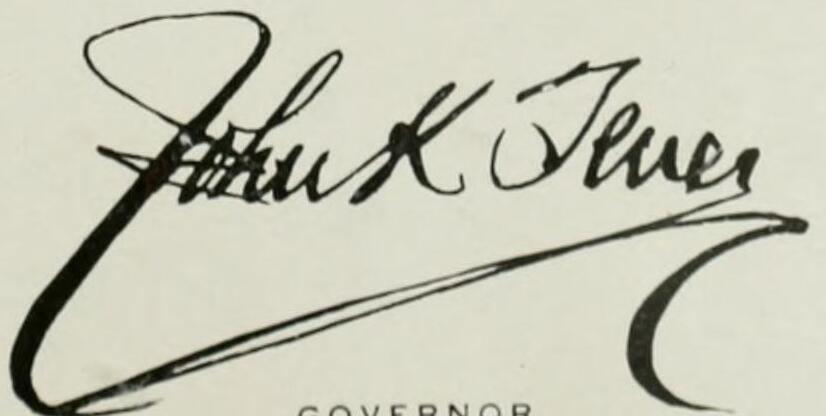
- Signature
- Baseball career
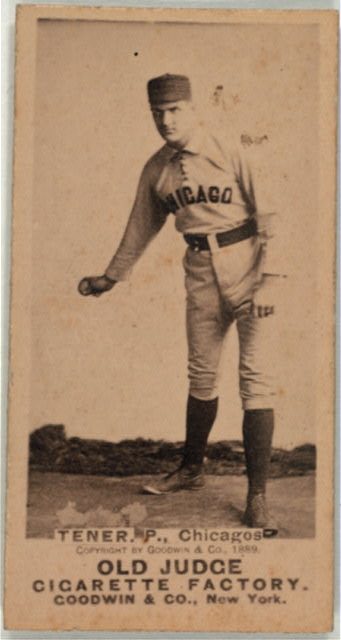
- Pitcher / outfielder
- Batted: Right Threw: Right

MLB debut
- June 8, 1885, for the Baltimore Orioles (American Association)

Last MLB appearance
- October 4, 1890, for the Pittsburgh Burghers

MLB statistics
- Win–loss record: 25–31
- Earned run average: 4.30
- Strikeouts: 174
- Stats at Baseball Reference

Teams
- Baltimore Orioles (1885); Chicago White Stockings (1888–1889); Pittsburgh Burghers (1890)

John Kinley Tener (July 25, 1863 – May 19, 1946) was an Irish-born American politician and Major League Baseball player and executive. He served as the 25th governor of Pennsylvania from 1911 until 1915. A Republican, he had previously served as a U.S. representative for Pennsylvania's 24th congressional district.

During his baseball career, Tener played as a pitcher and outfielder for the Baltimore Orioles of the American Association, the Chicago White Stockings of the National League, and the Pittsburgh Burghers of the Players' League; after his playing career, he served as President of the National League.

== Early life ==
John Tener was born in 1863 in County Tyrone, Ireland. His parents were George Evans Tener and Susan Wallis. In 1872, Tener's father died, and the family moved the following year to Pittsburgh, Pennsylvania.

Tener attended public schools and later worked as a clerk for hardware manufacturer Oliver Iron and Steel Corporation from 1881 to 1885.

== Baseball career ==
In 1885, Tener, who was six-foot-four (1.93 meters), decided to try his hand at professional baseball. He joined the Haverhill, Massachusetts, minor league baseball team in the New England League as a pitcher and outfielder and was a teammate of future Hall of Fame players Wilbert Robinson and Tommy McCarthy. Later that year, Tener made his Major League debut with the Baltimore Orioles of the American Association, playing in a single game as an outfielder.

While playing in Haverhill, Tener met his future wife, Harriet Day. They married in October 1889.

After his brief appearance in Baltimore, Tener continued playing minor league ball, but also returned to the corporate world, working for the Chartiers Valley Gas Company in Pittsburgh and Chambers and McKee Glass Company. In 1888, Cap Anson, the manager of the Chicago White Stockings (now the Chicago Cubs), noticed him pitching in Pittsburgh and signed Tener to a contract. Tener was a pitcher and an outfielder for two years in Chicago with moderate success. He notched a 7–5 record with a 2.74 ERA in 1888 and went 15–15 with a 3.64 ERA in 1889.

After the 1888 season, Tener accompanied the team on a world tour of Australia, New Zealand, Egypt, France, Italy and England. While in England, Tener was chosen to help explain the game of baseball to the Prince of Wales, who would go on to become King Edward VII.

Tener was elected as Secretary of the Brotherhood of Professional Players, an early players union and served under President John Montgomery Ward, a future member of the Baseball Hall of Fame. In 1890, unhappy with baseball's reserve clause, Tener joined other players in jumping to the Players' League. Playing for the Pittsburgh Burghers, Tener compiled a poor 3–11 record. The league folded after one year and Tener decided to retire from professional baseball.

He entered the banking business in Charleroi, Pennsylvania, in 1891, becoming a cashier at the First National Bank of Charleroi. By 1897, he was the president of the bank. Over the years, Tener became a prominent business leader, founding the Charleroi Savings and Trust Company and the Mercantile Bridge Company.

== Political career ==
In 1908, Tener, a Republican, was elected to serve in the 61st United States Congress from Pennsylvania's 24th congressional district. As a former ballplayer, Tener organized the first Congressional Baseball Game which is now an annual tradition on Capitol Hill.

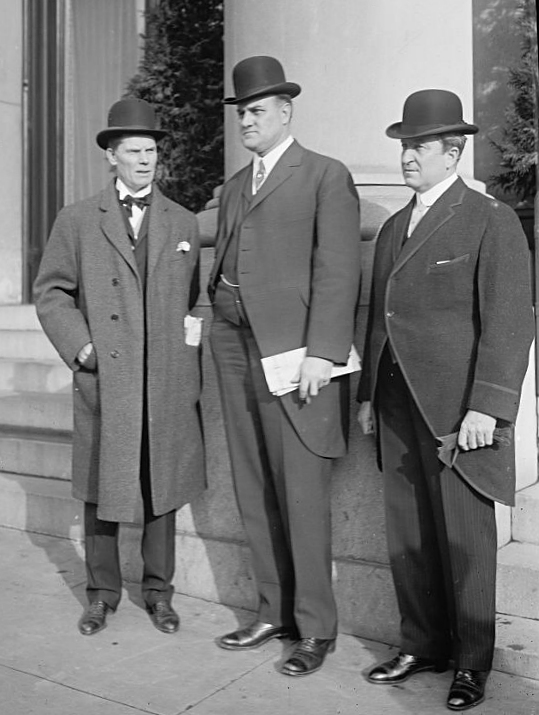
Governor Tener (center) with Governors John Dix and William Sulzer of New York

Tener planned to run for re-election in 1910. Instead, the Republican Party nominated Tener as its candidate for Governor where he would face a divided electorate. Pennsylvania experienced a scandal during the construction of the new Pennsylvania State Capitol. State Treasurer William H. Berry had found that there had been an unappropriated cost for the building's construction of over $7.7 million ($266,062,500 today), including a number of questionable charges. The scandal led to the conviction of the building architect and a former State Treasurer. Berry failed to get the Democratic nomination and broke away taking independent Republicans and Democrats to form his new Keystone Party.

Tener won the election with 415,614 votes (41.7%) over Berry with 382,127 (38.2%) with the help of a 45,000-vote victory in the City of Philadelphia. The Democratic candidate, State Senator Webster Grim of Doylestown, Pennsylvania, finished third with 13%. Governor Tener was the first Governor since the American Revolution to be born outside the United States and only the second in Pennsylvania's history to have been born outside of the state.

Tener's initiatives as governor included reforming the state public school system and the highway system. With schools, Tener signed into law the School Code of 1911, which established a State Board of Education empowered to set minimum standards and minimum salaries. The Code also mandated that all children regardless of race or color between the ages of eight and sixteen would be required to attend school.

The Governor also signed the Sproul Highway Bill into law, which gave the state responsibility over 9,000 public roads that counties and cities had previously maintained. Rebuffed by the voters for a bond issue to fund the program, Tener signed a bill designating fees from automobile registrations and drivers licenses to be used for road funding. In 1913, the Governor sign a bill requiring hunting licenses in Pennsylvania, using the fees generated by the licenses to fund conservation programs.

Tener also signed in to action in 1913 a bill that would lead to the creation of the Pennsylvania Historical Commission (PHC), which years later would be merged to form the Pennsylvania Historical and Museum Commission (PHMC). This would allow funding to be allocated to the preserve and protect the Commonwealths heritage through the Pennsylvania Historic Markers Program and the transfer of historic properties to PHC.

=== Electoral history ===
Pennsylvania's 24th congressional district election, 1908
| Party | Candidate | Votes | % |
|---|---|---|---|
| Republican | John K. Tener | 20,538 | 52.23 |
| Democratic | Charles H. Akens | 10,985 | 27.94 |
| Prohibition | Frank Fish | 5,982 | 15.21 |
| Socialist | Charles A. McKeever | 1,816 | 4.62 |
| Total votes | | 20,541 | 100 |
| Republican hold | | | |

Pennsylvania gubernatorial election, 1910
| Party | Candidate | Votes | % |
|---|---|---|---|
| Republican | John K. Tener | 412,658 | 41.33 |
| Workingmen's | John K. Tener | 2,956 | 0.3 |
| Total | John K. Tener | 415,614 | 41.63 |
| Keystone | William H. Berry | 382,127 | 38.27 |
| Democratic | Webster Grim | 129,395 | 12.96 |
| Socialist | John W. Slayton | 53,055 | 5.31 |
| Prohibition | Madison F. Larkin | 17,445 | 1.75 |
| Industrialist | George Anton | 802 | 0.08 |
| Total votes | | 998,448 | 100 |
| Republican hold | | | |

== Baseball executive ==
Tener maintained his interest in baseball after retiring as a player. In 1912, Governor Tener spoke out against gambling in baseball, and informed district attorneys around the state that he believed existing laws could be used against illegal wagering. He also offered the influence and assistance of the state government to support any district attorney who chose to act against wagering.

In 1913, Philadelphia Phillies owner William Baker proposed offering the position of National League president to Tener after the owners declined to extend the contract of president Thomas Lynch. Tener accepted the offer at a contract of $25,000 ($814,394 today) per year, but was not paid until April 1915 when his term as Governor expired.

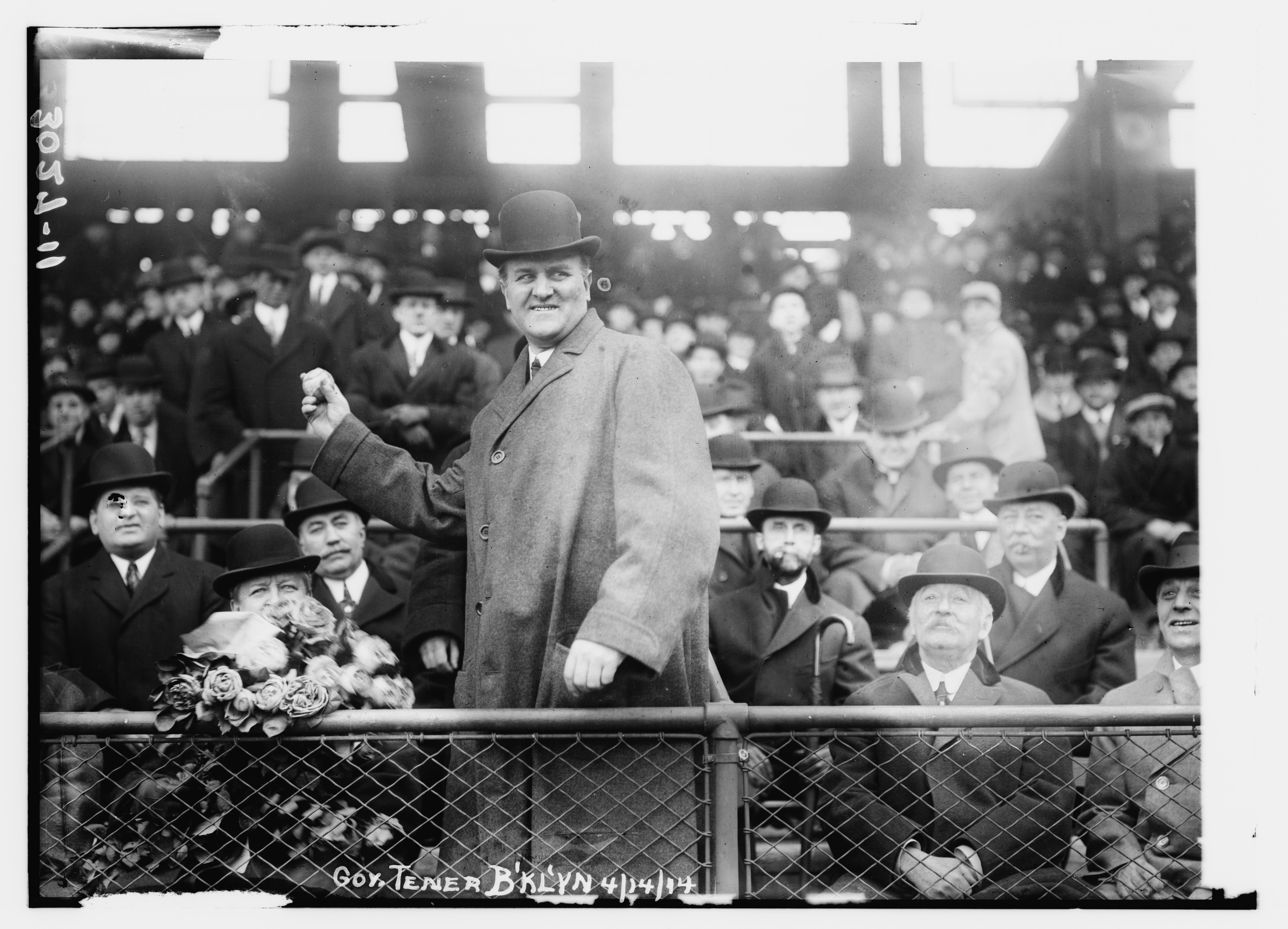
Tener throwing out the first ball at Ebbets Field on April 14, 1914

Early in his administration, Tener had his hands full as league president, serving a double role as Governor of Pennsylvania. The Federal League declared itself a major league and began competing for players in 1914. A number of players, including Joe Tinker, began jumping to the new league.

At the same time, Tener had to mediate a dispute between Chicago Cubs owner Charles Murphy and Cub manager and star player, Johnny Evers. Evers claimed that he had been fired by Murphy after a salary dispute. Murphy claimed in turn that the future hall-of-famer had resigned with the intent of jumping to the new Federal League. Murphy later attempted to broker a trade to the Boston Braves in which the Cubs would receive Boston star Bill Sweeney. The League originally ruled that Murphy had broken the terms of Evers's contract by not giving him ten days notice before the dismissal and that the punishment would be that Boston did not have to give the players to Chicago. This led to a protest by Murphy.

At the time, Murphy was not a well-regarded owner by his peers and the League was afraid that Evers would go to the Federal League to join his former teammate, Joe Tinker. The dispute gave the owners the opportunity to rid themselves of Murphy. Tener arranged for newspaper publisher Charles P. Taft, who was a minority shareholder and had helped the league to force out Phillies owner Horace Fogel, to buy the team and force Murphy out.

Tener later faced the prospect of players' strikes in 1914 and 1917. In 1914, the Baseball Players Fraternity, led by Dave Fultz threatened to strike over the transfer of Clarence Kraft to the minor leagues from the Brooklyn Robins. Brooklyn had tried to send Kraft to their minor league club in Newark, New Jersey, but the Nashville Vols claimed that they had the rights to Kraft. Going to Nashville would have cost Kraft $150 ($4,821 today) in salary. When baseball's National Commission ruled that Kraft had to report to Nashville, he appealed to Fultz for help. Although American League President Ban Johnson sought a confrontation, Tener brokered a deal in which Brooklyn paid for Kraft's rights and sent him to Newark.

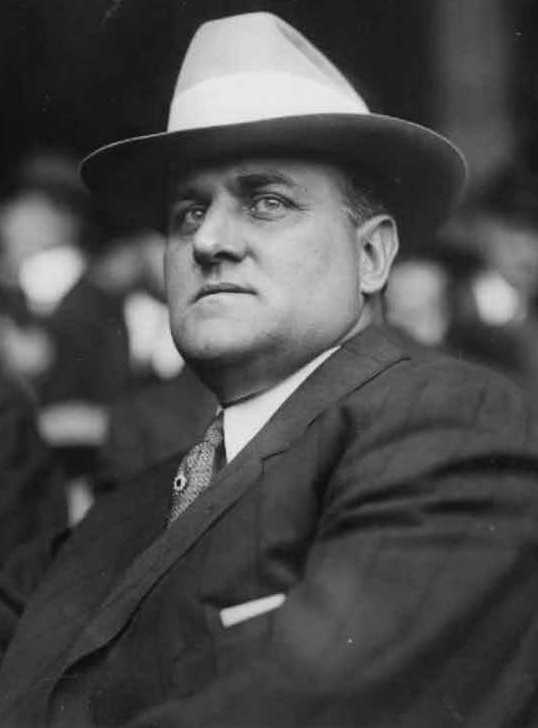
Tener photographed by Charles M. Conlon.

Tener ruled Benny Kauff ineligible to join the New York Giants baseball team in April 1915. Kauff played center field for the Giants on April 29, 1915. Tener said that Kauff, a member of the Brooklyn Tip-Tops of the Federal League, was a jumper from organized baseball. In order to play for New York of the National League, he needed formal reinstatement.

In 1917, Fultz, emboldened by his efforts in the Kraft cash presented a list of demands to the National Commission to improve the playing conditions in the minor leagues. Tener rejected three of the demands as they were unrelated to Major League Baseball and applied only to minor league players. Tener also noted that the fourth demand, that injured players be paid their full salaries, had already been met in the 1917 contract. Fultz went on to threaten to affiliate with the American Federation of Labor and to lead the players on a walkout if his demands were not met.

Even though Tener himself had been a member of the Brotherhood of Professional Players in his playing days and, as part of the National Commission, had initially certified the Player's Fraternity in 1914, he was not amused by the threats. On the labor side, AFL leader Samuel Gompers did not welcome the idea and many major leaguers were not interested in striking for the benefit of minor league players. The National Commission, immediately withdrew recognition from the Players' Fraternity. Afterwards, the Players' Fraternity membership declined and the organization ceased to exist.

In November 1917, Tener accepted a one-year contract extension, but was troubled by the infighting between the National League's owners. In 1918, the league became embroiled in a dispute with the American League over the rights to pitcher Scott Perry. Tener believed that Philadelphia Athletics owner Connie Mack had broken an agreement with both leagues by going to court over the matter. Tener demanded that the National League break off relations, which could have included cancelling the World Series. However, the owners did not support him and Tener resigned in August 1918.

== Later life ==
After leaving baseball, Tener returned to his business interests in Pittsburgh. In 1926, he tried to gain the Republican nomination to run again for Governor but was unsuccessful, finishing third at the convention. In the 1930s, Tener was elected as a director of the Philadelphia Phillies.

In 1935, Tener's wife Harriet died. In 1936, he married Leone Evans who died in 1937 after an illness. He engaged in the insurance business until his death, aged 82, in Pittsburgh in 1946.

He was interred in Homewood Cemetery in Pittsburgh.

Buildings named in his honor include a residence hall in the East Halls area of the University Park campus of the Pennsylvania State University and the Charleroi Public Library.

In 1999, the Pennsylvania Historical and Museum Commission installed a historical marker in Charleroi, noting Tener's historic importance.

== See also ==
- Congressional Baseball Game
- List of American sportsperson-politicians
- List of Major League Baseball players from Ireland
- List of United States governors born outside the United States

U.S. House of Representatives
| Preceded by Ernest Acheson | Member of the U.S. House of Representatives from Pennsylvania's 24th congressional district 1909–1911 | Succeeded by Charles Matthews |
Political offices
| Preceded by Edwin Sydney Stuart | Governor of Pennsylvania; 1911–1915 | Succeeded by Martin Brumbaugh |
Party political offices
| Preceded by Edwin Sydney Stuart | Republican nominee for Governor of Pennsylvania; 1910 | Succeeded by Martin Brumbaugh |
