= Teber =

Teber is a surname. Notable people with the surname include:

- Selim Teber (born 1981), German footballer of Turkish ancestry
- Ergün Teber (born 1985), Turkish footballer
- Mine Teber (born 1961), Turkish-Cypriot actress

== See also ==
- Heber (given name)
- Taber (surname)
- Tener
