= Harry Pulliam =

American baseball executive (1869–1909)

Harry Clay Pulliam
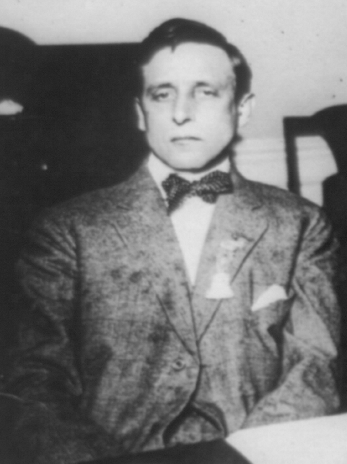
- Pulliam in 1909
- Born: February 9, 1869; Scottsville, Kentucky, U.S.
- Died: July 29, 1909 (aged 40); New York City, New York, U.S.
- Resting place: Cave Hill Cemetery; Louisville, Kentucky, U.S.
- Education: University of Virginia School of Law (JD)
- Occupation: MLB Executive
- Political party: Democrat

Harry Clay Pulliam (February 9, 1869 – July 29, 1909) was an American baseball executive who served as the sixth President of the National League. He served from 1903 until his death in 1909. He was president during the period in which the National League and the fledgling American League settled their hostilities and formed a National Agreement which led to the creation of the World Series.

== Biography ==
Harry Clay Pulliam was born on February 9, 1869, in Scottsville, Kentucky. Early in his life, his father, a tobacco businessman, moved the family to Louisville, where he attended public schools. Pulliam received his Juris Doctor degree from the University of Virginia School of Law.

In the late 1880s, after working for newspapers in California, Pulliam became a reporter for the Louisville Commercial, He quickly advanced through the ranks, and was considered one of the leading authorities on the game and history of baseball. Soon after receiving a promotion to City Editor of the Commercial, he met the owner of the Louisville Colonels, Barney Dreyfuss. Dreyfuss liked Pulliam and hired him away from the newspaper, appointing him to the position of club secretary in 1890. In 1897, Dreyfuss promoted Pulliam to club president. Pulliam negotiated an ownership position of the Colonels. There he selected Honus Wagner as a player.

When the National League contracted from 12 to eight teams in 1899, the Louisville Colonels were dropped from the league. Dreyfuss purchased interest in the Pittsburgh Pirates and brought Pulliam with him to Pittsburgh. Through the efforts of Dreyfuss and Pulliam, Wagner and other key Louisville players moved to the Pirates as well. In his book, Wagner credited Pulliam with arranging for him to stay with Pittsburgh and not leave for another franchise. Wagner stayed with Pittsburgh until retirement.

Pulliam was unanimously elected president of the National League in December 1902.

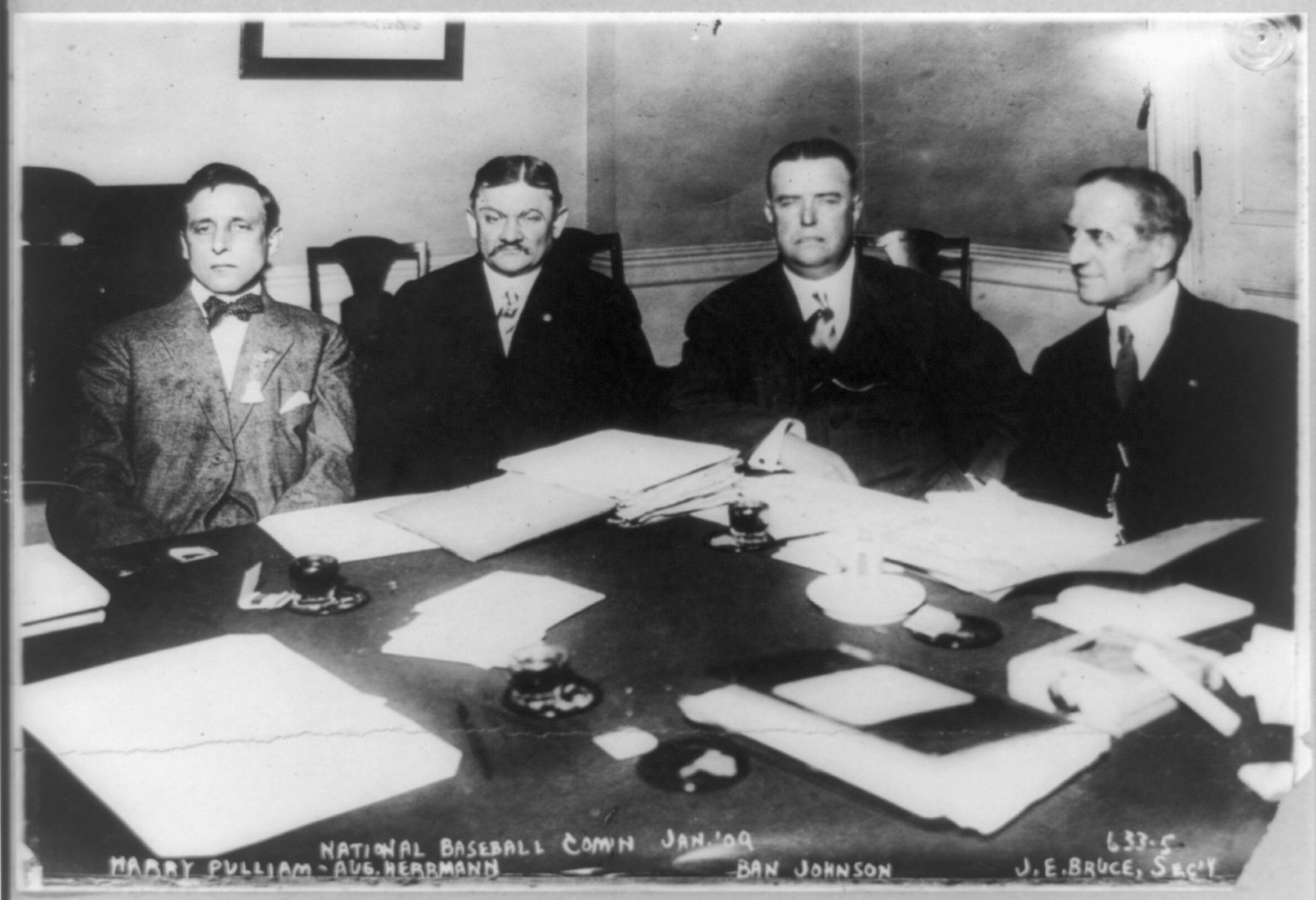
The National Baseball Commission in 1909: Pulliam (far left), August Herrmann (middle left), Ban Johnson (middle right), and John E. Bruce (far right)

Pulliam's most controversial decision came late in the 1908 season, following a game between the New York Giants and Chicago Cubs in which Giants first baseman Fred Merkle (at 19 the youngest player in the Major Leagues), standing on first base, saw his team score a run to win the game and became so excited that he failed to step on second base, thus nullifying the run and leaving the game tied. The excited spectators ran onto the field in joy, thinking the Giants had won. Home plate umpire Hank O'Day deemed it impossible to restore order on the field to resume the game, and ruled that the run did not count. Due to darkness, the game was declared a tie. His decision was submitted to the league president, Pulliam, who agreed with the umpires. The play was reviewed by the National League Board of Directors during a special session held in Cincinnati. The board's report issued on October 6, 1908, upheld Pulliam's decision and unsparingly castigated Merkle for his "stupid play"—a "reckless, careless, inexcusable blunder." The game was later replayed (due to the Giants and Cubs finishing the season with identical records atop the National League), with the Cubs winning to capture the pennant. They went on to win the World Series that year, and Merkle has been blamed for the loss ever since. The pressure of the 1908 decision resulted in Pulliam taking several months off, and his discussion of retirement.

== Death ==
Pulliam shot himself in the head in his apartment at the New York Athletic Club at 9:30 pm on July 29, 1909. He lingered for several hours before dying. He was depressed over his ill health.

Pulliam was buried at Cave Hill Cemetery, Louisville, Kentucky. Baseball was halted in both the American and National Leagues for the first time in baseball history on the day he was buried. A special baseball card was created in his honor and distributed at the World Series. He was the first person honored by baseball with all players wearing armbands for 30 days.

== Legacy ==
Pulliam's level of admiration and importance to baseball can best be described by those in attendance at his funeral. The honorary pallbearers included Ban Johnson, president of the American League; John Heydler, secretary and treasurer of the National League (subsequently succeeding Pulliam as President); the secretary of the National Baseball Commission, and the presidents of the Pirates, St. Louis Cardinals, Brooklyn Dodgers and Philadelphia Phillies. Pulliam's axiom "Take Nothing For Granted In Baseball" is still used this day. In fact, this quote of Pulliam's was printed in a New York Times article in 1922, thirteen years after his death.

Upon Pulliam's death, organized baseball passed an amendment that each year on the first day of the World Series, a special honorary baseball card with his likeness be distributed to everyone involved with the baseball organization and that flowers be delivered to his grave on that same day. This tribute continued until the late 1920s. In its amendment, the baseball commission wrote, "Organized baseball never had a more zealous and devoted sponsor."

== Politics ==
In 1897, while President of the Louisville Colonels, Pulliam was nominated as a Democratic Kentucky legislator for his ward in Louisville. He was nominated while on the road for the Colonels and did not campaign for the position. He was elected, and served the sixth and seventh wards of Louisville. Later, he received the title of "Red Bird Statesman" for the introduction of a bill to protect the species.

== In popular culture ==
Harry Pulliam is a central character in the historical novel Called Out: A novel of base ball and America in 1908 by Floyd Sullivan (Amika Press, 2017), which features a fictionalized account of the key events of his life and death during the years 1908 and 1909.

Preceded by Nicholas Young	National League president 1903 – 1909	Succeeded by John Heydler
