= Ban Johnson =

American baseball executive (1864-1931)

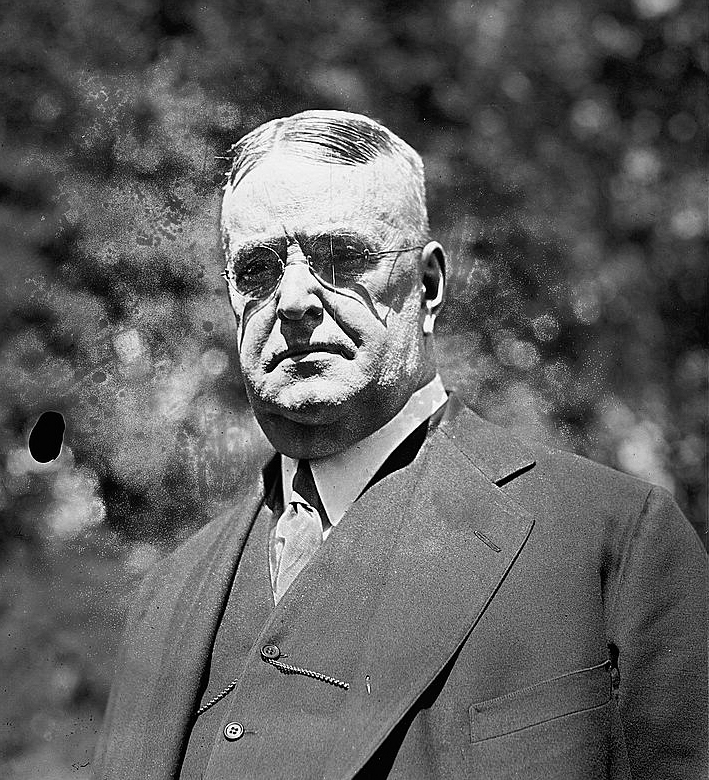
- Johnson in 1921
- Born: January 5, 1864; Norwalk, Ohio, U.S.
- Died: March 28, 1931 (aged 67); St. Louis, Missouri, U.S.
- Occupations: American League president
- Baseball career

Member of the National

Baseball Hall of Fame
- Induction: 1937
- Election method: Centennial Commission

Byron Bancroft "Ban" Johnson (January 5, 1864 – March 28, 1931) was an American executive in professional baseball who served as the founder and first president of the American League (AL).

Johnson developed the AL—a descendant of the minor league Western League—into a "clean" alternative to the National League, which had become notorious for its rough-and-tumble atmosphere. To encourage a more orderly environment, Johnson strongly supported the new league's umpires, which eventually included Hall of Famer Billy Evans.

With the help of league owners and managers such as Charles Comiskey, Charles Somers and Jimmy McAleer, Johnson lured top talent to the AL, which soon rivaled the more established National League. Johnson dominated the AL until the mid-1920s, when a public dispute with baseball commissioner Kenesaw Mountain Landis culminated in his forced resignation as league president.

== The Western League ==
Johnson was born in 1864 in Norwalk, Ohio. He studied law at Marietta College, although he never received a degree. He eventually became the sports editor of a newspaper in Cincinnati. During this time, Johnson befriended Charles Comiskey, who was then manager of the Cincinnati Reds. At the urging of Comiskey and Reds owner John T. Brush, Johnson was elected as president of the Western League, a faltering minor league, at a reorganization meeting held in 1894.

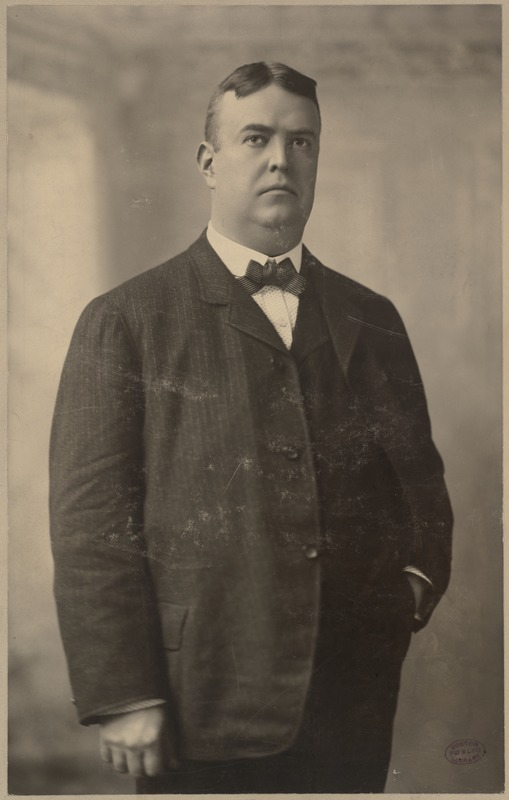
Ban Johnson, President, American League, [ca. 1910]. Michael T. "Nuf Ced" McGreevy Collection, Boston Public Library

Johnson had criticized the National League for its rowdy atmosphere, which was driving away families and women. He set about making baseball more friendly to both. Contrary to the practice of the time, Johnson gave his umpires unqualified support and had little tolerance for players or managers who failed to show them due respect. Johnson also fined and suspended players who used foul language on the field. Soon, the Western League was recognized as not only the strongest minor league, but also as the most effectively managed league in all of baseball.

== Formation of the American League ==
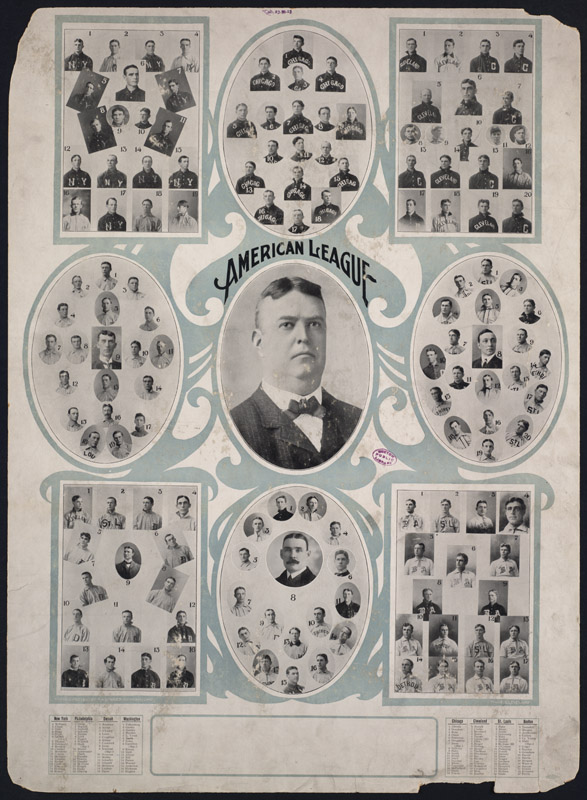
Ban Johnson (center) surrounded by the individual portraits of the eight American League teams

Johnson, however, had a bigger plan—another major league. With the help of Comiskey, who had purchased the Sioux City franchise and moved it to St. Paul in 1894 after leaving the Reds, Johnson initiated an ambitious plan of expansion. He got his chance after the 1899 season, when the National League dropped teams in Baltimore, Cleveland, Louisville and Washington, D.C. Johnson moved the Grand Rapids franchise to Cleveland, where they would eventually become the Indians. He also had Comiskey move his Saint Paul team to Chicago, where they eventually became the White Sox. The latter move was made with the blessing of the NL, which saw Comiskey's team as a way to head off any attempt to revive the American Association. For the 1900 season, the Western League was renamed as the American League, although it remained a minor league.

The 1900 season was an unequivocal success, and Johnson received a 10-year contract extension. In October, he withdrew the AL from the National Agreement (the formal understanding between the NL and the minor leagues). The final step came on January 28, 1901, when he declared the AL would operate as a major league. He then placed teams in Baltimore, Boston, Philadelphia and Washington.

The Buffalo Bisons were to be a member of the new American League and their manager Franklin was told right up to January 29, 1901, that "Buffalo was in the league and not to worry." Johnson then unceremoniously dumped Buffalo and placed the franchise in Boston. It was later revealed that he not only had been negotiating surreptitiously with Boston people for several months, but also that he had money invested in the Boston franchise. Johnson also had a large stake in the Washington franchise, which he kept until 1903.

== A baseball power ==
In 1901, the NL made a critical blunder by limiting player salaries to $2,400 per year (equivalent to $93,000 in 2025), a relatively small sum in light of the increasing popularity of baseball. Johnson, Comiskey and the other AL owners responded by raiding NL rosters and promising disgruntled players much higher salaries. Over 100 players "jumped" to the new league. After a two-year war in which the AL trounced the NL in attendance both seasons, the NL sued for peace. Under a new National Agreement, the AL was formally recognized as the second major league. A three-man National Commission was set up, composed of both league presidents and Reds owner Garry Herrmann. Although Herrmann was nominal president of the commission, Johnson soon dominated the body.

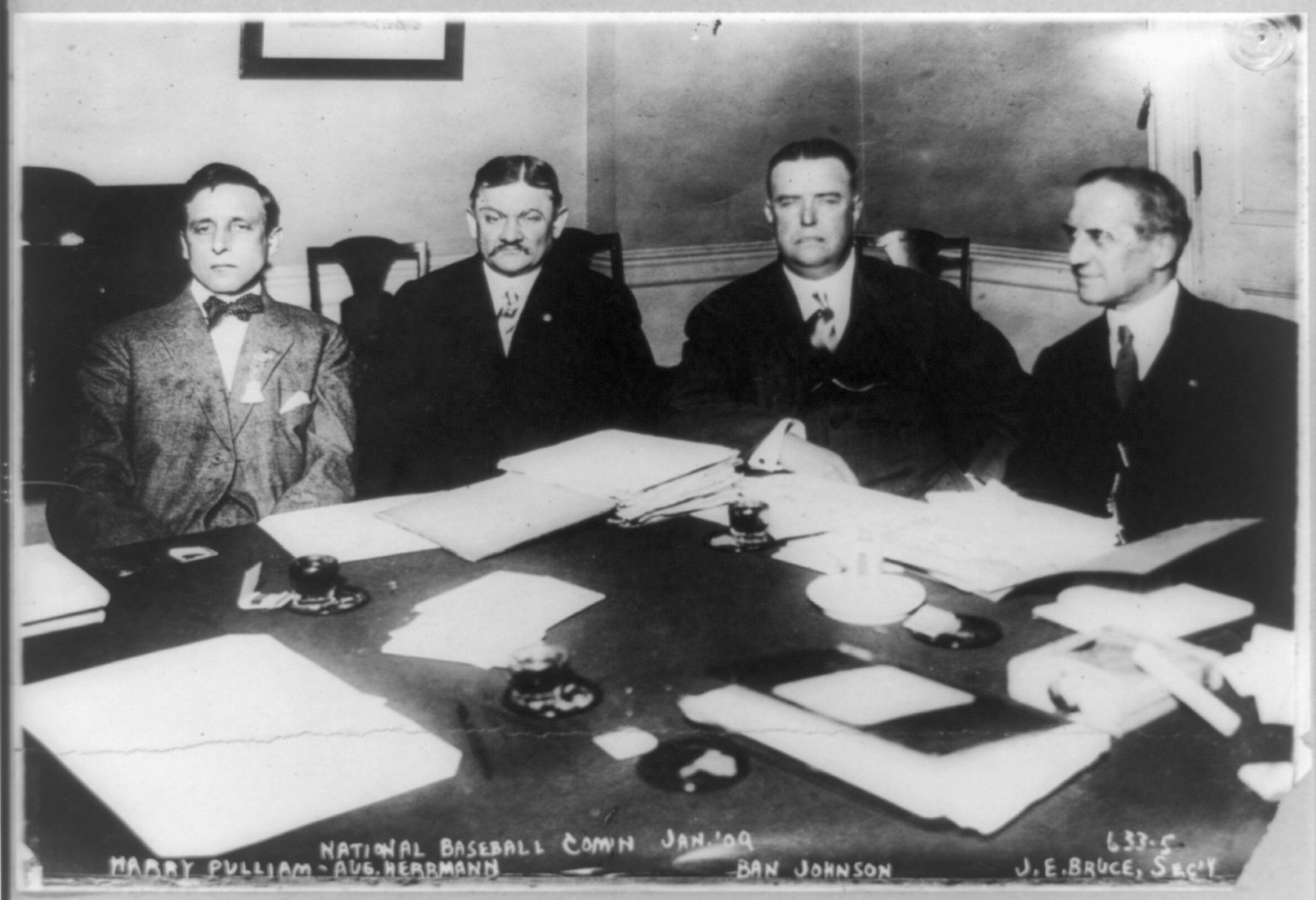
The National Baseball Commission in 1909: Harry Pulliam (far left), August Herrmann (middle left), Johnson (middle right), and John E. Bruce (far right)

Johnson did not tolerate criticism, and made it very difficult for men he didn't like to buy into the league. For instance, when Harry Frazee bought the Boston Red Sox in 1917, Johnson tried almost from the start to drive him out because Frazee had not been hand-picked by Johnson. At one point, Johnson even had ownership interests in the Cleveland and Washington teams.

== Downfall ==
The Frazee dispute planted the seed for Johnson's downfall. Eventually, the league divided into two factions, with the Red Sox, White Sox and New York Yankees on one side (commonly known as "The Insurrectos") and the other five clubs (the Indians, Philadelphia Athletics, St. Louis Browns, Detroit Tigers and Washington Senators, known as the "Loyal Five") on the other. By this time, Comiskey had become a bitter enemy of Johnson; the two men's once warm friendship had strained considerably. Johnson's authority eroded further that year when the Red Sox traded Carl Mays to the Yankees in defiance of a Johnson order to suspend him after Mays had jumped the club. The Yankees went to court and received an injunction to allow Mays to play, as Johnson had demonstrated throughout the proceedings that his investment in the Cleveland Indians hindered his ability to be impartial.

The final nail in Johnson's coffin proved to be the Black Sox Scandal. Johnson paid no attention to Comiskey's claims that his White Sox may have been on the take from gamblers. However, when the scandal broke after the 1920 season, the White Sox, Red Sox and Yankees threatened to pull out of the AL and join a new 12-team National League. The enlarged league would include a new team in Detroit unrelated to the Tigers, who were owned by Johnson loyalist Frank Navin. However, Navin was in no mood for another war and persuaded the other five clubs to agree to appoint a new National Commission of non-baseball men. Federal District Court Judge Kenesaw Mountain Landis was appointed as chairman. However, Landis would accept an appointment only as sole Commissioner of Baseball, with unlimited power over the game. The owners were still reeling from the damage to baseball's reputation due to the Black Sox Scandal, and readily agreed to Landis' demands.

Under the circumstances, a clash between the iron-willed Johnson and the iron-willed Landis was inevitable, and it happened prior to the 1924 World Series. Landis banned two New York Giants from the Series for attempting to bribe members of the Philadelphia Phillies late in the season. After Frankie Frisch and two other Giants stars were implicated, only to be cleared by Landis, Johnson demanded that the Series be canceled. He publicly criticized Landis for his handling of the affair, and Landis threatened to resign if the AL owners didn't rein Johnson in. After the Series, the AL owners promised to remove Johnson from office if he stepped out of line again. Johnson remained on good behavior for two years, even getting an extension of his contract to 1935 and a raise to $40,000 (he had previously made $25,000).

However, in 1926, Johnson criticized Landis for granting Ty Cobb and Tris Speaker an amnesty after evidence surfaced that they had fixed a game in 1919. Landis demanded that the AL choose between him and Johnson. The AL owners were prepared to remove Johnson from office at their annual meeting in January 1927. Because Johnson was in ill health at the time, the owners decided to put him on an indefinite sabbatical instead. Johnson tried to return in the spring and acted as if nothing had changed. However, the situation had become untenable, and Johnson was forced to resign at the end of the season. Frank Navin served as acting president of the American League until the owners selected Indians general manager Ernest Barnard as president.

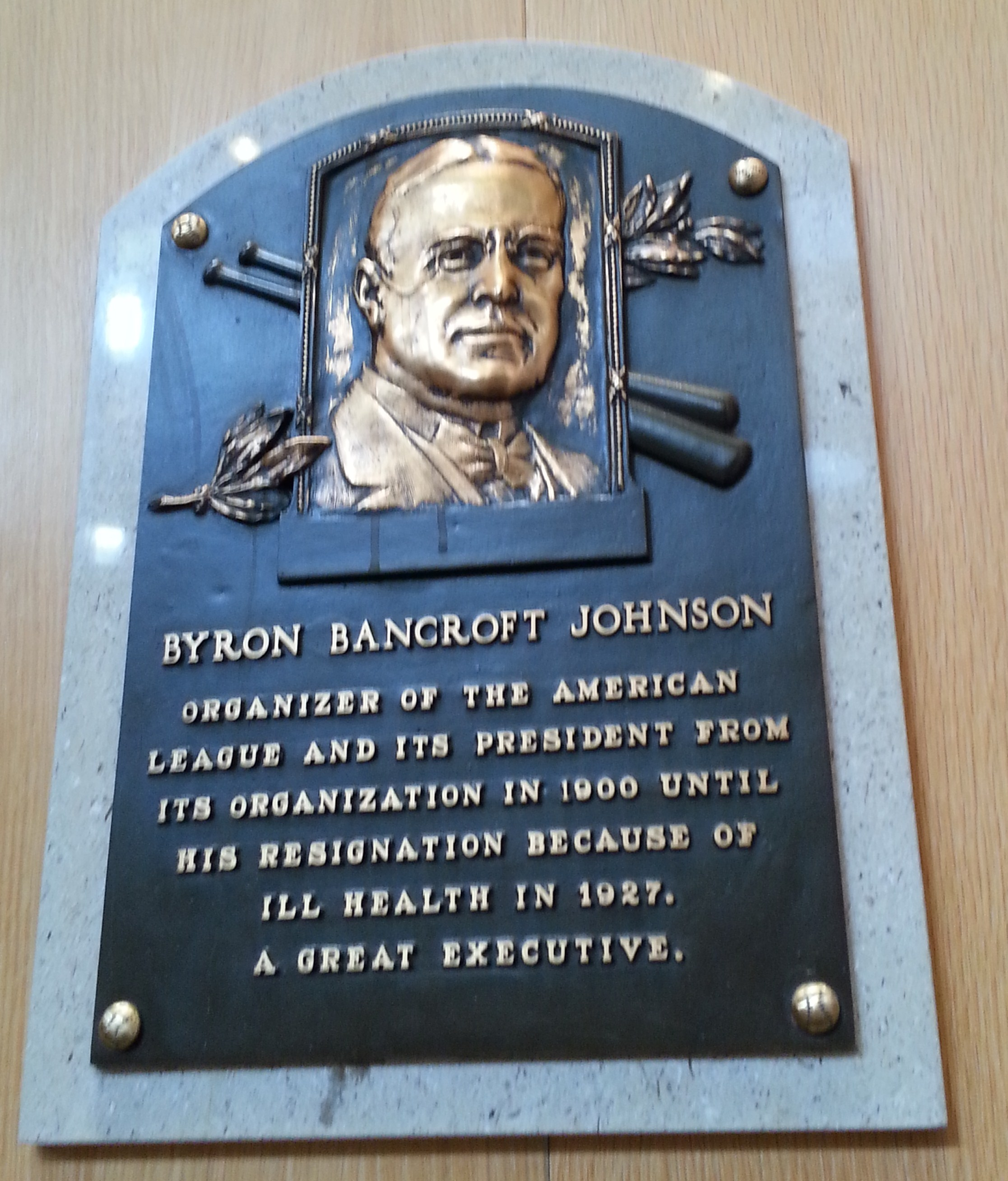
Johnson's plaque at the Baseball Hall of Fame

== Legacy ==
Johnson died on March 28, 1931, at age 67, in St. Louis, Missouri, just a few hours after his successor, Ernest Barnard. Johnson was elected to the Baseball Hall of Fame in 1937 as one of its charter members. The athletic fieldhouse at Marietta College is named in his honor. He was laid to rest at Riverside Cemetery in Spencer, Indiana.

Will Harridge, who succeeded to the AL presidency in 1931, summed up Johnson's legacy: "He was the most brilliant man the game has ever known. He was more responsible for making baseball the national game than anyone in the history of the sport".

The Jayhawk Collegiate League's Liberal Bee Jays are named in Johnson's honor.
