= Thomas Lynch (baseball executive) =

American baseball umpire and executive

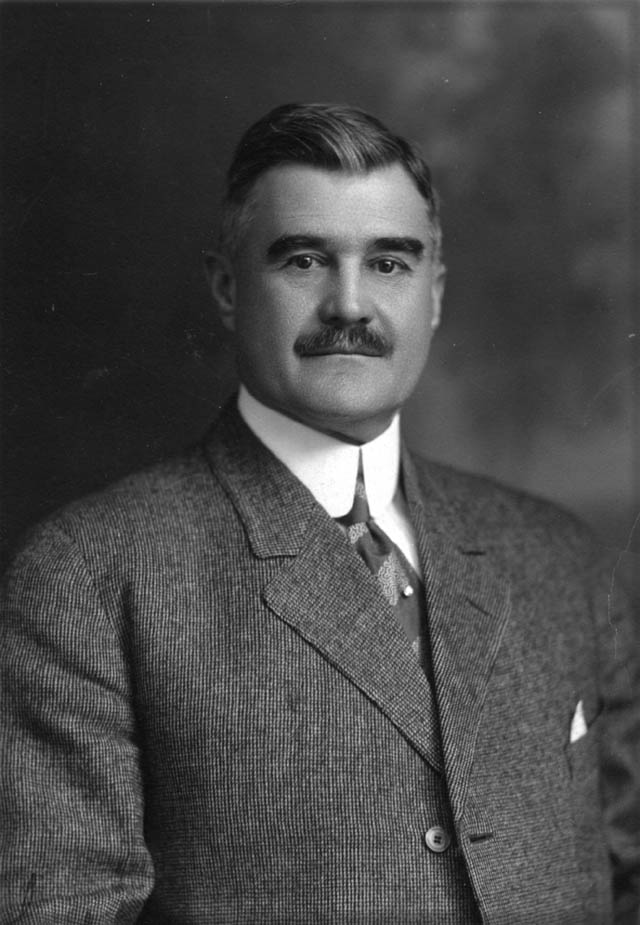
- Thomas Lynch as National League president
- Born: 1859; New Britain, Connecticut, U.S.
- Died: February 27, 1924 (aged 64–65); Hartford, Connecticut, U.S.
- Occupations: Umpire, National League president

Thomas J. Lynch (1859 – February 27, 1924) was an American umpire in Major League Baseball for 13 seasons, all of which were in the National League (NL), between the years of 1888 and 1902. Known as an honest, but sometimes brash umpire, he later became NL president in 1910 as a compromise among the major league owners. Although his time as league president was considered uneventful, he was replaced following the 1913 season.

In 1946 Lynch had been named to the Honor Rolls of Baseball by the National Baseball Hall of Fame.

Preceded by John Heydler	National League president 1910 – 1913	Succeeded by John K. Tener
