= Wieber =

Wieber is a German surname, a variant of Weber. Notable people with the surname include:

- Jordyn Wieber (born 1995), American gymnast
- Ryan Wieber (born 1984), American visual effects compositor
