= National League (baseball) =

League within Major League Baseball

- Sport: Baseball
- Founded: February 2, 1876; 150 years ago in New York City, New York
- Founder: William Hulbert; Albert Spalding
- Divisions: 3
- No. of teams: 15
- Country: United States
- Most recent champion: Milwaukee Brewers (1st title) (2026)
- Most titles: Los Angeles Dodgers (26)

The National League of Professional Baseball Clubs, known simply as the National League (NL), is the older of two leagues constituting Major League Baseball (MLB) in the United States and Canada, and the world's oldest extant professional team sports league. Founded on February 2, 1876, to replace the National Association of Professional Base Ball Players (NAPBBP) of 1871–1875 (often called simply the "National Association"), the NL is sometimes called the Senior Circuit, in contrast to MLB's other league, the American League, which was founded 25 years later and is called the "Junior Circuit". Each league has 15 teams.

The National League survived competition from various other professional baseball leagues during the late 19th century. Most did not last for more than a few seasons, with a handful of teams joining the NL once their leagues folded. The American League declared itself a second major league in 1901, and the AL and NL engaged in a "baseball war" during 1901 and 1902 before agreeing to a "peace pact" that recognized each other as legitimate "major leagues". As part of this agreement, the leagues agreed to respect player contracts, establish rules about relationships with minor league clubs, and allow their champions to meet in a "World Series" to decide the overall professional baseball championship. National League teams have won 53 of the 122 World Series championships contested from 1903 to 2026.

For decades, Major League baseball clubs only played teams from their own league during the regular season and most of the playoffs, with only their champions facing off in the World Series. This separation gradually caused the leagues to develop slightly different strategies and styles of play. The National League was long considered the more "traditional" league, a reputation most exemplified by the NL's more prevalent use of "smallball" tactics and lack of a designated hitter rule, which the AL implemented in 1973. However, with the advent of free agency in the 1970s allowing for more player movement between leagues, and the introduction of regular season interleague play in 1997, the difference in play between the two major leagues has diminished considerably. The NL's adoption of the designated hitter rule in 2022, and the expansion of interleague play to 46 games beginning in 2023, has further blurred the lines between leagues.

Though both leagues agreed to be jointly governed by a commissioner in 1920; they remained separate legal and business entities with their own president and management. This was the case until after the 1999 season, when the National League legally merged with the American League under the auspices of Major League Baseball, which has since operated much like other North American professional sports leagues, albeit with two "leagues" instead of "conferences".

== History ==
=== Foundation ===
By 1875, the National Association of Professional Base Ball Players (NAPBBP, often referred to as the "National Association"), founded four years earlier, was suffering from a lack of strong authority over clubs, unsupervised scheduling, unstable membership of cities, dominance by one team (the Boston Red Stockings), and an extremely low entry fee ($10) that gave clubs no incentive to abide by league rules when it was inconvenient to them.

William A. Hulbert (1832–1882), a Chicago businessman and an officer of the Chicago White Stockings of 1870–1889, approached several NA clubs with the plans for a professional league for the sport of baseball with a stronger central authority and exclusive territories in larger cities only. Additionally, Hulbert had a problem: five of his star players were threatened with expulsion from the NAPBBP because Hulbert had signed them to his club using what were considered questionable means. Hulbert had a great vested interest in creating his own league, and after recruiting St. Louis privately, four western clubs met in Louisville, Kentucky, in January 1876. With Hulbert speaking for the five later in New York City on February 2, 1876, the National League of Professional Base Ball Clubs was established with eight charter members, as follows:

- Chicago ("Chicago White Stockings") (according to The Baseball Encyclopedia's retroactive naming convention) from the NA (now the Chicago Cubs, not to be confused with the current Chicago White Sox of the American League)
- Athletic Club of Philadelphia ("Philadelphia Athletics") from the NA (expelled after the 1876 season)
- Boston ("Boston Red Stockings"), the dominant team in the NA (later the Boston Braves, then the Milwaukee Braves, now the Atlanta Braves, not to be confused with the present-day Boston Red Sox of the later American League)
- Hartford ("Hartford Dark Blues") from the NA (folded after the 1877 season)
- Mutual Club of New York ("New York Mutuals") from the NA (expelled after the 1876 season)
- St. Louis ("St. Louis Brown Stockings") from the NA (folded after the 1877 season, having committed to Louisville Stars for 1878)
- Cincinnati ("Cincinnati Reds"), a new franchise (disbanded after the 1879 season)
- Louisville ("Louisville Grays"), a new franchise (folded after the 1877 season when four players were banned for gambling)

The National League's formation meant the end of the old National Association after only five seasons, as its remaining clubs shut down or reverted to amateur or minor league status. The only strong club from 1875 excluded in 1876 was a second one in Philadelphia, often called the White Stockings or later Phillies.

The first game in National League history was played on April 22, 1876, at Philadelphia's Jefferson Street Grounds, at 25th & Jefferson Streets, between the Philadelphia Athletics and the Boston baseball club. Boston won the game 6–5.

The new league's authority was soon tested after the first season. The Athletic and Mutual clubs fell behind in the standings and refused to make western road trips late in the season, preferring to play games against local non-league competition to recoup some of their financial losses rather than travel extensively incurring more costs. Hulbert reacted to the clubs' defiance by expelling them, an act which not only shocked baseball followers and the sports world (since New York and Philadelphia were the two most populous cities in the league), but made it clear to clubs that league scheduling commitments, a cornerstone of competitive integrity, were not to be ignored.

The National League operated with only six clubs during 1877 and 1878. Over the next several years, various teams joined and left the struggling league. By 1880, six of the eight charter members had folded. The two remaining original NL franchises, Boston and Chicago, remain still in operation today as the Atlanta Braves and the Chicago Cubs. When all eight participants for 1881 returned for 1882—the first off-season without turnover in membership—the "circuit" consisted of a zig-zag line connecting the eight cities: Chicago, Detroit, Cleveland, Buffalo, Troy (near the state capital of Albany, New York), Worcester (Massachusetts), Boston, and Providence.

In 1883, new New York and Philadelphia clubs began National League play. Both teams remain in the NL today, the Phillies in their original city and the New York franchise (later named Giants) now in San Francisco since 1958.

=== Competition with other leagues ===
The NL encountered its first strong rival organization when the American Association began play in 1882. The AA played in cities where the NL did not have teams, offered Sunday games and alcoholic beverages in locales where permitted, and sold cheaper tickets everywhere (25 cents versus the NL's standard 50 cents, a hefty sum for many in 1882). The NL struck back by establishing new clubs in 1883 in AA cities Philadelphia (later called "Phillies") and New York (the team that would become the Giants).

The National League and the American Association participated in a version of the World Series seven times during their ten-year coexistence. These contests were less organized than the modern Series, lasting as few as three games and as many as fifteen, with two Series (1885 and 1890) ending in disputed ties. The NL won four times and the AA only once, in 1886.

Starting with the Pittsburgh Pirates in 1887, the National League began to raid the American Association for franchises to replace NL teams that folded. This undercut the stability of the AA.

Other new leagues that rose to compete with the National League were the Union Association and the Players' League. The Union Association was established in 1884 and folded after playing only one season, its league champion St. Louis Maroons joining the NL. The Players' League was established in 1890 by the Brotherhood of Professional Base-Ball Players, the sport's first players' union, which had failed to persuade the NL to modify its labor practices, including a salary cap and a reserve clause that bound players to their teams indefinitely. The NL suffered many defections of star players to the Players' League, but the P.L. collapsed after one season. The Brooklyn, Chicago, Pittsburgh, and New York franchises of the NL absorbed their Players' League counterparts.

=== Expansion (1887–1899) ===
The labor strike of 1890 hastened the downfall of the American Association. After the 1891 season, the AA disbanded and merged with the NL, which became known legally for the next decade as the "National League and American Association". The teams now known as the Cincinnati Reds, Los Angeles Dodgers (originally Brooklyn) and Pittsburgh Pirates (as well as the now-defunct Cleveland Spiders) had already switched from the AA to the NL prior to 1892. With the merger, the NL absorbed the St. Louis Browns (now known as the St. Louis Cardinals), along with three other teams that did not survive into the 20th century—the Baltimore Orioles (not the current MLB team), Louisville Colonels, and Washington Statesmen.

While four teams that moved from the AA remain in the NL today (Pittsburgh [1887], Cincinnati [1890], Los Angeles [originally Brooklyn; 1890], and St. Louis [1892]), only two original NL franchises (1876) remain in the league: the Chicago Cubs and the Atlanta Braves (originally in Boston, and later Milwaukee). The Cubs are the only charter member to play continuously in the same city. The other two pre-1892 teams still in the league are the Philadelphia Phillies and the San Francisco Giants (originally New York), both of which joined in 1883.

The National League became a 12-team circuit with monopoly status for the rest of the decade. The league became embroiled in numerous internal conflicts, not the least of which was a plan supported by some owners (and bitterly opposed by others) to form a "trust", wherein there would be one common ownership of all twelve teams. The NL used its monopsony power to force a $2,400 ($89,000 today) limit on annual player wages in 1894.

As the 20th century dawned, the NL was in trouble. Conduct among players was poor, and fistfights were a common sight at games. In addition to fighting each other, they fought with the umpires and often filled the air at games with foul language and obscenities. A game between the Orioles and Boston Beaneaters in 1894 ended up having tragic consequences when players became engaged in a brawl and a fire started under the stands of the South End Grounds. The blaze quickly got out of hand and swept through downtown Boston, destroying around 200 buildings. Team owners argued with each other, and players hated the NL's $2,400 salary cap. Many teams also ran into trouble with city governments that forbade recreational activities on Sunday.

Billy Sunday, a prominent outfielder in the 1880s, became so disgusted with the behavior of teammates that he quit playing in 1891 to become one of America's most famous evangelical Christian preachers. Most fans appear to have felt the same way, because attendance at games was plummeting by 1900.

=== Partnership with the American League ===
After eight seasons as a 12-team league, the NL contracted back to eight teams for the 1900 season, eliminating its teams in Baltimore, Cleveland, Louisville (which has never had another major league team since), and Washington. This provided an opportunity for competition. Three of those cities received franchises in the newly christened American League (AL) when the minor Western League changed its name to the AL in 1900, with the approval of the NL, which regarded the AL as a lesser league since they were a party to the National Agreement. The AL declined to renew its National Agreement membership when it expired the next year, and on January 28, 1901, the AL officially declared itself a second major league in competition with the NL. By 1903, the upstart AL had placed new teams in the National League cities of Boston, Chicago, New York, Philadelphia, and St. Louis, as well as the "abandoned" NL cities Cleveland and Washington (and, temporarily, Baltimore). Only the Cincinnati Reds and Pittsburgh Pirates had no AL team in their markets. The AL among other things enforced a strict conduct policy among its players.

The National League at first refused to recognize the new league, but reality set in as talent and money was split between the two leagues, diluting the league and decreasing financial success. After two years of bitter contention, a new version of the National Agreement was signed in 1903. This meant formal acceptance of each league by the other as an equal partner in major-league baseball, mutual respect of player contracts, and an agreement to play a postseason championship—the World Series.

Major League Baseball narrowly averted radical reorganization in November 1920. Dissatisfied with American League President and National Baseball Commission head Ban Johnson, NL owners dissolved the league on November 8 during heated talks on MLB reorganization in the wake of the Black Sox Scandal. Simultaneously, three AL teams also hostile to Johnson (Boston Red Sox, Chicago White Sox, and New York Yankees) withdrew from the AL and joined the eight NL teams in forming a new National League; the 12th team would be whichever of the remaining five AL teams loyal to Johnson first chose to join; if none did so an expansion team would have been placed in Detroit, by far the largest one-team city at that time. Four days later, on November 12, both sides met (without Johnson) and agreed to restore the two leagues and replace the ineffective National Commission with a one-man Commissioner in the person of federal Judge Kenesaw Mountain Landis.

The National League circuit remained unchanged from 1900 through 1952. In 1953 the Braves moved from Boston to Milwaukee; in 1966 they moved again, to Atlanta. In 1958 the Brooklyn Dodgers and the New York Giants moved to Los Angeles and San Francisco, respectively, bringing major league baseball to the West Coast of the U.S. for the first time.

=== Divisional reorganization ===
The NL remained an eight-team league for over 60 years. (For the eight teams, see Expansion (1887–1899) above, and "Classic Eight" below.) In 1962—facing competition from the proposed Continental League and confronted by the American League's unilateral expansion in 1961—the NL expanded by adding the New York Mets and the Houston Colt .45s. The "Colts" were renamed the Houston Astros three years later. In 1969, the league added the San Diego Padres and the Montreal Expos (now the Washington Nationals), becoming a 12-team league for the first time since 1899.

In 1969, as a result of its expansion to 12 teams, the National League—which for its first 93 years had competed equally in a single grouping—was reorganized into two divisions of six teams (respectively named the National League East and West, although geographically it was more like North and South), with the division champions meeting in the National League Championship Series (an additional round of postseason competition) for the right to advance to the World Series.

In 1993 the league expanded to 14 teams, adding the Colorado Rockies and the Florida Marlins (which became the Miami Marlins shortly after the end of the 2011 season). In 1998, the Arizona Diamondbacks became the league's fifteenth franchise, and the Milwaukee Brewers moved from the AL to the NL, giving the NL 16 teams for the next 15 seasons.

In 1994, the league was again reorganized, into three geographical divisions (East, West and Central, all currently with five teams; from 1994 to 1997 the West had one fewer team, and from 1998 to 2012, the Central had one more team). A third postseason round was added at the same time: the three division champions plus a wild card team (the team with the best record among those finishing in second place) now advance to the preliminary National League Division Series. Due to a players' strike, however, the postseason was not actually held in 1994.

Before the 1998 season, the American League and the National League each added a fifteenth team. Because of the odd number of teams, only seven games could possibly be scheduled in each league on any given day. Thus, one team in each league would have to be idle on any given day. This would have made it difficult for scheduling, in terms of travel days and the need to end the season before October. In order for MLB officials to continue primarily intraleague play, both leagues would need to carry an even number of teams, so the decision was made to move one club from the AL Central to the NL Central. Eventually, Milwaukee agreed (after Kansas City declined) to change leagues; the National League now had 16 teams, the American League 14 with the switch.

Beginning with the 2013 season, the Houston Astros moved from the National League Central to the American League West, which now gave both leagues three divisions of five teams each and necessitated interleague play throughout the season.

=== Designated hitter rule ===
Often characterized as being a more "traditional" or "pure" league, the National League did not adopt the designated hitter rule until the shortened 2020 season. Only the American League previously adopted the rule in 1973. In theory, this meant that the role of the manager was greater in the National League than in the American League, because the NL manager must take offense into account when making pitching substitutions and vice versa. However, this was disputed by some, such as former Detroit Tigers manager Jim Leyland, who claimed that the American League is more difficult because AL managers are required to know exactly when to pull a pitcher, whereas an NL manager merely pulls his pitcher when that spot comes up in the batting order. Overall, there were fewer home runs and runs scored in the National League than in the American, due to the presence of the pitcher in the NL batting order. As the collective bargaining agreement came closer to expiring after the 2021 season, owners expressed their intentions to use the designated hitter in all games starting in 2022. In response to the COVID-19 pandemic in 2020, rule changes were instituted in both leagues for the 2020 season, which included an abbreviated 60-game schedule, the use of the designated hitter in all games, and expanded rosters.

The National League reverted to its old batting rules during the 2021 season, but starting with the 2022 season, they permanently adopted the designated hitter rule after a new CBA was ratified.

=== Permanent interleague play ===
For the first 96 years of its coexistence with the American League, National League teams faced their AL counterparts only in exhibition games, the All-Star Game, or in the World Series. Beginning in 1997, however, interleague games have been played during the regular season and count in the standings. Prior to the early 2020s – before the universal designated hitter rule was started in both leagues – as part of the agreement instituting interleague play, the DH rule was used only in games where the American League team was the home team.

In 1999, the offices of American League and National League presidents were discontinued and all authority was vested in the Commissioner's office. The leagues subsequently appointed "honorary" presidents to carry out ceremonial roles such as the awarding of league championship trophies. Additionally, the distinction between AL and NL umpires was erased, and instead all umpires were unified under MLB control. Following these actions, as well as the institution of interleague play, little besides the DH rule remained to differentiate the two leagues.

By 2011, MLB had changed its policy on interleague play, deciding to schedule interleague games throughout the season rather than only during specially designated periods. This policy would allow each league to have 15 teams, with one team in each league playing an interleague game on any given day. As a condition of the sale of the Astros to Jim Crane in November 2011, the team agreed to move to the American League effective with the 2013 season.

In 2023, National League teams played 46 regular season interleague games against all 15 American League teams, 23 at home and 23 on the road. In 2025, this was increased to 48 regular season interleague games, 24 at home and 24 on the road.

=== Champions ===
As of the end of the 2025 season, the Dodgers have won the most NL pennants, with 26. Representing the National League against the American League, the Cardinals have won the most World Series (11), followed by the Dodgers (9), Giants (8), Pirates (5), and Reds (5). St. Louis also holds the distinction of being the only AA club to defeat an NL club in the 19th-century version of the World Series, having done so against their now-division rival Cubs.

== Teams ==
=== Charter franchises (1876) ===
The eight charter teams were the following:

- Athletic Club of Philadelphia from National Association, expelled after 1876 season
- Boston "Red Stockings" or "Red Caps") from National Association (exist today as the Atlanta Braves)
- Chicago "White Stockings" from National Association (exist today as the Chicago Cubs)
- Cincinnati "Red Stockings" new franchise, expelled after 1879 season
- Hartford "Dark Blues" (later the Brooklyn Hartfords) from National Association, folded after 1877 season
- Louisville "Colonels" or "Grays" new franchise, folded after 1877 season
- Mutual Club of New York or "Green Stockings" from National Association, expelled after 1876 season
- St Louis "Brown Stockings" from National Association, folded after 1877 season

=== Other franchises, 1878–1892 ===
Joined in 1878
Indianapolis Blues, folded after 1878
Milwaukee Grays, folded after 1878
Providence Grays, folded after 1885
Joined in 1879
Buffalo Bisons, dropped out of the league after 1885
Forest City of Cleveland, folded after 1884
Syracuse Stars, folded after 1879
Troy Trojans, folded after 1882
Joined in 1880
Cincinnati Stars, dropped from the National League after the season for refusing to sign a pledge to end beer sales in their park.
Worcester Ruby Legs, folded after 1882
Joined in 1881
Detroit Wolverines, folded after 1888
Joined in 1883
New York Gothams (exist today as the San Francisco Giants)
Philadelphia Quakers (exist today as the Philadelphia Phillies)
Joined in 1885
St. Louis Maroons, joined from U.A. Relocated to Indianapolis for 1887 season as the Indianapolis Hoosiers, folded after 1889
Joined in 1886
Kansas City Cowboys, folded after 1886
Washington Nationals, folded after 1889
Joined in 1887
Pittsburgh Alleghenys (exist today as the Pittsburgh Pirates), joined from AA
Joined in 1889
Cleveland Spiders, joined from AA, folded after 1899
Joined in 1890
Cincinnati Reds, joined from AA (exist today)
Brooklyn Grays (exist today as the Los Angeles Dodgers), joined from AA
Joined in 1892
Baltimore Orioles, joined from AA, contracted after 1899
Louisville Colonels, joined from AA, contracted after 1899
St. Louis Browns (exist today as the St. Louis Cardinals), joined from AA
Washington Senators, joined from AA, contracted after 1899

=== "Classic Eight" ===
The eight-team lineup established in 1900 remained unchanged through 1952. All franchises are still in the league, with five remaining in the same city.

- Boston (nicknamed at various times the "Red Stockings", "Red Caps", "Beaneaters" and "Doves", in 1912 named the Boston Braves, then Milwaukee Braves, now the Atlanta Braves)
- Brooklyn (variously labeled the "Bridegrooms", "Grooms", "Superbas", "Robins", "Trolley Dodgers", and "Bums", later called the Brooklyn Dodgers, now the Los Angeles Dodgers)
- Chicago (at first called by reporters the "White Stockings", then "Infants", "Colts", "Orphans", "Remnants" and by 1906 the Chicago Cubs)
- Cincinnati Reds (shortened from early "Red Stockings")
- New York Giants (sometimes "Gothams" and occasionally "Maroons", now the San Francisco Giants. "Giants" was in general press usage as early as the 1885 season and is probably the oldest consistent nickname in baseball, depending on how one categorizes "Phillies")
- Philadelphia Phillies (variously "Quakers", "Nationals" and "Pearls." Their ultimate name was just a shortening of the conventional plural-form "Philadelphias.")
- Pittsburgh (founded in Allegheny, a Pittsburgh suburb at the time which has since been annexed by the city, then claimed Pittsburgh as their home city but continued to be referred to as before as "Alleghenys." After "pirating" a player from the Athletics in the Players League collapse in 1890 were tagged "Pirates" in the press.)
- St. Louis (at various times "Brown Stockings", "Browns", "Red Stockings" and "Reds", and today officially the Cardinals and unofficially "Redbirds")

=== Expansion, relocation, and renaming, 1953–present ===
- 1953: Boston Braves move to Milwaukee
- 1958: Brooklyn Dodgers move to Los Angeles and New York Giants (baseball) move to San Francisco
- 1962: Houston Colt .45s and New York Mets enfranchised
- 1965: Houston Colt .45s renamed Astros
- 1966: Milwaukee Braves move to Atlanta
- 1969: Montreal Expos and San Diego Padres enfranchised
- 1993: Colorado Rockies and Florida Marlins enfranchised
- 1998: Arizona Diamondbacks enfranchised
- 1998: Milwaukee Brewers moved from the American League.
- 2005: Montreal Expos moved by MLB to Washington, D.C., renamed the Washington Nationals
- 2012: Florida Marlins renamed the Miami Marlins
- 2013: Houston Astros moved to the American League.

=== Current teams ===
Locations of NL teams for the 2017–present MLB seasons
West Central East

==== National League East ====
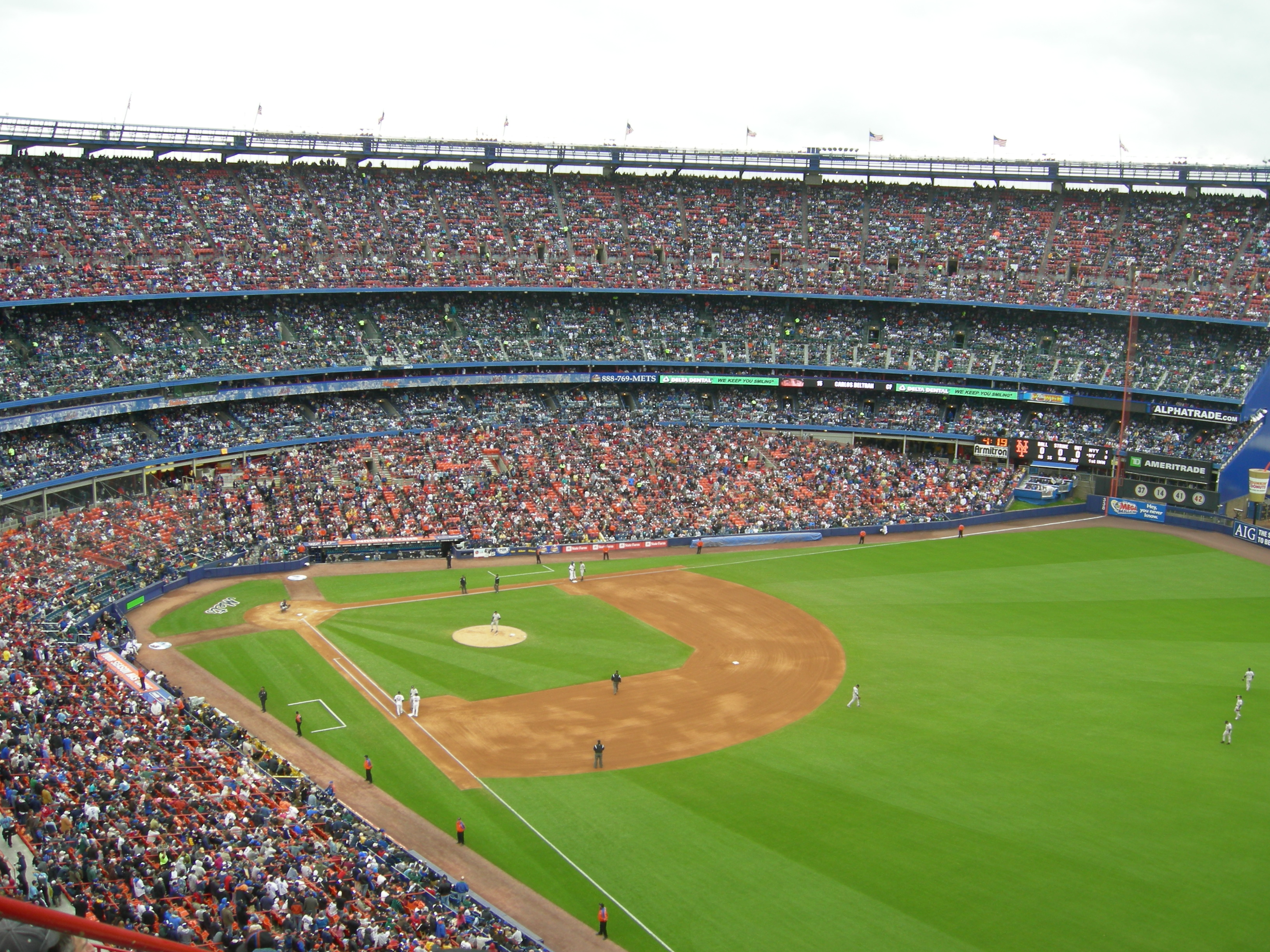
Shea Stadium prior to the start of a New York Mets game in 2008. In its final season before the Mets moved to Citi Field, Shea had the best attendance in the National League that year, drawing over 53,000 fans per game on average.

- Atlanta Braves, the oldest continually operating team in North American sports. Originally from Boston and known as "Beaneaters" and other nicknames, as original nickname faded and became re-associated with Cincinnati (and later with the Boston Red Sox). Adopted name "Braves" in 1912. Moved to Milwaukee (1953) and to Atlanta (1966). Prior to the 1994 realignment, the Braves competed in the West division.
- Miami Marlins, enfranchised 1993 as the Florida Marlins, changed name to Miami Marlins (2012).
- New York Mets, enfranchised 1962.
- Philadelphia Phillies, enfranchised 1883 and adopted the Phillies name officially in 1884. The team is the oldest continuous, one-name, one-city franchise in American professional sports history, although the Cubs (who adopted their name after the Phillies' establishment) are older, as are the Braves, who have moved twice.
- Washington Nationals, enfranchised 1969 as the Montreal Expos. Moved to Washington, D.C. (2005).

==== National League Central ====
- Chicago Cubs enfranchised 1870 as an independent professional team, chartered into the National Association in 1871, but suspended operations for 1872 and 1873 following the Great Chicago Fire. The team has been continuously active since 1874, making it the oldest continuously active team in its original city in Major League Baseball. It joined the National League as a charter member (1876). Originally called the "Chicago White Stockings" and later the "Chicago Colts" and several other names, the team was first called "Cubs" in 1902.
- Cincinnati Reds enfranchised 1882 in American Association, at first tagged "Red Stockings", joined National League (1890).
- Milwaukee Brewers enfranchised 1969 as the Seattle Pilots in American League, moved to Milwaukee (1970), transferred to National League (1998).
- Pittsburgh Pirates enfranchised 1882 in American Association, joined National League (1887), dubbed "Pirates" for signing Lou Bierbauer away from the Athletics in 1891.
- St. Louis Cardinals enfranchised 1882 in American Association, labeled "Brown Stockings" or just "Browns", joined National League (1892), later "Perfectos", eventually "Cardinals" for their red trim, now often "Redbirds."

==== National League West ====
- Arizona Diamondbacks enfranchised 1998
- Colorado Rockies enfranchised 1993
- Los Angeles Dodgers enfranchised 1883 as a minor league team, entered into the American Association as the Brooklyn Atlantics in 1884, soon acquired nickname "Dodgers" (from "trolley dodgers"), joined National League (1890). Also dubbed "Bridegrooms", "Superbas", "Robins" and "Bums" at various times, in addition to "Dodgers". Moved to Los Angeles (1958)
- San Diego Padres enfranchised 1969, sometimes called "Friars" or "Dads".
- San Francisco Giants enfranchised in New York City 1883, nearly half of its original players were members of the then just disbanded Troy club, nickname "Giants" in widespread use by 1886, moved to San Francisco (1958)

== Timeline ==
The first line is the formation of the National League (NL) in 1876, and the second is the transformation of the American League (AL) to a major league in 1901, signifying the beginning of modern baseball. The third line is the beginning of the expansion era in 1961. The fourth line marks the legal merger of the American and National Leagues into a single Major League Baseball in 2000.

World Series championships are shown with a "•", National League Pennants before the World Series are shown with a "^", and American League Pennants who lost the World Series are shown with a "#". No World Series was played in 1904, so the pennant winners for each league are indicated. Due to the 1994–95 Major League Baseball strike, there were no pennant or World Series winners in 1994, so this year is left blank.

- Prior to 1876, only teams from the National Association (NA) that established the NL are shown.
- Between 1876 and 1901, in addition to the NL teams, only American Association (AA) and Union Association (UA) teams that eventually joined the NL are shown.

== Presidents ==
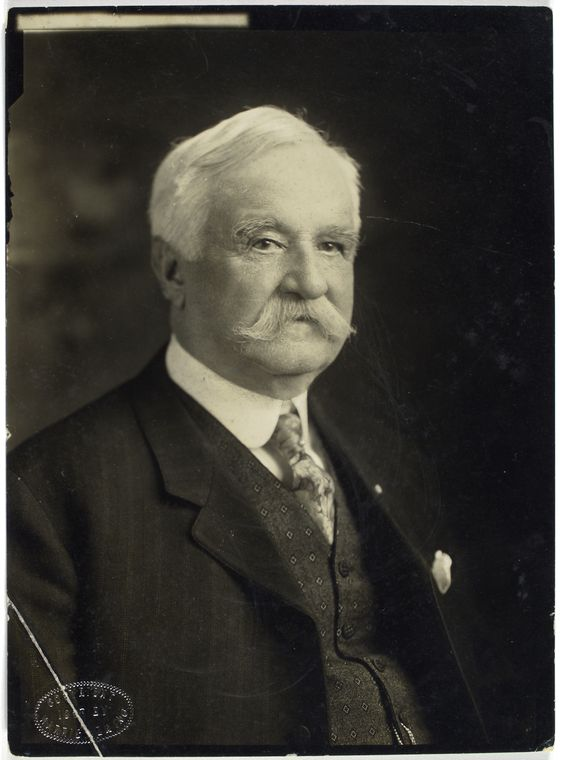
Morgan Bulkeley, the first president of the National League

Key
†	Member of the Baseball Hall of Fame

Name	Year(s)	Ref(s)
Morgan Bulkeley^{†}	1876	
William Hulbert^{†}	1877–1882	
Arthur Soden	1882	
Abraham G. Mills	1883–1884	
Nicholas Young	1885–1902	
Harry Pulliam	1903–1909	
John Heydler	1909	
Thomas Lynch	1910–1913	
John K. Tener	1913–1918	
John Heydler	1918–1934	
Ford C. Frick^{†}	1934–1951	
Warren Giles^{†}	1951–1969	
Chub Feeney	1970–1986	
A. Bartlett Giamatti	1986–1989	
Bill White	1989–1994	
Leonard S. Coleman, Jr.	1994–1999	

=== Honorary president ===
Following the 1999 season, the American and National Leagues were merged with Major League Baseball, and the leagues ceased to exist as business entities. The role of the league president was eliminated. In 2001, Bill Giles, son of Warren Giles, was named honorary president of the NL. Honorary presidents perform only ceremonial duties such as presenting league championship trophies and representing their respective leagues at All-Star Games.

=== See also ===
- List of American League presidents

== See also ==
- 19th-century National League teams
- American League – League within Major League Baseball
- List of National League pennant winners
- List of National League Wild Card winners
- Major League Baseball – North American professional baseball league
- National League Championship Series (NLCS) – Major League Baseball postseason series
- National League Division Series (NLDS) – Major League Baseball postseason series
- United Baseball League (proposed) – Proposed third major league
- World Series – Major League Baseball championship
