= John Heydler =

American baseball executive and umpire

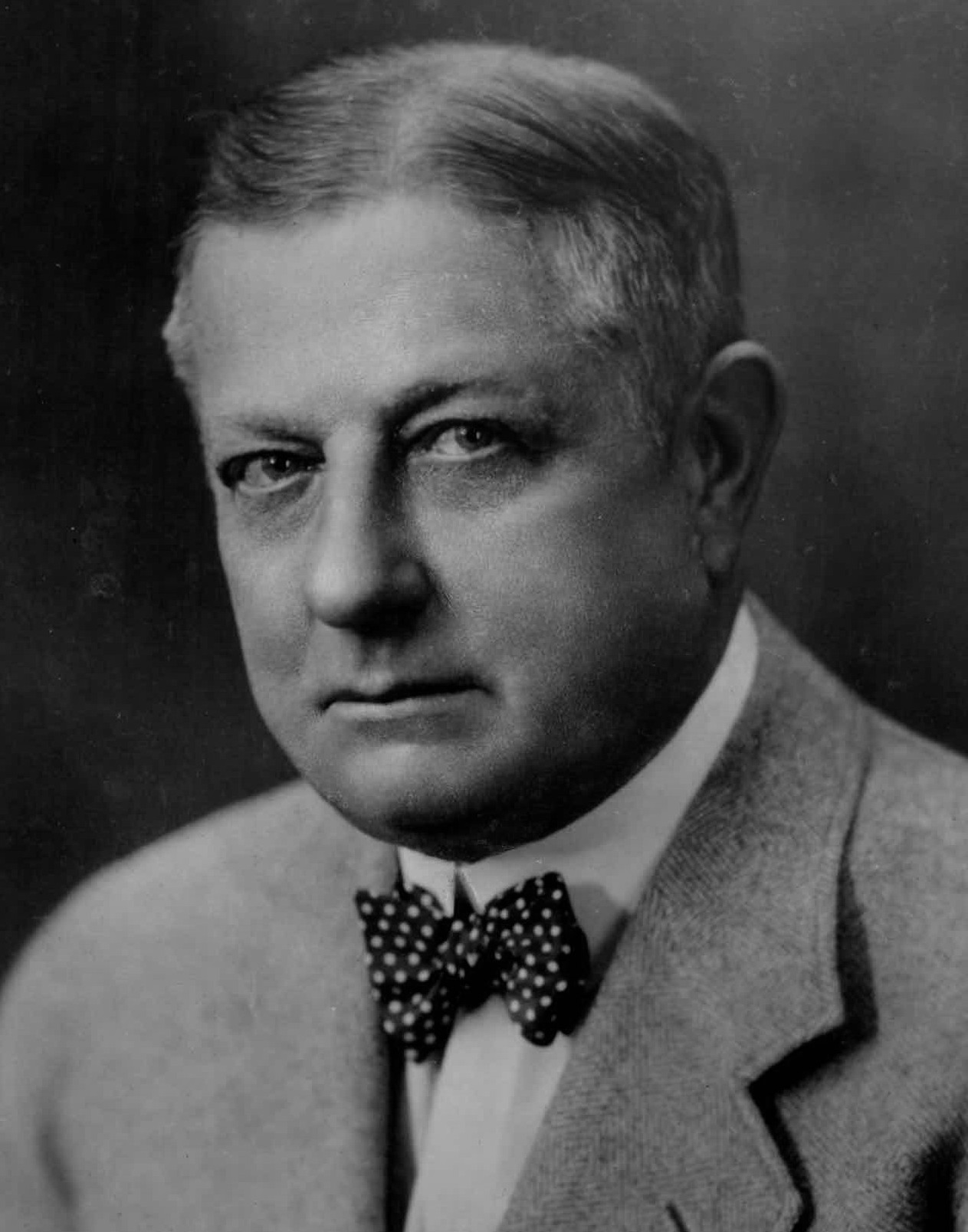
- Heydler in 1918
- Born: July 10, 1869; La Fargeville, New York, U.S.
- Died: April 18, 1956 (aged 86); San Diego, California, U.S.
- Occupations: National League president, umpire, sportswriter

John Arnold Heydler (July 10, 1869 – April 18, 1956) was an American executive in Major League Baseball. After working as a National League (NL) umpire, he was the secretary to the NL president and then became the secretary-treasurer of the NL before assuming the NL presidency himself. Heydler made early contributions to baseball recordkeeping and statistics.

== Biography ==
Born in La Fargeville, New York, Heydler was a printer's apprentice as a young man, and he eventually worked at the U.S. Government Printing Office. Heydler was an umpire in the NL from 1895 to 1898, umpiring a total of 83 games. He also worked as a sportswriter.

In 1903, he was hired as the private secretary to NL president Harry Pulliam, principally working to compile league playing statistics, a duty of every baseball league office. Heydler's work caused him to record much of the league's early history, and he became an advocate for new ways to measure player accomplishments; for example, he was a strong supporter of recording runs batted in for batters and he began computing earned run averages for pitchers.

On becoming the NL's secretary-treasurer from 1907 to 1918, he served as the league president briefly after Pulliam's suicide in 1909. As NL president again from 1918 to 1934, he hired the Elias brothers to maintain as official keeper of playing statistics (1919), and he pushed for the selection of Kenesaw Mountain Landis as Commissioner of Baseball (1921), realizing the importance of an official who could keep the owners in check. Later he helped to establish the Baseball Hall of Fame.

In December 1928, Heydler proposed permitting a tenth player to bat in place of the pitcher – a rule which came about with the creation of the designated hitter in 1973.

After retiring as league president, he served as NL chairman until his death in San Diego, California, in 1956, aged 86.

== See also ==
- Honor Rolls of Baseball
