= List of West Virginia state agencies =

The following is a list of the U.S. state of West Virginia's state agencies.

== Departments and agencies ==
- West Virginia Department of Administration
- West Virginia Department of Agriculture
- West Virginia Department of Commerce
  - West Virginia Division of Forestry
  - West Virginia Division of Labor
  - West Virginia Division of Natural Resources
  - West Virginia Geological and Economic Survey
  - West Virginia Office of Miners' Health, Safety and Training
  - West Virginia Water Development Authority
  - WORKFORCE West Virginia
- West Virginia Department of Economic Development
- West Virginia Department of Education
  - West Virginia Board of Education
- West Virginia Higher Education Policy Commission
- West Virginia Council for Community and Technical College Education
- West Virginia Department of Education and the Arts
  - West Virginia Division of Culture and History
  - West Virginia Division of Rehabilitation Services
- West Virginia Department of Environmental Protection
  - West Virginia Division of Air Quality
  - West Virginia Division of Land Restoration
  - West Virginia Division of Mining and Reclamation
  - West Virginia Division of Water and Waste Management
  - West Virginia Office of Abandoned Mine Lands and Reclamation
  - West Virginia Office of Environmental Advocate
  - West Virginia Office of Environmental Enforcement
  - West Virginia Office of Environmental Remediation
  - West Virginia Office of Explosives and Blasting
  - West Virginia Office of Oil and Gas
- West Virginia Department of Health and Human Resources
  - West Virginia Board of Medicine
  - West Virginia Bureau for Behavioral Health and Health Facilities
  - West Virginia Bureau for Child Support Enforcement
  - West Virginia Bureau for Children and Families
  - West Virginia Bureau for Medical Services
  - West Virginia Bureau for Public Health
    - West Virginia Office of Community and Rural Health Services
    - West Virginia Office of Emergency Medical Services
    - West Virginia Office of Environmental Health Services
  - West Virginia Office of Nutrition Services
- West Virginia Department of Homeland Security
  - West Virginia Division of Corrections and Rehabilitation
  - West Virginia Division of Emergency Management
  - West Virginia Division of Juvenile Services
  - West Virginia State Police
- West Virginia Department of Veterans Assistance
- West Virginia Department of Revenue
  - West Virginia Alcohol Beverage Control Administration
  - West Virginia Athletic Commission
  - West Virginia Division of Financial Institutions
  - West Virginia Insurance Commission
  - West Virginia Lottery Commission
  - West Virginia Municipal Bond Commission
  - West Virginia Office of Tax Appeals
  - West Virginia Racing Commission
  - West Virginia State Budget Office
  - West Virginia State Tax Department
- West Virginia Department of Transportation
  - West Virginia Division of Highways
  - West Virginia Division of Motor Vehicles
  - West Virginia Division of Public Transit
  - West Virginia State Rail Authority
  - West Virginia Parkways Authority
  - West Virginia Public Port Authority
- West Virginia Department of Tourism
- West Virginia State Treasurer
