= List of American League presidents =

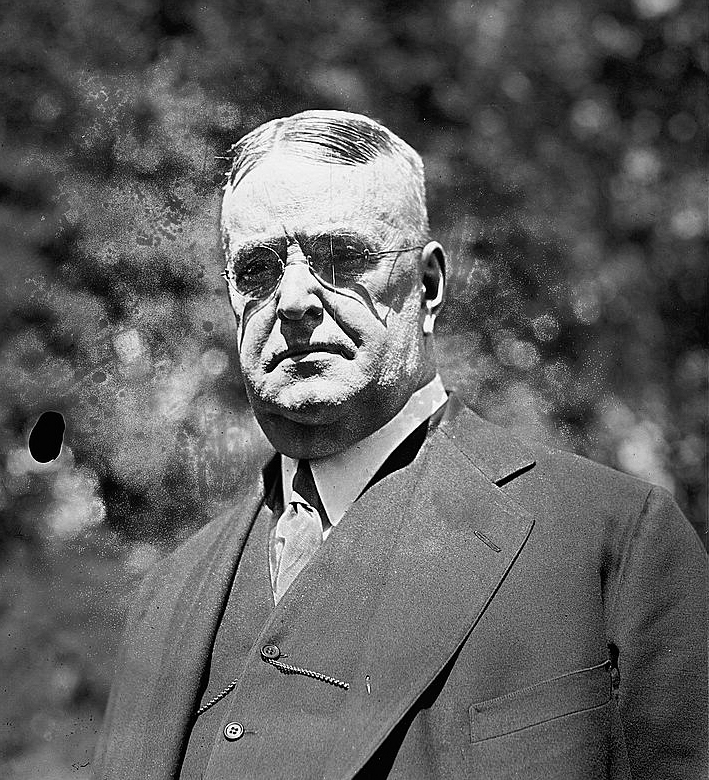
Ban Johnson in 1921

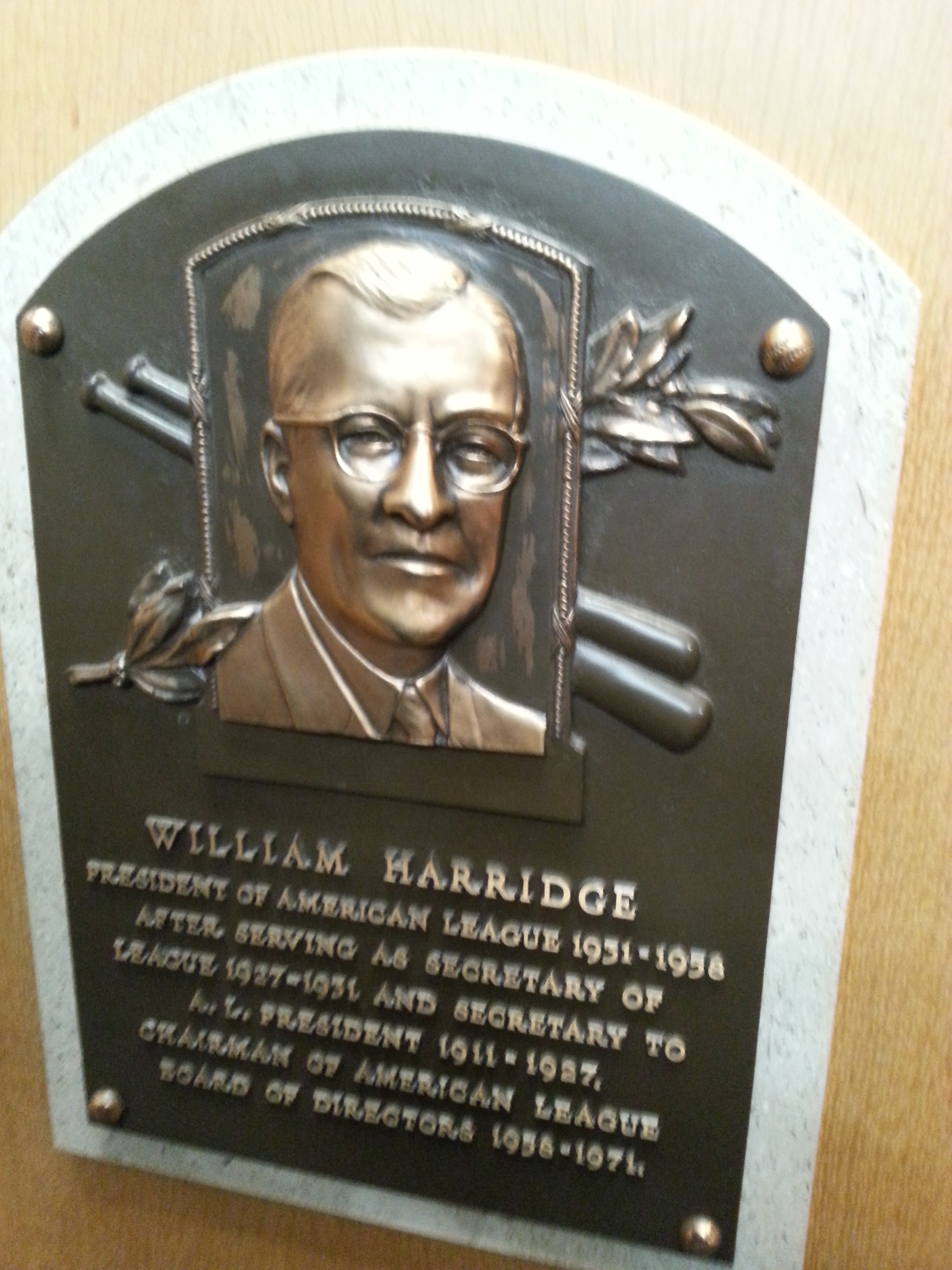
Will Harridge's plaque in the Baseball Hall of Fame

The American League president was the chief executive of the American League of professional baseball until 1999, when the AL and National League merged into Major League Baseball.

== American League presidents ==
Key
†	Member of the Baseball Hall of Fame

Name	Years	Ref
Ban Johnson^{†}	1901–1927	
Frank Navin	1927	
Ernest Barnard	1927–1931	
Will Harridge^{†}	1931–1959	
Joe Cronin^{†}	1959–1973	
Lee MacPhail^{†}	1973–1984	
Bobby Brown	1984–1994	
Gene Budig	1994–1999	

=== Honorary president ===
Following the 1999 season, the American and National Leagues were merged with Major League Baseball, and the leagues ceased to exist as business entities. The role of the league president was eliminated. Jackie Autry, the widow of former Angels owner Gene Autry served as honorary president of the AL, from 2000 to 2015. Hall of Famer Frank Robinson held the title from 2015 until his death in 2019.

Key
†	Member of the Baseball Hall of Fame

Name	Years	Ref
Jackie Autry	2000–2015	
Frank Robinson^{†}	2015–2019	

== See also ==
- List of National League presidents
