= Department of Administration =

Department of Administration, Ministry of Administration, and Office of Administration and similar names are titles used by multiple organisations, most commonly national or sub-national administrations:

== United States governmental organisations ==
=== National ===
- Office of Administration an entity within the Executive Office of the President
- Office of Compliance and Enforcement § Office of Administration and Policy a component office of the law enforcement arm of the Environmental Protection Agency

=== State ===
- Alaska Department of Administration an agency of the Government of Alaska
- Indiana Department of Administration an agency of the government of Indiana
- Kansas Department of Administration a department of the state of Kansas
- Minnesota Department of Administration an agency of the state of Minnesota
- Nevada State Department of Administration an agency of the Nevada state government
- North Carolina Department of Administration a cabinet-level agency in North Carolina
- Pennsylvania Office of Administration a cabinet-level agency in Pennsylvania
- Rhode Island Department of Administration a agency of the government of Rhode Island
- West Virginia Department of Administration an agency of the state of West Virginia
- Wisconsin Department of Administration an agency of the Wisconsin state government

== Other governmental organisations ==
- Department of Finance and Administration, a former government department in Australia
- Department of Public Service and Administration, a department of the government of South Africa
- Federal Office of Administration an agency of the German federal government
- Ministry of Public Administration (Croatia) a ministry of the Government of Croatia

== Other organisations ==
- Central Department of Public Administration, the academic department for public administration studies at Tribhuvan University in Nepal
- Greek Orthodox Archdiocese of America § Office of Administration responsible for the administrative, financial and developmental functions of the archdiocese
