= Lakin Correctional Center and Jail =

Women's prison in West Virginia

Coordinates: 38°57′05.7″N 82°05′04.6″W

Lakin Correctional Center and Jail (LCC) is a women's prison in the community of Lakin in unincorporated Mason County, West Virginia.

It is on a portion of former Lakin State Hospital property, on West Virginia Route 62, in proximity to West Columbia, 6 miles (9.7 km) north of Point Pleasant, and 3 miles (4.8 km) north of the Army National Guard armory. A part of the West Virginia Division of Corrections and Rehabilitation, it is the sole prison in that system that has only female prisoners. It has a capacity of 543 prisoners according to the website.

By 2024 some people had called the prison "Camp Cupcake", which came from Federal Prison Camp, Alderson.

== History ==
The prison's construction began in 1999, with some former Lakin Hospital buildings demolished to make way for the prison. Until the prison opened on January 29, 2003, there was no single women's prison in West Virginia and women were scattered across various facilities. A factory building and two minimum security housing facilities were built in 2005 and 2006.

In a period prior to 2015 the WVDOC considered converting Lakin into a men's prison and moving women to another prison in Sugar Grove. These plans were canceled since residents of Mason County and elected officials of that county and at the state level opposed this plan. On September 4, 2015, Governor of West Virginia Earl Ray Tomblin stated that a section of the property of the nearby armory could be used as a satellite for Lakin; area residents opposed this move.

== Facilities ==
The facility can house 462 prisoners including two minimum security facilities with a combined capacity of 160 prisoners.

== Programs ==
The West Virginia Department of Education operates vocational and educational programs.

== Notable inmates ==
- Shelia Eddy and Rachel Shoaf, convicted murderers of Skylar Neese
- Ramsey Carpenter-Bearse, former Miss. Kentucky
- Michelle Michael, a nurse convicted of murder and arson from a November 2005 fire.

== See also ==
- Incarceration of women in the United States
