= West Columbia =

West Columbia is the name of the following towns in the United States:

- West Columbia, South Carolina
- West Columbia, Texas
- West Columbia, West Virginia
