= Copperas works =

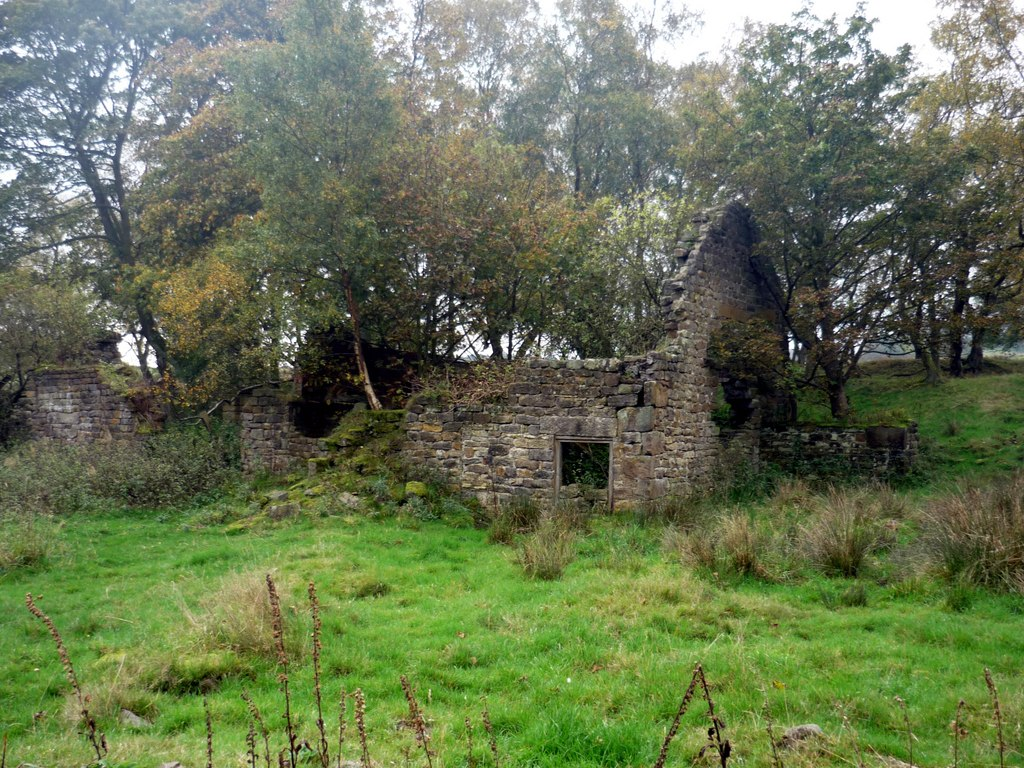
Copperas house, Limb Valley. Copperas (iron(II) sulfate) was manufactured here from the pyritic Ringinglow coal seam, mined nearby. The copperas solution was used in the leather tanning industry.

Copperas works are manufactories where copperas (iron(II) sulfate) is produced from pyrite, often obtained as a byproduct during coal mining, and iron. The history of producing green vitriol, as it was known, goes back hundreds of years in Scotland. In 1814 the wool-producing city of Steubenville, Ohio had seven copperas-producing manufacturers.

Pyrite has been used since classical times to manufacture copperas. Iron pyrite was heaped up and allowed to weather (an example of an early form of heap leaching). The acidic runoff from the heap was then boiled with iron to produce iron sulfate.

Containment of leachate is important due to its toxicity; a fish kill that occurred in the 1890s in the Kanawha River was attributed to copperas solution release from the mines in Cannelton, West Virginia.

The "vitriolic waters of Fahlun" (Falun, Sweden), according to Murray (1844), annually produced "about 600 quintals of green vitriol" (sulfate of iron), as well as a "small quantity of blue vitriol" (sulfate of copper). These may have been obtained through evaporation of the groundwater associated with mines in order to yield the crystalline form of copperas.
