= Smithers Creek =

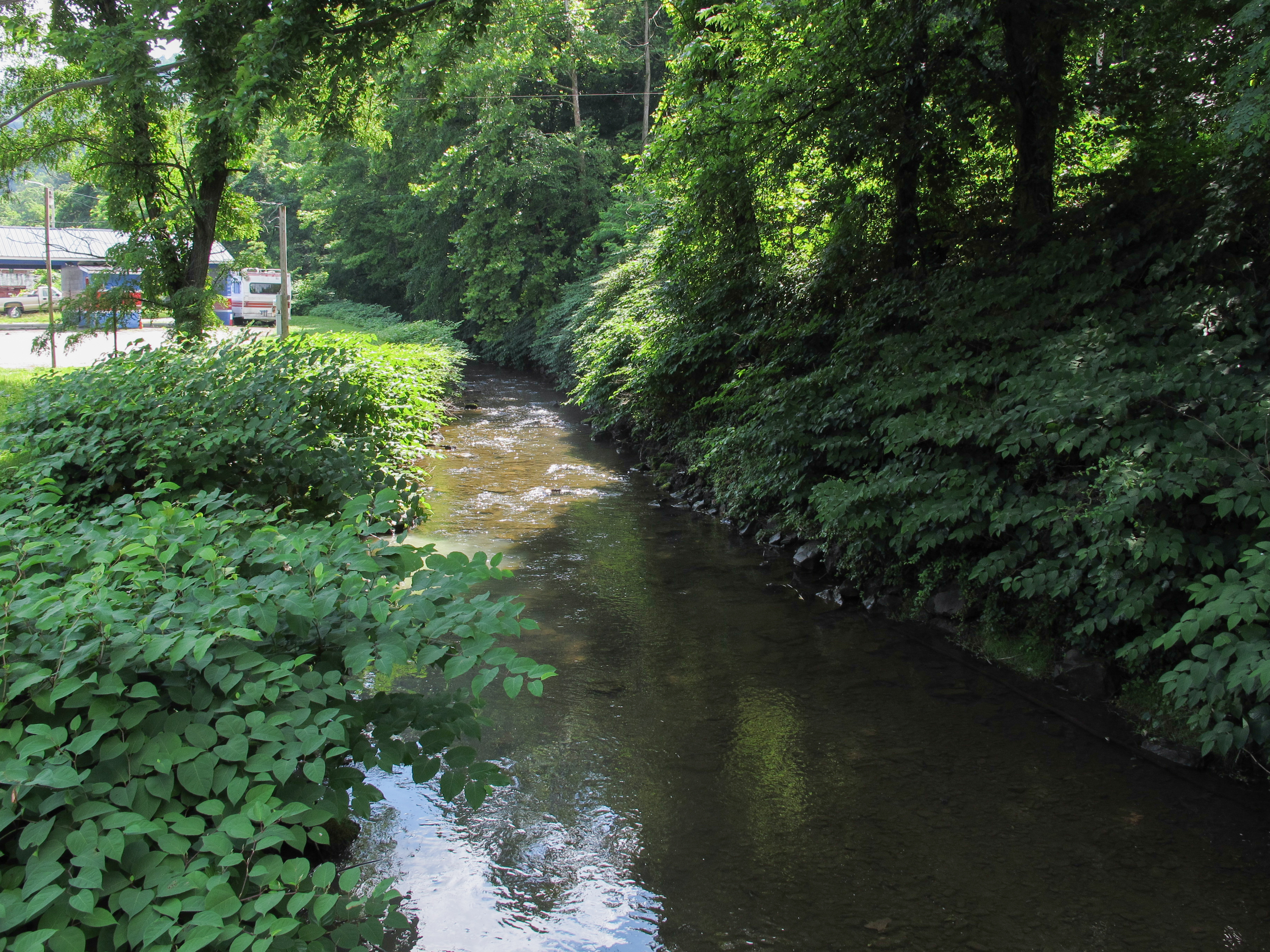
- Smithers Creek in Smithers

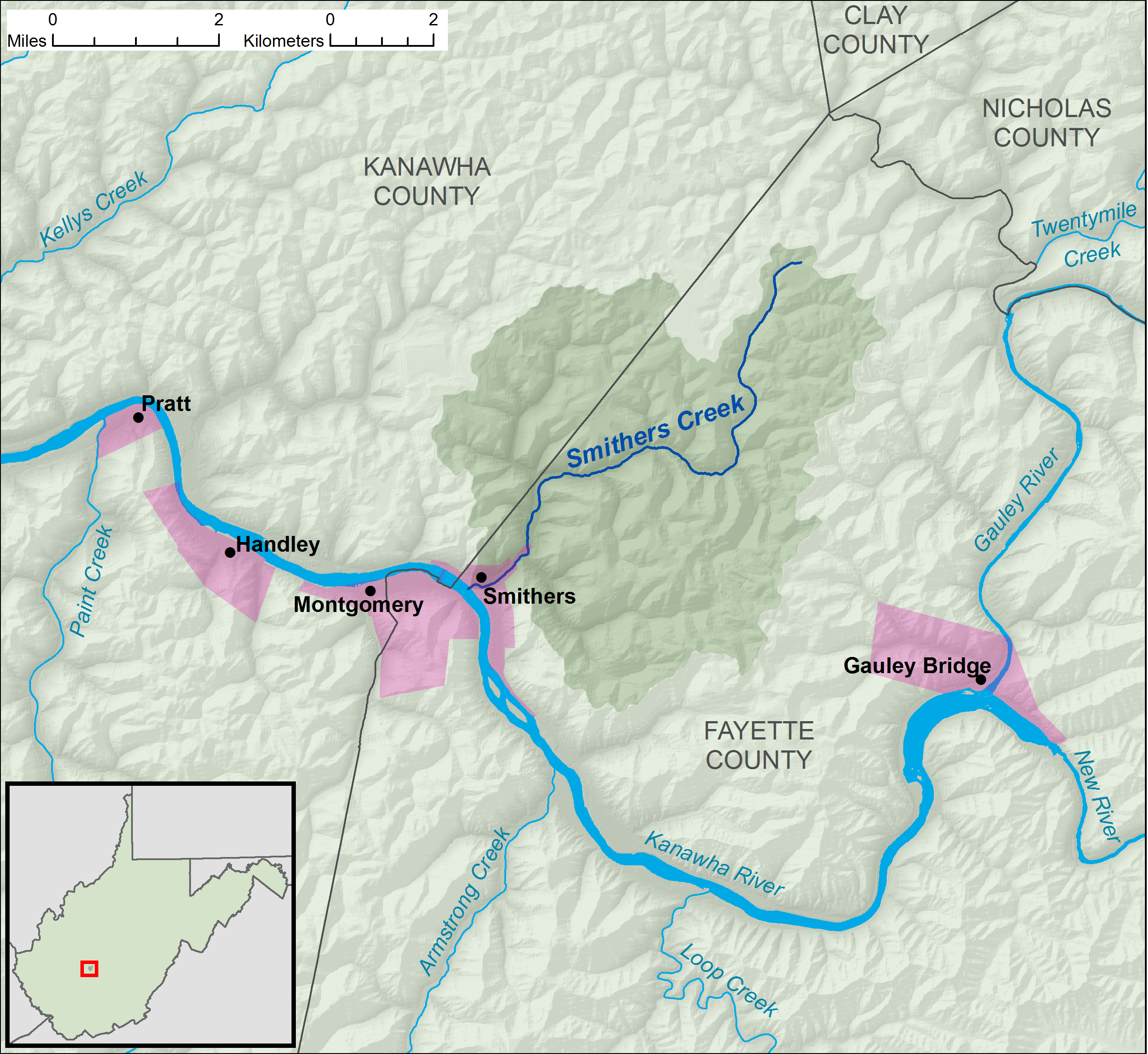
- A map of Smithers Creek and its watershed

Location
- Country: United States
- State: West Virginia
- County: Fayette

Physical characteristics
- Source
  - location: Mount Olive
  - coordinates: 38.2384388°N 81.2359437°W
  - elevation: 1,477 ft (450 m)
- Mouth: Kanawha River
  - location: Smithers
  - coordinates: 38.1809390°N 81.3106669°W
  - elevation: 640 ft (200 m)
- Length: 7 mi (11 km)
- Basin size: 18.1 sq mi (47 km^{2})

Basin features
- Hydrologic Unit Code: 050500060303 (USGS)

Smithers Creek is a tributary of the Kanawha River, 7 miles (11 km) long, in southern West Virginia in the United States. Via the Kanawha and Ohio rivers, it is part of the watershed of the Mississippi River, draining an area of 18.1 square miles (47 km^{2}) on the unglaciated portion of the Allegheny Plateau. The creek flows for its entire length in western Fayette County; its tributaries additionally drain a portion of eastern Kanawha County.

Smithers Creek rises in the unincorporated community of Mount Olive and flows generally southwestward through the unincorporated communities of Marting and Cannelton, to the city of Smithers, where it flows into the Kanawha River. The creek is paralleled by a county road for most of its course.

The Geographic Names Information System lists "Smothers Creek," "Smuthers Creek," and "Smythers Creek" as historical variant names for the creek.

== See also ==
- List of rivers of West Virginia
