= West Virginia State Police Academy =

Police academy in Institute, West Virginia, United States

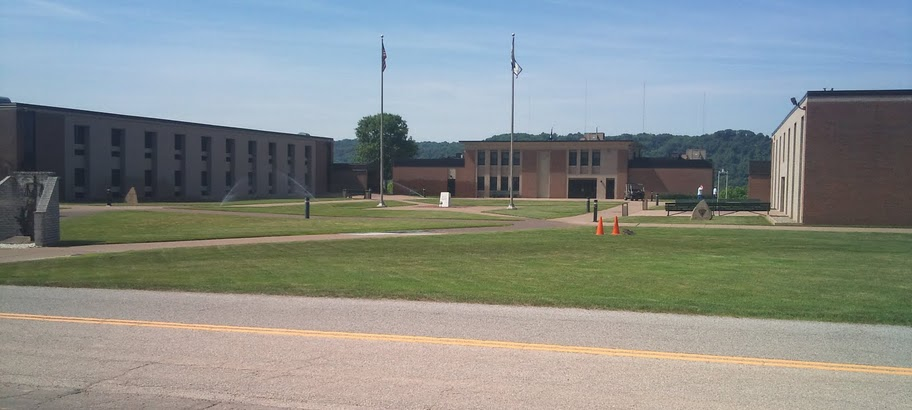
The academy grounds as pictured on June 2, 2011

The West Virginia State Police Academy is a law enforcement training institution, operated by the West Virginia State Police, located in Institute, West Virginia. The academy trains West Virginia troopers for the State Police force and newly hired municipal, university police officers, sheriff deputies, motor carrier enforcement and conservation officers from across the state. It and the Fairmont State University Police Academy in Fairmont, West Virginia are the only law enforcement training schools in West Virginia.

The State Police Academy, founded by (Ret.) Captain Charles Ray, held its first training class in 1953. The school sits on 24 acres (97,000 m^{2}) of land.

== Campus ==
The academy has four 50-seat audiovisual instruction rooms for classes, a library, a cafeteria for trainees and their staff, a gymnasium, a computer lab and dormitories (barracks). It also has an outdoor firing range that is equipped for rifle training at a distance of up to 100 yards (91 m).

The main compound consists of three buildings. "A" building has two floors that house the male barracks, the director/commandant's office, the assistant director's office and various utility rooms as well as a computer lab. "B" building holds additional offices for the academy staff, and the female barracks on the second floor. Also located in "B" building is the State Police archives and a classroom. "C" building is the location of the cafeteria and two main classrooms as well as two conference rooms and additional office space. On the second floor of "C" building are staff rooms and additional barracks for in service or "sit in" students.

The old gymnasium is located in the old hangar building which is closest to "C" building. There is also an obstacle course near the hangar. A new gymnasium building was completed in March 2012. The 12,000 square-foot facility now includes a basketball court, a weigh training and cardio rooms, a running track and a mixed-martial arts training area.

The campus does not have an Emergency Vehicle Operation Course (EVOC) area for cadets and basic class officers to practice in simulation of car chases, pursuits and speed driving. Trainees must currently take driving courses on a parking lot and at a nearby local airport runway. However, in December 2008, the academy purchased a $108,000 driving simulator that will be used by students to further enhance training.

The academy also houses the West Virginia State Police K-9 unit and the Professional Development Center (P.D.C.) which serves as an in-service learning facility for all law enforcement officers.

== Cadet training ==
The West Virginia State Police Academy trains its own cadets accepted by the State Police after a five-phase hiring process. Those cadets stay on academy grounds Monday through Friday during the 25-week training period. They can leave the campus on week-ends but are required to come back on Sunday nights to get ready for the following week. Cadets are promoted to the rank of "Trooper" after successfully completing training. To be accepted into the academy for cadet training, State Police recruits must be able to perform at least 27 push-ups per minute, 29 sit-ups per minute and be able to run 1.5-mile (2.4 km) in no more than 14:52 seconds during the initial physical test. These requirements are set by the West Virginia State Police and exceed state standards. Applicants must also pass all the remaining phases during the hiring process. Additional phases include a written exam, an oral interview, a background investigation, a drug screening, a psychological and medical evaluation and a final interview Training for cadets usually occur once a year.

== Basic class training ==
Like cadets, all of the state's municipal, university police officers, county sheriff deputies, Natural Resources Police Officers, and Motor Carrier Enforcement trainees observe the same academy rules and policies. Their curriculum, although shorter, is similar in intensity. It retains a paramilitary environment and style of training.

Basic class students currently train for 16 weeks. In addition to their individual department hiring standards, to be accepted for basic class training, students must be able to perform 18 properly executed push-ups per minute, 27 properly executed sit-ups per minute and run 1.5-mile (2.4 km) in a maximum time limit of 15:20 seconds. These are requirements established by the West Virginia Law Enforcement Professional Standards Committee. Basic class training sessions are spread throughout the year with individual departments paying a fee for tuition as well as their respective attendee’s salary during training.

== Academy traditions ==
The academy has many traditions that students who attend and often civilians who visit the academy are expected to honor. For example, in each of the main buildings on the academy grounds there is a large tile replica of the West Virginia State Police patch directly in front of the entrance doors. It is difficult not to step on the patches due to their proximity to those doors. Those who step on the patches are sometimes scolded by academy staff members. Students are frequently punished for stepping on it as this is seen as a sign of disrespect. Students are required to clean the patches as part of a cleaning detail in addition to other assigned tasks.

Since the academy operates in a paramilitary nature, students are expected to salute ranking officers of the State Police and any other ranking law enforcement officer at the academy. Students often practice marching exercises as well as chanting, running and marching cadences.

The West Virginia State Police Academy is often referred to as "the hill" by its alumni.

== See also ==
- West Virginia State Police
- List of law enforcement agencies in West Virginia
- Police academy
- State police
- State patrol
- Highway patrol
