= Lakin, West Virginia =

- Unincorporated community
- Location within West Virginia Location within the United States
- Coordinates: 38°57′31″N 82°05′14″W
- Country: United States
- State: West Virginia
- County: Mason
- Elevation: 604 ft (184 m)
- Time zone: UTC-5 (Eastern (EST))
  - Summer (DST): UTC-4 (EDT)
- ZIP codes: 25250
- Area codes: 304 & 681
- GNIS feature ID: 1549777

Lakin is an unincorporated community in Mason County, West Virginia, United States. Lakin is located on West Virginia Route 62, 5 miles (8.0 km) southwest of Mason.

The community was named after one M. Lakin, a state official.

== Infrastructure ==
The West Virginia Division of Corrections and Rehabilitation operates the women's prison Lakin Correctional Center in Lakin. West Virginia Department of Health and Human Resources has operated a 114-bed long term care nursing home, the Lakin Hospital, on the grounds of the former Lakin State Hospital since 1979. Previously, the state run Lakin Industrial School operated from 1924 until 1956.

American Electric Power operates a sub-critical 138-69KV electrical substation located in Lakin.
