= Mount Olive Correctional Complex =

Maximum security prison in West Virginia

Coordinates: 38°14′07″N 81°14′17″W

- Interactive map of Mount Olive Correctional Complex
- Location: 1 Mountainside Way Mount Olive, West Virginia
- Status: Open
- Security class: Maximum
- Capacity: 1,030
- Opened: 1995
- Managed by: West Virginia Division of Corrections and Rehabilitation

Mount Olive Correctional Complex (MOCC) is the male maximum security prison for the state of West Virginia, United States. MOCC is an operational unit of the West Virginia Division of Corrections and Rehabilitation.

Built as a replacement for the Civil War-era West Virginia Penitentiary at Moundsville, Mount Olive Correctional Complex (MOCC) is located seven miles east of Montgomery on Cannelton Hollow Road in Fayette County. MOCC is the state's only maximum-security correctional facility and has a current capacity of 1,030 inmates. MOCC houses the most violent, high-risk, dangerous and disruptive inmates in the state and has the most diverse inmate population in the state; consisting of general population, punitive segregation, administrative segregation, intake, special management, mental health, acute medical, and work camp inmates.

Construction of MOCC began in the spring of 1991 and was completed in December 1994. The facility was dedicated on December 12, 1994, and received it first inmates on February 14, 1995. Inmate transfers were completed on March 27, 1995, and the West Virginia Penitentiary was closed. Total construction costs for MOCC were $61.8 million.

The facility is encompassed by a secure perimeter fence approximately one mile long. Of the 120-acre site, approximately 80 acres are inside the secure perimeter. Extensive use is made of both electronic and manual security controls. MOCC operates as a small town, having its own post office and ZIP code, power plant, electrical sub-station, fuel depot, water supply, central warehouse, maintenance garage, hospital and medical clinic, gymnasium, chapel, library, classrooms, courtroom, food service and laundry facilities.

Professionals through contractual agreements provide medical, dental, mental health and food services. The West Virginia Department of Education provides many educational and vocational programs for the inmate population such as ABE/GED, Transition Skills, Business Education, Vocational Agriculture, Welding and Culinary Arts. An Apprenticeship Program in Food Service is also available. Limited college courses for associate degrees are also available through BridgeValley Community & Technical College.

In partnership with Catalyst Ministries, Appalachian Bible College operates an on-site extension campus at MOCC which focuses on moral rehabilitation. Mount Olive Bible College offers an accredited Bachelor of Arts degree in Bible & Theology, and allows inmates to be ordained as ministers. This program is unique to all but two prisons in the United States.
