= Will Harridge =

American baseball executive (1883–1971)

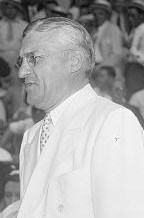
- Harridge at the 1937 All Star Game
- American League President; 1931–1959
- Born: October 16, 1883; Chicago, Illinois, U.S.
- Died: April 9, 1971 (aged 87); Evanston, Illinois, U.S.

Member of the National

Baseball Hall of Fame
- Induction: 1972
- Election method: Veterans Committee

William Harridge (October 16, 1883 – April 9, 1971) was an American executive in professional baseball whose most significant role was as president of the American League (AL) from 1931 to 1959. Harridge, who was formative in creating the Baseball All Star Game in 1933, was elected to the Baseball Hall of Fame by the Veterans Committee in 1972.

== Early life and career ==
Will Harridge was born in the Hyde Park neighborhood of Chicago, Illinois. He worked as a railway ticket clerk before being hired in 1911 as the personal secretary to Ban Johnson, president of baseball's American League.

== Baseball career ==
In 1927, Harridge became the American League secretary. He then became president of the American League in 1931, held that post until his retirement in 1958, and then was named president emeritus. At that point the league office was moved to Boston, and Harridge was allowed to keep the Chicago office as well as act as custodian of the American League archive correspondence.

Harridge faced some criticism for his involvement in allowing Arnold Johnson, a business associate of New York Yankees owners Dan Topping and Del Webb, to purchase the Philadelphia Athletics and move them to Kansas City rather than allow local owners to purchase the team and keep it in Philadelphia. He is also criticized by some for his then "non-involvement" in turning a blind eye to the control that the Yankees had over Johnson and the A's.

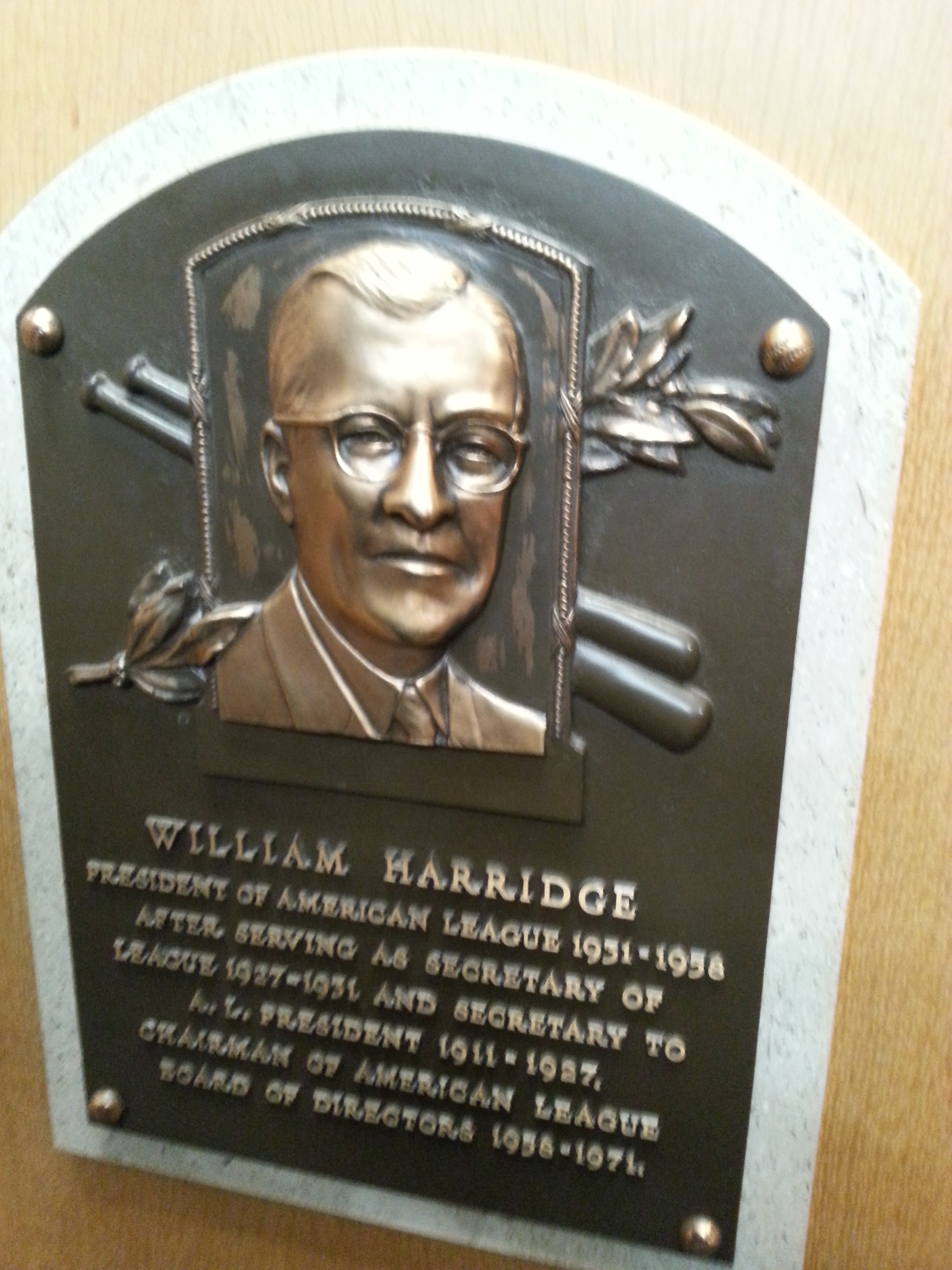
Harridge's plaque at the National Baseball Hall of Fame and Museum

Harridge often cited a 1932 incident as his most difficult decision in baseball. During a July 4 game between the New York Yankees and Washington Senators, a collision occurred at home plate involving Senators outfielder Carl Reynolds and Yankees catcher Bill Dickey. Dickey dropped the ball, but chased down Reynolds and punched him, resulting in a broken jaw. Though Dickey was a star player with the most powerful franchise in baseball, Harridge issued him a $1,000 fine and a thirty-day suspension.

He is more widely known for a ruling that he made in 1951 when dwarf Eddie Gaedel signed a contract with Bill Veeck's St. Louis Browns. Gaedel registered one career plate appearance in August of that year, earning a walk on four straight pitches. Harridge decided that Veeck was making a mockery of baseball and cancelled Gaedel's contract the next day.

== Later life ==
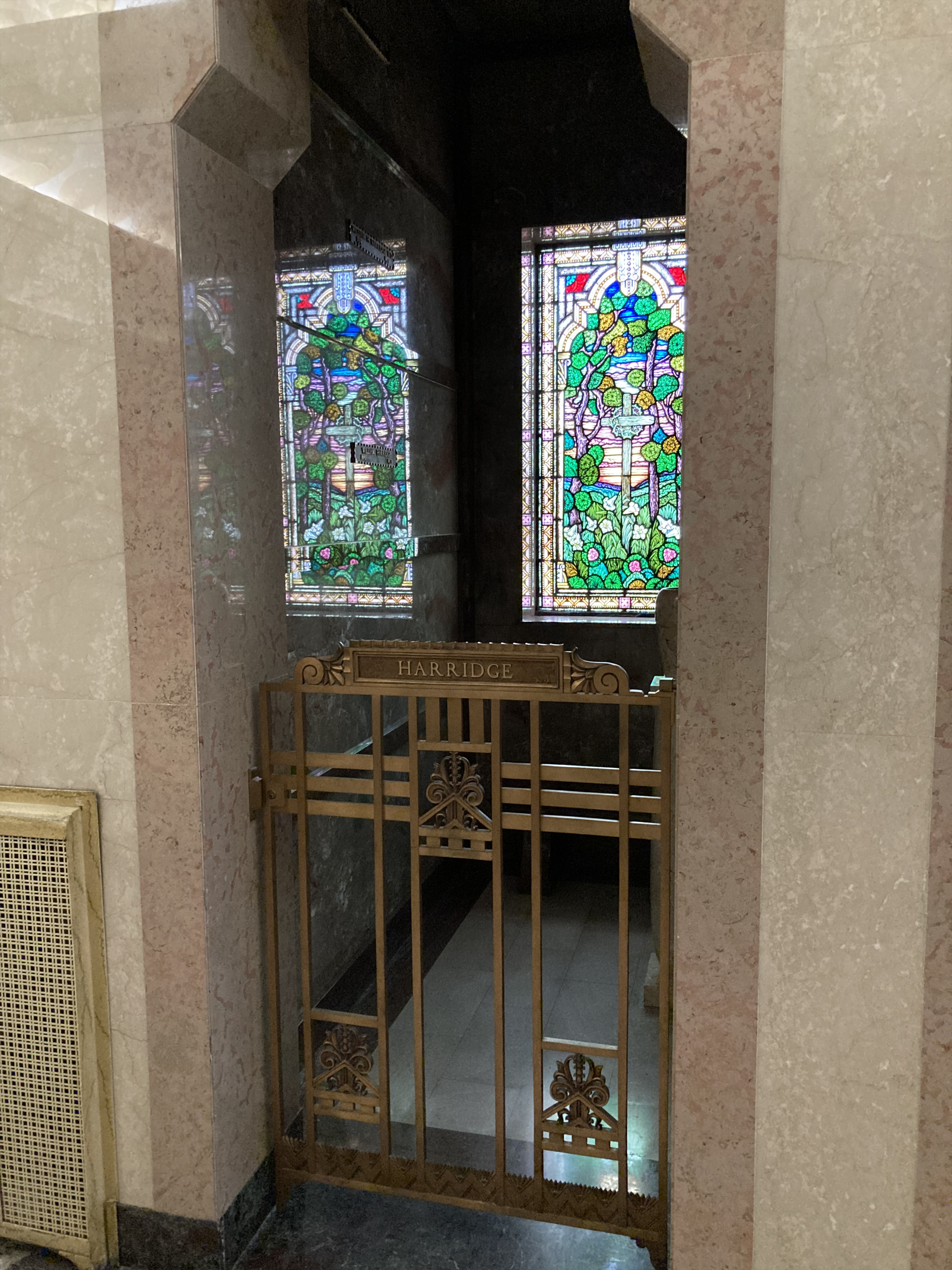
Harridge's grave at Memorial Park Cemetery

In 1967, Harridge was driving through Wilmette when he struck and killed architect Barry Byrne of Evanston. Harridge was neither ticketed nor charged in the accident.

Harridge died at age 87 in Evanston, Illinois, and is interred in Memorial Park in Skokie.

== Legacy ==
The American League Championship Series winner's trophy is named the William Harridge Trophy in his honor.

== Footnotes ==
Preceded by Ernest Barnard	American League president 1931–1959	Succeeded by Joe Cronin
