= Cannelton, West Virginia =

Unincorporated community in West Virginia, United States

- Unincorporated community
- Location within West Virginia Location within the United States
- Coordinates: 38°11′39″N 81°17′45″W
- Country: United States
- State: West Virginia
- County: Fayette
- Elevation: 679 ft (207 m)
- Time zone: UTC-5 (Eastern (EST))
  - Summer (DST): UTC-4 (EDT)
- ZIP code: 25036
- Area codes: 304 & 681
- GNIS feature ID: 1537004

Cannelton is an unincorporated community in Fayette County, West Virginia, United States. Cannelton is 1 mile (1.6 km) northeast of Smithers, along Smithers Creek. Cannelton has a post office with ZIP code 25036. The community was named for the deposits of cannel coal in the area.

Cannelton was established in 1849. Cannel coal was discovered in 1848. Ben Burdette, who was working on Col. Aaron Stockton lumber enterprise on the mountain, discovered cannel coal. Cannel coal was discovered to have a very high oil content and that made it very valuable. Col. Aaron Stockton started mining cannel coal and shipping it on the Ohio and Mississippi Rivers. It was the first established town in Montgomery-Smithers vicinity. The first post office was established in 1876.

== Col. Aaron Stockton ==
Col. Aaron Stockton was born in Princeton, New Jersey and was the grandson of Richard Stockton, who signed the Declaration of Independence. Stockton was an enterprising man. He moved his family to the Kanawha Valley soon after the War of 1812. He tried his hand at the salt industry first. Stockton hired his brother-in-law, William Tompkins, to work with him in the salt industry. However, Stockton quickly released salt was not his calling. He sold off all of his holdings to Tompkins after the first trust was established that regulated salt prices and production levels.

Stockton bought what is now known as Glen Ferris Inn in 1817. The property was not only his family home, he used it also as a tavern to benefit from its ideal spot. It is located right on the Midland Trail which had recently opened when Stockton applied for his tavern license in 1839. The spot also benefited from river traffic as that it is right at the bottom of Kanawha Falls. The Inn was also used as a Union Army Quartermaster depot during the Civil War with two future presidents camping on the property.

== Cannel coal ==
Cannel coal is very high in oil. The high oil content made it very valuable during the mid 1800s. Kerosene could be refined from the oil. The kerosene refined from the coal was the main source of lighting. It is a bituminous coal with a low mineral content. It burns longer than wood and has a bright, clear flame.

== Mining ==
The Cannelton Coal and Coke Company acquired the 2,100 acre enterprise in 1871. Although it had changed owners many times, it operated until 2003. However, in 2004, Massey Energy acquired the property and resumed production. Production began on December 28, 2004.
