= List of law enforcement agencies in West Virginia =

This is a list of law enforcement agencies in the state of West Virginia.

According to the US Bureau of Justice Statistics' 2008 Census of State and Local Law Enforcement Agencies, the state had 233 law enforcement agencies employing 3,382 sworn police officers, about 186 for each 100,000 residents.

== Federal agencies ==
Federal Bureau of Investigation Criminal Justice Information Services Division

== State agencies ==
- Hatfield-McCoy Recreation Area Park Rangers
- West Virginia Alcohol Beverage Control Administration
- West Virginia Division of Forestry Special Operations and Enforcement Division
- West Virginia Division of Natural Resources Law Enforcement Section (Natural Resources Police)
- West Virginia Division of Protective Services
- West Virginia Public Service Commission Motor Carrier Enforcement
- West Virginia State Fire Marshal's Office
- West Virginia State Police
- West Virginia Military Authority - Camp Dawson Security

=== State Correctional agencies ===
- West Virginia Division of Corrections and Rehabilitation
- West Virginia Regional Jail and Correctional Authority

== County agencies ==
- Barbour County Sheriff's Office
- Berkeley County Sheriff's Office
- Boone County Sheriff's Office
- Braxton County Sheriff's Office
- Brooke County Sheriff's Office
- Cabell County Sheriff's Office
- Calhoun County Sheriff's Office
- Clay County Sheriff's Office
- Doddridge County Sheriff's Office
- Fayette County Sheriff's Office
- Gilmer County Sheriff's Office
- Grant County Sheriff's Office
- Greenbrier County Sheriff's Office
- Hampshire County Sheriff's Office
- Hancock County Sheriff's Office
- Hardy County Sheriff's Office
- Harrison County Sheriff's Office
- Jackson County Sheriff's Office
- Jefferson County Sheriff's Office
- Kanawha County Sheriff's Office
- Lewis County Sheriff's Office
- Lincoln County Sheriff's Office
- Logan County Sheriff's Office
- Marion County Sheriff's Office
- Marshall County Sheriff's Department
- Mason County Sheriff's Office
- McDowell County Sheriff's Office
- Mercer County Sheriff's Office
- Mineral County Sheriff's Office
- Mingo County Sheriff's Office
- Monongalia County Sheriff's Office
- Monroe County Sheriff's Office
- Morgan County Sheriff's Office
- Nicholas County Sheriff's Office
- Ohio County Sheriff's Office
- Pendleton County Sheriff's Office
- Pleasants County Sheriff's Office
- Pocahontas County Sheriff's Office
- Preston County Sheriff's Office
- Putnam County Sheriff's Office
- Raleigh County Sheriff's Office
- Randolph County Sheriff's Office
- Ritchie County Sheriff's Office
- Roane County Sheriff's Office
- Summers County Sheriff's Office
- Taylor County Sheriff's Office
- Tucker County Sheriff's Office
- Tyler County Sheriff's Office
- Upshur County Sheriff's Office
- Wayne County Sheriff's Office
- Webster County Sheriff's Office
- Wetzel County Sheriff's Office
- Wirt County Sheriff's Office
- Wood County Sheriff's Office
- Wyoming County Sheriff's Office

== Municipal agencies ==
- Alderson Police Department
- Anmoore Police Department
- Ansted Police Department
- Athens Police Department
- Barboursville Police Department
- Barrackville Police Department
- Beckley Police Department
- Beech Bottom Police Department
- Belington Police Department
- Belle Police Department
- Benwood Police Department
- Berkeley Springs/Town of Bath Police Department
- Bethlehem Police Department
- Bluefield Police Department
- Bradshaw Police Department
- Bramwell Police Department
- Bridgeport Police Department
- Buckhannon Police Department
- Buffalo Police Department
- Cameron Police Department
- Capon Bridge Police Department
- Cedar Grove Police Department
- Ceredo Police Department
- Chapmanville Police Department
- Charles Town Police Department
- Charleston Police Department
- Chesapeake Police Department
- Chester Police Department
- Clarksburg Police Department
- Clendenin Police Department
- Cowen Police Department
- Danville Police Department
- Delbarton Police Department
- Dunbar Police Department
- East Bank Police Department
- Eleanor Police Department
- Elkins Police Department
- Fairmont Police Department
- Farmington Police Department
- Fayetteville Police Department
- Fort Gay Police Department
- Follansbee Police Department
- Gary Police Department
- Gassaway Police Department
- Gauley Bridge Police Department
- Gilbert Police Department
- Glasgow Police Department
- Glenville Police Department
- Grafton Police Department
- Grant Town Police Department
- Grantsville Police Department
- Granville Police Department
- Hamlin Police Department
- Handley Police Department
- Harpers Ferry Police Department
- Harrisville Police Department
- Hinton Police Department
- Huntington Police Department
- Hurricane Police Department
- Kenova Police Department
- Kermit Police Department
- Keyser Police Department
- Keystone Police Department
- Kingwood Police Department
- Lewisburg Police Department
- Logan Police Department
- Lumberport Police Department
- Mabscott Police Department
- Madison Police Department
- Man Police Department
- Mannington Police Department
- Marlinton Police Department
- Marmet Police Department
- Martinsburg Police Department
- Mason Police Department
- Masontown Police Department
- McMechen Police Department
- Milton Police Department
- Monongah Police Department
- Montgomery Police Department
- Moorefield Police Department
- Morgantown Police Department
- Moundsville Police Department
- Mt. Hope Police Department
- Mullens Police Department
- New Cumberland Police Department
- New Haven Police Department
- New Martinsville Police Department
- Nitro Police Department
- Nutter Fort Police Department
- Oak Hill Police Department
- Oceana Police Department
- Paden City Police Department
- Parkersburg Police Department
- Parsons Police Department
- Paw Paw Police Department
- Pennsboro Police Department
- Petersburg Police Department
- Philippi Police Department
- Piedmont Police Department
- Pineville Police Department
- Poca Police Department
- Point Pleasant Police Department
- Pratt Police Department
- Princeton Police Department
- Rainelle Police Department
- Ranson Police Department
- Ravenswood Police Department
- Richwood Police Department
- Ridgeley Police Department
- Ripley Police Department]
- Romney Police Department
- Ronceverte Police Department
- Rowlesburg Police Department
- Salem Police Department
- Shepherdstown Police Department
- Shinnston Police Department
- Sistersville Police Department
- Smithers Police Department
- Sophia Police Department
- South Charleston Police Department
- Spencer Police Department
- St. Albans Police Department
- St. Marys Police Department
- Star City Police Department
- Stonewood Police Department
- Summersville Police Department
- Sutton Police Department
- Terra Alta Police Department
- Tridelphia Police Department
- Valley Grove Police Department
- Vienna Police Department
- War Police Department
- Wardensville Police Department
- Wayne Police Department
- Webster Springs Police Department]
- Weirton Police Department
- Welch Police Department
- Wellsburg Police Department
- West Liberty Police Department
- West Logan Police Department
- West Union Police Department
- Weston Police Department
- Westover Police Department
- Wheeling Police Department
- White Sulphur Springs Police Department
- Whitesville Police Department
- Williamson Police Department
- Williamstown Police Department
- Winfield Police Department

== College and university agencies ==
- Bluefield State College Department of Public Safety
- Bridge Valley Community and Technical College Police Department
- Concord University Police Department
- Fairmont State University Police Department
- Glenville State College Department of Public Safety
- Marshall University Police Department
- Mountwest Community and Technical College Department of Public Safety
- Shepherd University Police Department
- West Liberty University Police Department
- West Virginia University Parkersburg Police Department
- West Virginia University Potomac State College Police Department
- West Virginia University Police Department
- West Virginia University Institute of Technology Police Department
- West Virginia State University Department of Public Safety
- University of Charleston Department of Public Safety

== Defunct agencies ==
- Beverly Police Department
- Davis Police Department
- Elk Garden Police Department
- West Virginia Division of Juvenile Services
