= Appalachian Bible College =

Private religious college in West Virginia, U.S.

- Motto: Because life is for service
- Type: Private Bible college
- Established: 1950; 76 years ago
- President: Daniel L. Anderson
- Faculty: 13
- Students: 250
- Location: Mount Hope, West Virginia, United States; 37.852633°N 81.200117°W
- Campus: Suburban
- Sporting affiliations: NCCAA Division II – Mideast
- Mascot: Warriors
- Website: abc.edu

Appalachian Bible College is a private Bible college in Mount Hope, West Virginia. While unaffiliated with any particular denomination, it generally serves independent churches within the fundamental Bible and Baptist associations.

== History ==
The school was founded as Appalachian Bible Institute in 1950 by Lester E. Pipkin and Robert S. Guelich. Pipkin served as the school's first president until he was replaced by Daniel L. Anderson, current president, in the 1983. The school started as a Bible training institute for the youth of the Appalachian Mountains.

== Academics ==
All students who enroll in ABC's dual-major Bachelor of Arts program have one major in Bible and Theology and choose another ministry-related major. Additional programs include a Bible Certificate and an Associate of Arts. The school also offers online courses through ABC Connect, and on-campus modular classes for its Master of Arts in Ministry degree.

In 2014, ABC began offering accredited courses to inmates at Mount Olive Correctional Complex, West Virginia's maximum security prison. Mount Olive Bible College students are enrolled in the Pastoral ministry major. The first graduating class received Bachelor of Arts degrees in December 2018.

== Accreditation ==
ABC is accredited by both the Higher Learning Commission and the Association for Biblical Higher Education.

== Athletics ==
The Athletic Department of Appalachian Bible College is part of the National Christian College Athletic Association. Appalachian Bible College participates in the following intercollegiate sports:

- Men's basketball
- Men's soccer
- Women's basketball
- Women's volleyball

== Notable alumni ==
- Kenan Proffitt, environment artist and environment supervisor at Reel FX Animation Studios. Credits include set dressing on UglyDolls (2019), environment artist on Scoob! (2020), environment supervisor on Rumble (2021, a Paramount Animation and Reel FX film), environment set dressing on Back to the Outback (2021) and The Monkey King (2023), and environment supervisor on The SpongeBob Movie: Search for SquarePants (2025).
