= Denmar Correctional Center =

State prison

Coordinates: 38°05′10″N 80°13′16″W

- Interactive map of Denmar Correctional Center
- Location: 4319 Denmar Road Hillsboro, West Virginia
- Status: open
- Capacity: 235
- Opened: 1993
- Managed by: West Virginia Division of Corrections and Rehabilitation

The Denmar Correctional Center (DCC) is a state prison located near Hillsboro in Pocahontas County, West Virginia, USA.

Built on the site of the former Denmar Hospital (a facility for tuberculosis patients which closed in 1990), DCC was converted to a prison in 1993. A further building project was completed in 2000, including an Industries/Vocational Building.
