= Georgiana Goddard King =

American Hispanist and medievalist

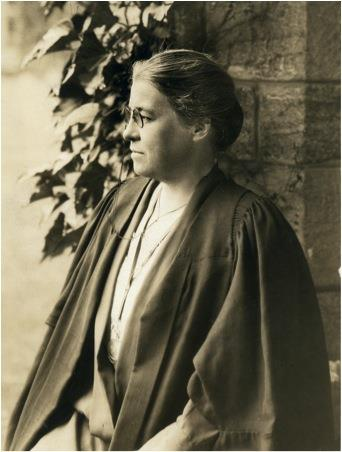
Professor Georgiana Goddard King at Bryn Mawr College (ca 1910)

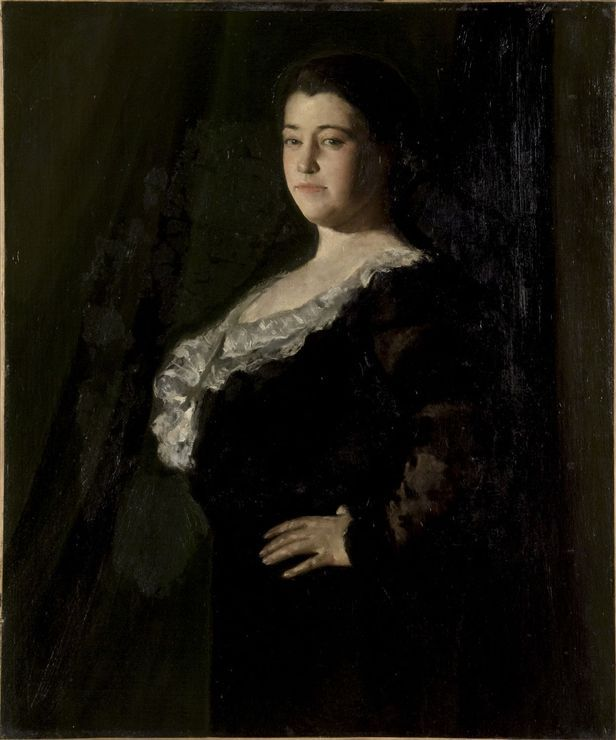
Georgiana Goddard King (1905), by Charles W. Hawthorne. Bryn Mawr College collection.

Georgiana Goddard King (August 5, 1871 – May 4, 1939) was an American pioneer Hispanist and medievalist, as well as a photographer and teacher at Bryn Mawr College, where she was educated (B.A. 1896), and later taught creating the Department of Art History, the first in the United States that specialized in Spanish art.

== Biography ==
King was born August 5, 1871, in West Columbia, West Virginia. She was a member of the Hispanic Society of America and of the Royal Galician Academy. She was a traveling companion of M. Carey Thomas and had a friendship with Gertrude Stein. King died on May 4, 1939, in Los Angeles, California, and is buried in the cloisters of Bryn Mawr College's Old Library (previously M. Carey Thomas Library and College Hall).

== Selected works ==
=== Books ===
- Comedies and Legends for Marionettes: A Theatre for Boys and Girls (1904)
- The Way of Perfect Love (1908).
- George Edmund Street, Some account of Gothic architecture in Spain (1914, edited and enlarged by Georgiana G. King)
- George Edmund Street, Unpublished notes and reprinted papers, with an essay by Georgiana Goddard King (1916)
- The Way of Saint James (1920)
- A Brief Account of the Military Orders in Spain (1921)
- The Play of the Sibyl Cassandra (1921)
- A Citizen of the Twilight (1921)
- Sardinian Painting (1923)
- Pre-Romanesque Churches of Spain (1924)
- Mudéjar (1927)

=== Articles ===
- "Early churches of Spain" in Bulletin of the Pan-American Union. Nov.- Dec., 1918.
- "Three unknown churches in Spain" in American Journal of Archaeology, Vol. XXII (1918).
- Spanish Abbeys (Washington, 1919).
- "The Cardona tomb at Bellpuig" in American Journal of Archaeology, Vol. XXV (1921).
- Some Churches in Galicia en Art Studies I (Nueva York, 1923).
- "Algunos rasgos de influjo oriental en la arquitectura espafiola de la Edad Media" in Arquitectura, Vol. V (1923)
- Fact and Inference in the Matter of Jamb Sculpture en Art Studies VI (Princeton, 1926).

=== In collaboration with others ===
- Heart of Spain (Cambridge, Harvard University Press, 1941)
- A Book of Bryn Mawr Stories (George W. Jacobs, 1901)

=== Photographs ===
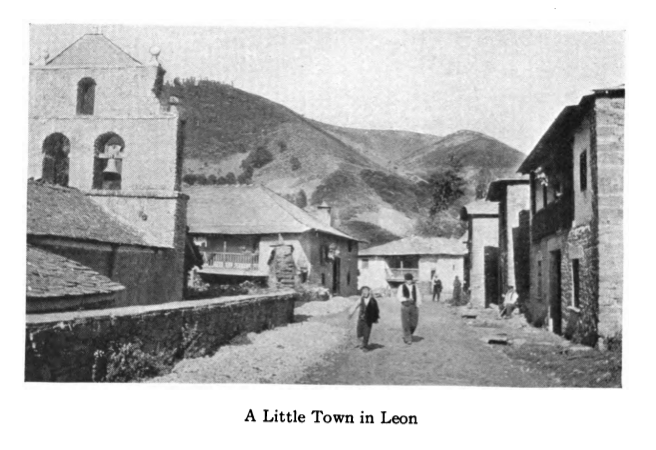

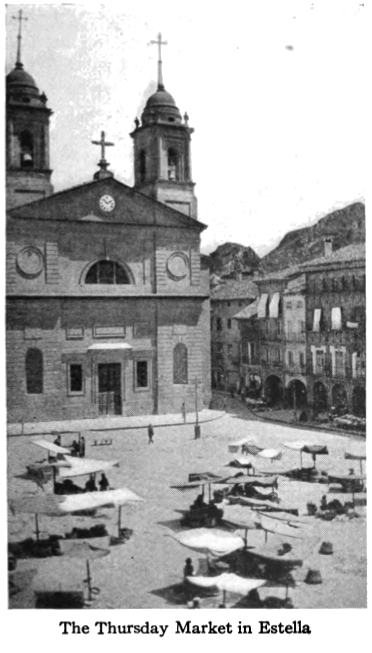

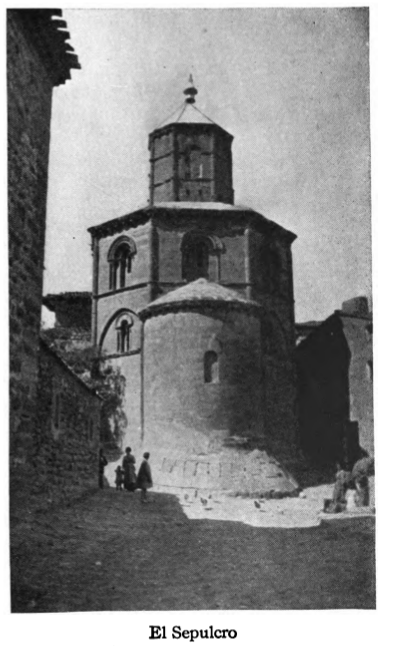

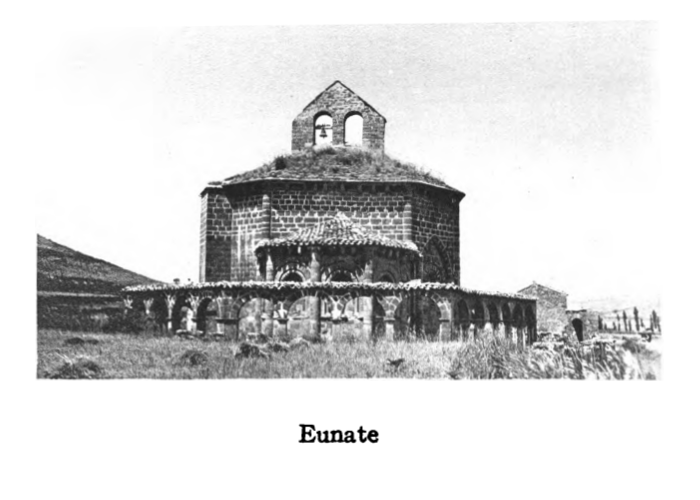

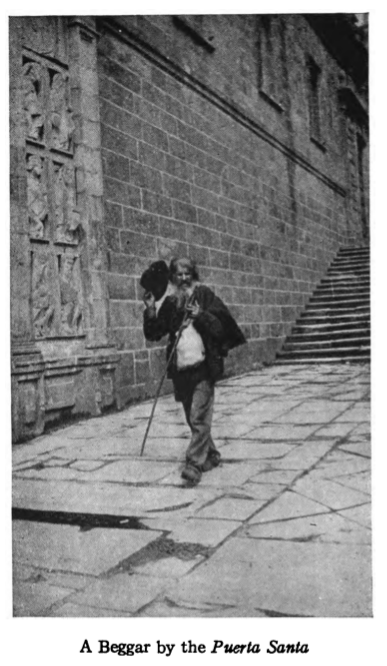

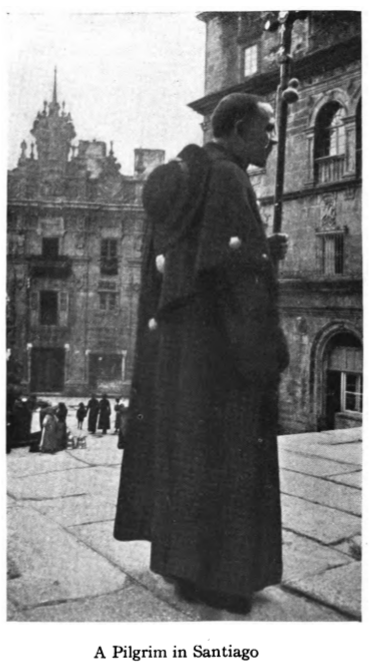

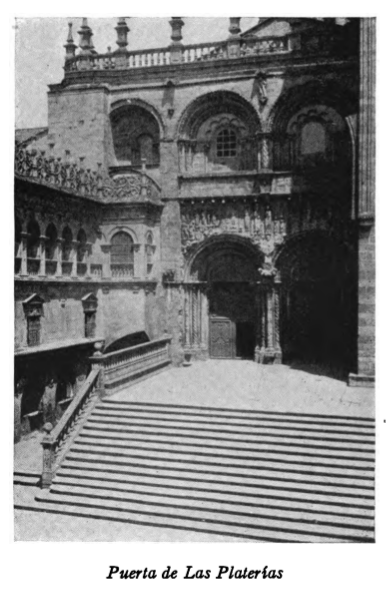

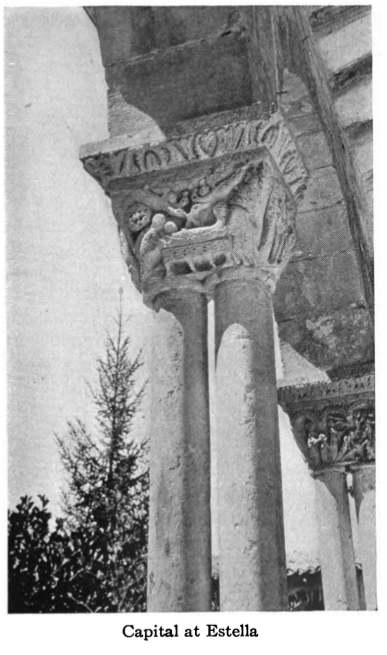

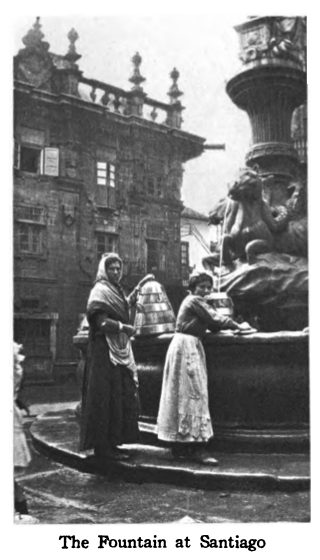
