= Ernest Barnard =

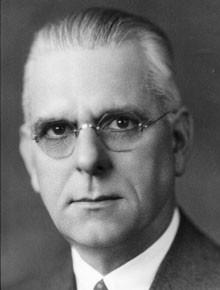
- Born: July 17, 1874; West Columbia, West Virginia, U.S.
- Died: March 27, 1931 (aged 56)
- Burial place: Knollwood Cemetery
- Employer: Major League Baseball (MLB)
- Organization: American League (AL)
- Title: President

Ernest Sargent Barnard (July 17, 1874 – March 27, 1931) was the third President of the American League, serving from 1927 until his death in 1931. Born in West Columbia, West Virginia, he later resided in Delaware, Ohio. He graduated from Otterbein College in 1895, and became football and baseball coach there until 1898. Moving to Columbus, Ohio, he became secretary of the local Builders Exchange, and coached football at Ohio Medical University. In 1900 he became sports editor for The Columbus Dispatch.

Hired by the Cleveland Indians in 1903, he served that club as traveling secretary (1903–1908), vice president and de facto general manager (1908–1916, 1918–1922), and president (1922–1927). During this time he often acted as a mediator between American League president Ban Johnson and Commissioner Kenesaw Mountain Landis. He served under the Indians first owner, Charles Somers, and under their second, Jim Dunn. Dunn had initially fired Barnard upon taking over in 1917. Realizing he'd made a mistake, Dunn brought Barnard back to the team in 1918. Barnard stayed on as president after Dunn's death in 1922, running the team for Dunn's widow and estate.

When AL owners removed Ban Johnson, the league's founder, from the league presidency in 1927, Barnard, after first clearing the way by arranging the sale of the Indians to a group headed by Alva Bradley, replaced Frank Navin who had served as acting president. Barnard was re-elected to a three-year term in December 9, 1930, but died suddenly three months later just prior to an examination at the Mayo Clinic in Rochester, Minnesota. Coincidentally, Johnson died just hours later.

Barnard was buried at Knollwood Cemetery in Cleveland.

== Bibliography ==
- Biographical Dictionary of American Sports, Greenwood Press (1987).
- Lee, Bill (2009). The Baseball Necrology: The Post-Baseball Lives and Deaths of Over 7,600 Major League Players and Others. Jefferson, N.C.: McFarland & Co. ISBN 9780786442393.
