= West Virginia Division of Corrections and Rehabilitation =

State agency of West Virginia

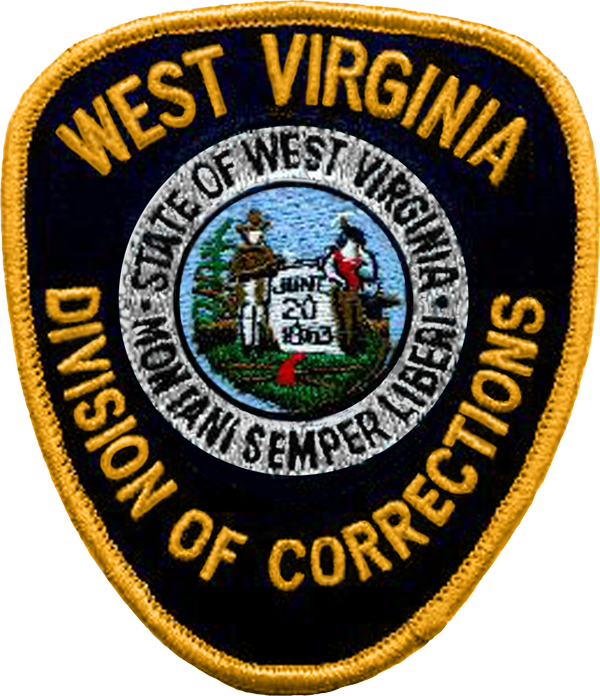

The West Virginia Division of Corrections is an agency of the U.S. state of West Virginia within the state Department of Homeland Security that operates the state's prisons, jails, and juvenile detention facilities. The agency has its headquarters in the state's capital of Charleston. The state incarcerates 273 women per 100,000 population, the highest rate of female incarceration in the world, ahead of all other states and foreign nations.

== History ==
On January 1, 1986 a two-day riot began at the West Virginia State Penitentiary resulted in three inmate deaths.

The Eastern Regional Jail in Martinsburg, the first of the state's 10 regional jails opened in May 1989. The regional jails would gradually replace the 55 county jails.

The former Salem Industrial Home for Youth was converted into an adult prison, the Salem Correctional Center, in 2015.

All of the division's facilities are overcrowded and understaffed. Press reports in late 2017 indicated the division was short three hundred correctional officers. Press reports in early 2018 showed that pay for correctional officers in the state ranked 49th in the nation. New correctional officers started at $24,664, about twelve dollars an hour.

From February to July 2018, National Guard troops supplemented the overworked officers. At the end of that period, the Fire Marshal's Office continued to support the division.

Until July 1, 2018, the agency was simply the "West Virginia Division of Corrections" and only operated the adult prisons. On July 1, 2018 the agency absorbed the former West Virginia Division of Juvenile Services and the former West Virginia Regional Jail Authority and assumed its current name.

== Facilities ==
=== Community Correctional Facilities ===
Name	Beds	City	County	Security level	Note	Cite
Anthony Correctional Center	204	Neola	Greenbrier County	minimum	Youthful Offender Facility	
Beckley Correctional Center	137	Beckley	Raleigh County	minimum	Work Release facility, male & female	
Charleston Correctional Center	128	Charleston	Kanawha County	minimum	Work Release facility, male & female	
Parkersburg Correctional Center and Wood County Holding Center	306	Parkersburg	Wood County	minimum	Work Release & Substance Abuse Treatment facility, male	

=== Adult Correctional Facilities ===
Name	Initials	City	County	Note	Cite
Denmar Correctional Center	DCC	Hillsboro	Pocahontas County	Medium (male)	
Huttonsville Correctional Center/Huttonsville Work Camp	HCC	Huttonsville	Randolph County	Close (male)	
Lakin Correctional Center	LCC	West Columbia	Mason County	All levels & intake facility (female)	
Martinsburg Correctional Center	MCC	Martinsburg	Berkeley County	Intake Facility (male)	
Mount Olive Correctional Complex/Slayton Work Camp	MOCC	Mount Olive	Fayette County	Maximum (male)	
Northern Correctional Facility	NCF	Moundsville	Marshall County	Close (male)	
Ohio County Correctional Center	OCCC	Wheeling	Ohio County	Minimum (male)	
Pruntytown Correctional Center	PCC	Grafton	Taylor County	Medium (male)	
St. Marys Correctional Center	SMCC	St. Marys	Pleasants County	Medium (male)	
Salem Correctional Center	SCC	Salem	Harrison County	All levels, (Male) intake Medium, (Male) Residents	

=== County Owned Contract Facilities ===
Name	City	County	Note	Cite
Stevens Correctional Center/McDowell County Corrections	Welch	McDowell County	Owned by the McDowell County Commission and contracted to house overflow state inmates.	

=== Regional Jails ===
Name	City	County	Opened	Counties Served	Cite
Central Regional Jail and Correctional Facility	Flatwoods	Braxton County	Feb. 1993	Braxton, Calhoun, Clay, Gilmer, Lewis, Nicholas, Roane, Webster	
Eastern Regional Jail and Corrections Facility	Martinsburg	Berkeley County	Sept. 1999	Berkeley, Jefferson, Morgan	
North Central Regional Jail and Correctional Facility	Greenwood	Doddridge County	Aug. 2001	Doddridge, Harrison, Marion, Monongalia, Pleasants, Ritchie, Tyler, Wirt, Wood	
Northern Regional Jail	Moundsville	Marshall County	Nov. 1994	Brooke, Hancock, Ohio, Wetzel	
Potomac Highlands Regional Jail and Correctional Facility	Augusta	Hampshire County	Feb. 2000	Grant, Hampshire, Hardy, Mineral, Pendleton	
South Central Regional Jail and Correctional Facility	Charleston	Kanawha County	July 1993	Jackson, Kanawha	
Southern Regional Jail and Correctional Facility	Beaver	Raleigh County	June 1994	Fayette, Greenbrier, Mercer, Monroe, Raleigh, Summers, Wyoming	
Southwestern Regional Jail and Correctional Facility	Holden	Logan County	April 1998	Boone, Logan, McDowell, Mingo	
Tygart Valley Regional Jail and Correctional Facility	Belington	Randolph County	Aug. 2005	Barbour, Pocahontas, Preston, Randolph, Taylor, Tucker, Upshur	
Western Regional Jail and Correctional Facility	Barboursville	Cabell County	Dec. 2003	Cabell, Lincoln, Mason, Putnam, Wayne	

=== Juvenile Correctional Facilities ===
Name	Beds	City	County	Security level	Note	Cite
Donald R. Kuhn Juvenile Center	48	Julian	Boone County	maximum		
Gene Spadaro Juvenile Center	23	Mount Hope	Fayette County	unknown		
J.M. "Chick" Buckbee Juvenile Center	24	Augusta	Hampshire County	unknown		
Kenneth “Honey” Rubenstein Juvenile Center	84	Davis	Tucker County	minimum		
Lorrie Yeager Jr. Juvenile Center	24	Parkersburg	Wood County	maximum		
Robert L. Shell Juvenile Diagnostic and Intake Center	23	Barboursville	Cabell County	unknown		
Ronald C. Mulholland Juvenile Center	26	Wheeling	Ohio County	unknown		
Sam Perdue Juvenile Center	unknown	Princeton	Mercer County	unknown		
James H. "Tiger" Morton Juvenile Center	23	Dunbar	Kanawha County	unknown		
Vicki V. Douglas Juvenile Center	23	Martinsburg	Berkeley & Jefferson Counties	unknown		

=== Youth Reporting Centers ===
Name	City	County	Counties Served	Note	Cite
Boone Logan County Youth Reporting Center	Madison	Boone County	Boone, Logan		
Brooke Hancock County Youth Reporting Center	Weirton	Hancock County	Brooke, Hancock		
Cabell County Youth Reporting Center	Huntington	Cabell County	Cabell		
Fayette County Youth Reporting Center	Oak Hill	Fayette County	Fayette		
Greenbrier County Youth Reporting Center	Lewisburg	Greenbrier County	Greenbrier		
Harrison County Youth Reporting Center	Clarksburg	Harrison County	Harrison		
Jefferson County Youth Reporting Center	Ranson	Jefferson County	Jefferson		
Kanawha County Youth Reporting Center	Charleston	Kanawha County	Kanawha		
Lincoln County Youth Reporting Center	Hamlin	Lincoln County	Lincoln		
Marion County Youth Reporting Center	Fairmont	Marion County	Marion		
Mason County Youth Reporting Center	Point Pleasant	Mason County	Mason		
Mercer County Youth Reporting Center	Princeton	Mercer County	Mercer		
Putnam County Youth Reporting Center	Winfield	Putnam County	Putnam		
STARS Berkeley County Youth Reporting Center	Martinsburg	Berkeley County	Berkeley, Jefferson, Morgan		
Wetzel Tyler County Youth Reporting Center	Paden City	Wetzel County	Wetzel, Tyler		
Wood County Youth Reporting Center	Vienna	Wood County	Wood		

== Fallen officers ==
Seven officers have died in the line of duty. One by assault, one by automobile crash, one by gunfire, and four by stabbing. Six of these officers were male and one was female.

== See also ==
- List of law enforcement agencies in West Virginia
- List of United States state correction agencies
- List of U.S. state prisons
- West Virginia Penitentiary
