= American League =

League within Major League Baseball

- Formerly: Western League
- Sport: Baseball
- Founded: Renamed to American League: October 11, 1899; 127 years ago in Chicago, Illinois; Proclaimed itself a major league: January 28, 1901; 125 years ago in Milwaukee, Wisconsin
- Founder: Ban Johnson
- President: vacant (honorary)
- Divisions: 3
- No. of teams: 15
- Countries: United States (14 teams); Canada (1 team)
- Most recent champion: Tampa Bay Rays (3rd title) (2026)
- Most titles: New York Yankees (41)

The American League of Professional Baseball Clubs, known simply as the American League (AL), is the younger of two leagues constituting Major League Baseball (MLB) in the United States and Canada. It developed from the Western League, a minor league based in the Great Lakes states, which eventually aspired to major league status. It is sometimes called the Junior Circuit because it claimed Major League status for the 1901 season, 25 years after the formation of the National League (the "Senior Circuit").

Since 1903, the American League champion has played in the World Series against the National League champion with only two exceptions: 1904, when the NL champion New York Giants refused to play their AL counterpart, and 1994, when a players' strike resulted in the cancellation of the Series. Through 2025, American League teams have won 68 of the 121 World Series played since 1903. The New York Yankees have won 27 World Series and 41 American League titles, the most in major league history. The Philadelphia/Kansas City/Oakland Athletics have won the second most AL titles with 15, followed by the Boston Red Sox with 14.

For decades, Major League baseball clubs only played teams from their own league during the regular season and playoffs, with only the two pennant winners meeting in the World Series. The AL and NL also employed and trained their own umpires, who only worked regular season games in their own league. These differences resulted in the leagues developing slightly different strategies and styles of play. The American League was usually regarded as the less "traditional" league during the 20th century, a reputation most exemplified by the introduction of the designated hitter rule in 1973, which encouraged AL managers to largely abandon "smallball" tactics. However, with the advent of free agency in the 1970s allowing for more player movement between leagues, the introduction of regular season interleague play in 1997, umpires working games across MLB beginning in 1999, and the NL's adoption of the designated hitter rule in 2022, the difference in play between the two major leagues has diminished considerably.

Though both leagues agreed to be jointly governed by a commissioner in 1920, they remained separate business entities with their own presidents and management. This was the case until after the 1999 season, when the American League legally merged with the National League under the auspices of Major League Baseball, which now operates much like other North American professional sports leagues, albeit with two "leagues" instead of "conferences".

== History ==
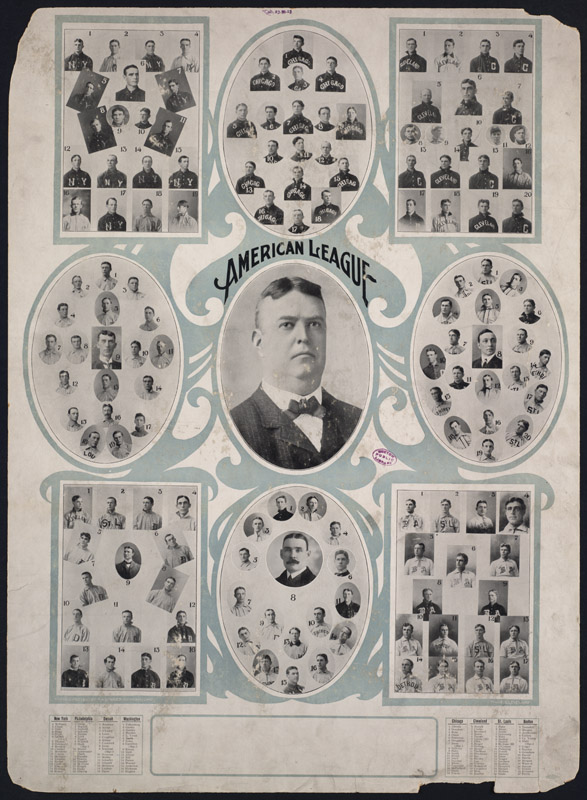
American League President and founder Ban Johnson, in center, surrounded by the portraits of the league's eight teams in 1907.

Originally a minor league known as the Western League, which existed from 1885 to 1899 with teams in mostly Great Lakes states, the league changed its name to the American League for the 1900 season and the next year developed into a second major league as a competitor to the older National League. This was prompted by the NL dropping four teams following the 1899 season after having absorbed its previous rival, the American Association, which disbanded in 1891 after ten seasons.

In its early history of the late 1880s, the minor Western League struggled until 1894, when Ban Johnson became the president of the league. Johnson pushed the league to rise to major league status, after the name change to the American League was decided in a league meeting in Milwaukee, Wisconsin, at the former Republican Hotel. A historical marker is at the intersection of North Dr. Martin Luther King Jr. Drive and West Kilbourn Avenue where the hotel once stood.

In March 1904, Johnson moved the league's headquarters from Chicago to New York.

Babe Ruth, noted as one of the most prolific hitters in Major League Baseball history, spent the majority of his career in the American League with the Boston Red Sox and the New York Yankees. From 1973 to 2022 The American League had one notable difference versus the rival National League, as it had the designated hitter rule. Under the rule, a team may use a batter in its lineup who is not in the field defensively, replacing the pitcher in the batting order, compared to the old rule that made it mandatory for the pitcher to bat. In the last two decades, the season schedule has allowed occasional interleague play. In 1969, the AL (and NL) were divided into East and West divisions, with a postseason playoff series for the pennant and the right to play in the World Series.

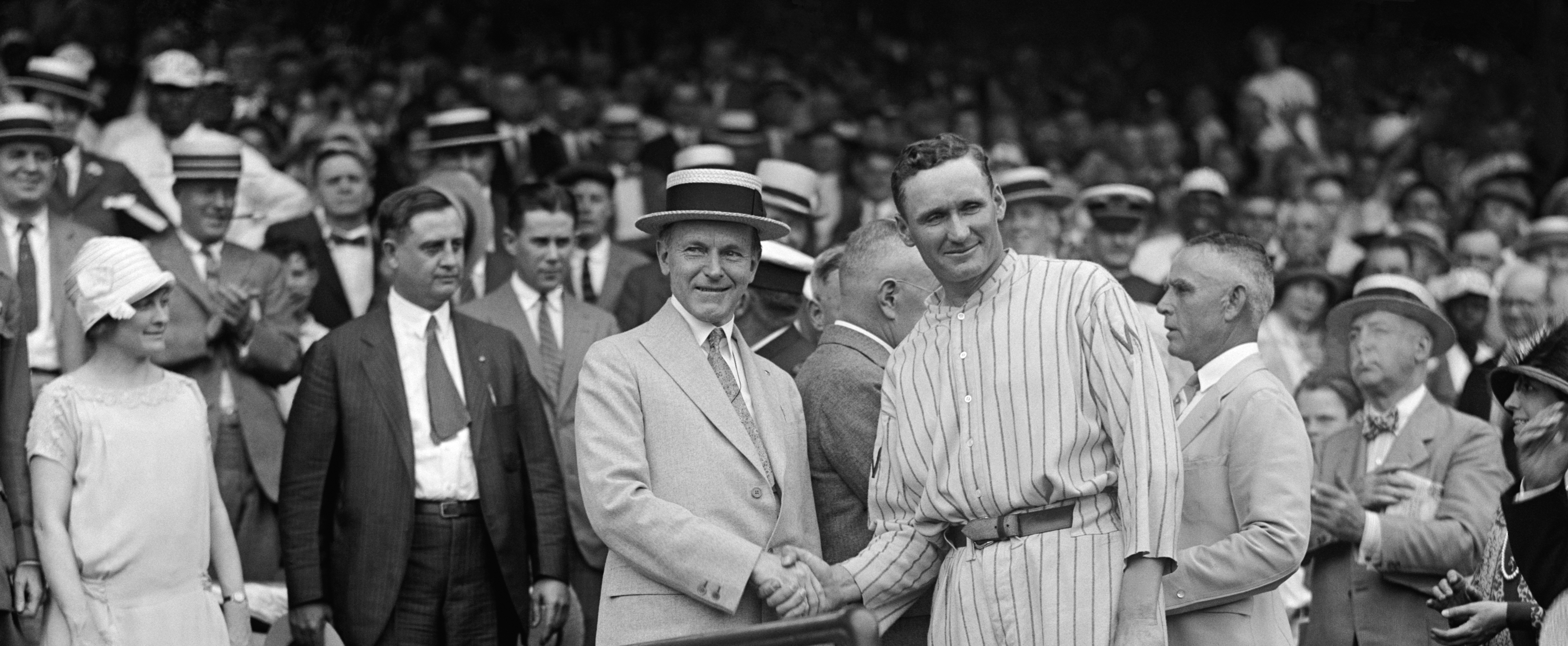
U.S. President Calvin Coolidge (1872–1933, served 1923–1929), and Washington Senators pitcher Walter Johnson (1887–1946, played 1907–1927, managed 1929–1932 for Senators; managed Cleveland Indians 1933–1935), shake hands following the Senators' 1924 American League championship at Griffith Stadium, Washington, D.C.

Until the late 1970s, league umpires working behind home plate wore large, balloon-style chest protectors worn outside the shirt or coat, while their colleagues in the National League wore chest protectors inside the shirt or coat. In 1977, new umpires (including Steve Palermo) had to wear the inside chest protector, although those on staff wearing the outside protector could continue to do so. Most umpires made the switch to the inside protector, led by Don Denkinger in 1975 and Jim Evans the next year, although several did not, including Bill Haller, Russ Goetz, George Maloney, Bill Kunkel and Jerry Neudecker, who became the last full-time MLB umpire to use the outside protector in 1985.

In 1994, the league, along with the National League, reorganized again, this time into three divisions (East, West, and Central) and added a third round to the playoffs in the form of the American League Division Series, with the best second-place team advancing to the playoffs as a wild-card team, in addition to the three divisional champions. In 1998, the newly franchised Tampa Bay Devil Rays joined the league, and the Arizona Diamondbacks joined the National League: i.e., each league added a fifteenth team. An odd number of teams per league meant that at least one team in each league would have to be idle on any given day, or alternatively, that odd team out would have had to play an interleague game against its counterpart in the other league. The initial plan was to have three five-team divisions per league with inter-league play year-round—possibly as many as 30 interleague games per team each year.

For various reasons, it soon seemed more practical to have an even number of teams in both leagues. The Milwaukee Brewers agreed to change leagues to become the National League's 16th team, moving from the AL Central to the NL Central. At the same time, the Detroit Tigers were moved from the AL East to the AL Central, making room for the Devil Rays in the East. Even after expansion, the American League then continued with 14 teams. This situation changed again in 2013 when the Houston Astros moved from the National League Central division to the American League West. The Astros had been in the NL for 51 years since beginning as an expansion team in 1962. Since their move, both leagues now consist of 15 teams.

=== Interleague play, and merger ===
For the first 96 years, American League teams faced their National League counterparts only in exhibition games or in the World Series. Beginning in 1997, interleague games have been played during the regular season and count in the standings. As part of the agreement instituting interleague play, the designated-hitter rule was used only in games where the American League team is the home team, until the 2022 season, when the universal DH rule was implemented. In 2023, American League teams played 46 regular season interleague games against all 15 National League teams, 23 at home and 23 on the road.

In 2000, the American League ended its status as a legally independent entity when the American and National Leagues were both merged into the legal entity Major League Baseball (MLB). This left MLB as a single league, divided into two parts, also called leagues. This change in legal status had no effect on play, scheduling, and so forth.

== Teams ==
=== Charter franchises ===
There were eight charter teams in 1901, the league's first year as a major league, and the next year the original Milwaukee Brewers (not to be confused with the current Milwaukee Brewers) moved to St. Louis to become the St. Louis Browns, and the year after the New York Highlanders replaced the disbanded original Baltimore Orioles. Those eight franchises constituted the league for 52 seasons until the Browns moved to Baltimore and took up the Orioles name. The eight original teams and their counterparts in the "Classic Eight" were:

- Original Baltimore Orioles (not to be confused with the current Baltimore Orioles, see Milwaukee Brewers) folded after the 1902 season, and was replaced by the New York team that began play in 1903. The New York franchise was nicknamed "Highlanders", "Americans", and "Yankees" until the last became official in 1913.
- Boston Americans (became the Boston Red Sox in 1908)
- Chicago White Stockings (name shortened to White Sox in 1904)
- Cleveland Blues (became the Cleveland Indians in 1915 and the Cleveland Guardians in 2022)
- Detroit Tigers (name and locale unchanged from 1894 forward)
- Original Milwaukee Brewers (became the St. Louis Browns in 1902 and the current Baltimore Orioles in 1954)
- Philadelphia Athletics (became the Kansas City Athletics in 1955, the Oakland Athletics in 1968, and the Athletics in 2025)
- Original Washington Senators (became the Minnesota Twins in 1961)

=== Expansion, renaming, and relocation summary ===
- 1902: Original Milwaukee Brewers moved to St. Louis, renamed St. Louis Browns
- 1902: Cleveland Bluebirds/Blues players attempted to adopt the nickname Cleveland Bronchos, which failed to catch on
- 1903: New York Highlanders replaced original Baltimore Orioles; dubbed "Highlanders" by press after their field, Hilltop Park, and "Yankees" as an alternate form of "Americans"
- 1903: Chicago White Stockings officially renamed Chicago White Sox
- 1903: Cleveland Blues/Bronchos renamed Cleveland Naps via newspaper poll, after star Nap Lajoie
- 1905: Washington Senators renamed Washington Nationals; Senators name continued to be used by media
- 1908: Boston Americans (informal nickname) formally named Boston Red Sox
- 1913: New York Highlanders nickname dropped in favor of already-established alternative, New York Yankees
- 1915: Cleveland Naps renamed Cleveland Indians
- 1954: St. Louis Browns move to Baltimore, renamed Baltimore Orioles
- 1955: Philadelphia Athletics move to Kansas City
- 1957: Washington Nationals/Senators formally renamed Washington Senators
- 1961: Washington Senators move to Minneapolis-St. Paul, renamed Minnesota Twins
- 1961: Los Angeles Angels and new Washington Senators enfranchised.
- 1965: Los Angeles Angels renamed California Angels in late-season on September 2, 1965. For the following season, the Angels moved within the Los Angeles metropolitan area from the city of Los Angeles to the Orange County suburb of Anaheim.
- 1968: Kansas City Athletics move to Oakland
- 1969: Kansas City Royals and Seattle Pilots enfranchised.
- 1970: Seattle Pilots move to Milwaukee, renamed Milwaukee Brewers. (Four years earlier, in 1966, the National League's Milwaukee Braves had moved to Atlanta.)
- 1972: Washington Senators move to the Dallas–Fort Worth metroplex, renamed Texas Rangers
- 1973: Oakland Athletics renamed Oakland A's
- 1977: Seattle Mariners and Toronto Blue Jays enfranchised
- 1980: Oakland A's officially renamed Oakland Athletics
- 1997: California Angels renamed Anaheim Angels. The change came more than 30 years after the team's move to Anaheim.
- 1998: Tampa Bay Devil Rays, representing Tampa-St. Petersburg, enfranchised
- 1998: Milwaukee Brewers transfer from the American League to the National League. (See above.)
- 2005: Anaheim Angels renamed Los Angeles Angels of Anaheim
- 2008: Tampa Bay Devil Rays renamed Tampa Bay Rays
- 2013: Houston Astros moved from the National League.
- 2016: Los Angeles Angels of Anaheim renamed Los Angeles Angels
- 2022: Cleveland Indians renamed Cleveland Guardians
- 2025: Oakland Athletics renamed Athletics following temporary relocation to West Sacramento, California

=== Current teams ===
Locations of AL teams for the 2026–present MLB seasons
West Central East

==== American League East ====
- Baltimore Orioles enfranchised 1894 as the Milwaukee Brewers, moved to St. Louis (1902) and to Baltimore (1954)
- Boston Red Sox enfranchised 1901, nicknamed the Americans (adopted name Red Sox in 1908)
- New York Yankees enfranchised 1903, replacing the original Baltimore Orioles, nicknamed the Highlanders ("Highlanders" dropped out of use after move to the Polo Grounds in 1913; officially adopted alternate nickname Yanks/Yankees by 1923)
- Tampa Bay Rays enfranchised 1998 as the Tampa Bay Devil Rays (team name changed in 2008)
- Toronto Blue Jays enfranchised 1977

==== American League Central ====
- Chicago White Sox enfranchised 1894 as the Sioux City Cornhuskers, moved to St. Paul (1895) and to Chicago (1900)
- Cleveland Guardians enfranchised 1896 as the Columbus Buckeyes, moved to Grand Rapids (July 1899) and to Cleveland (1900)
- Detroit Tigers enfranchised 1894
- Kansas City Royals enfranchised 1969
- Minnesota Twins enfranchised 1894 as the Kansas City Blues, moved to Washington (1901), and to Minneapolis-St. Paul (1961)

==== American League West ====
- Athletics enfranchised 1901 (Note: See commentary on Western League page. The Indianapolis and Minneapolis teams were replaced by teams in Baltimore and Philadelphia in 1901, but it is unclear and disputed as to which team went where.) in Philadelphia, moved to Kansas City (1955), Oakland (1968), and to West Sacramento (2025)
- Houston Astros enfranchised 1962 in National League as the Houston Colt .45s (team changed name to Astros in 1965), transferred to American League (2013)
- Los Angeles Angels enfranchised 1961 as the Los Angeles Angels, then as the California Angels after moving to Anaheim (1966), then the Anaheim Angels (1997), then the Los Angeles Angels of Anaheim (2005). This last remains the legal name of the franchise, but in actual practice, the team is known as the Los Angeles Angels, officially so since 2016
- Seattle Mariners enfranchised 1977
- Texas Rangers enfranchised 1961 as the Washington Senators, moved to the Dallas–Fort Worth metroplex (1972)

== Timeline ==
The first line is the transformation of the American League (AL) to a major league in 1901. The second line is the beginning of the expansion era in 1961. The third line marks the legal merger of the American and National Leagues into a single Major League Baseball in 2000.

World Series championships are shown with a "•", American League Pennants before the World Series are shown with a "#", and American League Pennants who lost the World Series are shown with a "^". No World Series was played in 1904, so the pennant winners for each league are indicated. Due to the 1994–95 Major League Baseball strike, there were no pennant or World Series winners in 1994, so this year is left blank.

- Prior to 1901, only teams from the Western League (WL) that established the AL are shown.

== Presidents ==
Following the 1999 season, the American and National Leagues were merged with Major League Baseball, and the leagues ceased to exist as business entities. The position of the American League President and National League President became honorary.

Key
†	Member of the Baseball Hall of Fame
*	Honorary President

Name	Years	Ref
Ban Johnson^{†}	1901–1927	
Frank Navin	1927	
Ernest Barnard	1927–1931	
Will Harridge^{†}	1931–1959	
Joe Cronin^{†}	1959–1973	
Lee MacPhail^{†}	1973–1984	
Bobby Brown	1984–1994	
Gene Budig	1994–1999	
Jackie Autry*	2000–2015	
Frank Robinson^{†}*	2015–2019	

== See also ==
- List of American League pennant winners
- American League Championship Series (ALCS)
- American League Division Series (ALDS)
- List of American League Wild Card winners

== Sources ==
- The National League Story, Lee Allen, Putnam, 1961.
- The American League Story, Lee Allen, Putnam, 1962.
- The Baseball Encyclopedia, published by MacMillan, 1968 and later.
