= West Virginia Alcohol Beverage Control Administration =

The West Virginia Alcohol Beverage Control Administration (ABCA) is the alcoholic beverage control state authority in the U.S. state of West Virginia. The agency is sometimes incorrectly referred to as the ABCC or ABC.

The Administration was created in 1935 after the repeal of the state's alcohol prohibition amendment, and for fifty six years, maintained a monopoly on wholesale and retail sales of liquor in the state. On February 27, 1990, Senate Bill 337 was passed, which discontinued the retail sale of alcohol by the state. In 1990 and 1991, 214 state-owned liquor stores were sold, and profits of $26,500,000 were transferred by the ABCA to the state's general fund.

The agency has three primary functions:

1) Processing liquor law applications

2) Enforcement of liquor law regulations

3) Educating the public about alcohol abuse

The agency often makes routine surprise inspections of bars in the state to look for violations. The agency also works closely with law enforcement agencies especially in the college towns of Huntington, WV (Marshall University) and Morgantown, WV (West Virginia University).

== See also ==
- List of law enforcement agencies in West Virginia
