= Jackie Autry =

American baseball executive, former banker, and widow of Gene Autry (born 1941)

- Digital portrait illustrating the likeness of Jackie Autry (Jacqueline Evelyn Ellam)
- Pronunciation: /dʒæki ɒtri/
- Born: Jacqueline Evelyn Ellam; October 2, 1941 (age 84); Newark, New Jersey, U.S.
- Education: University of California at Berkeley
- Occupation: Banker
- Known for: Former owner of the Los Angeles Angels of Anaheim and former Honorary American League President (2000–2015)
- Title: Honorary American League President
- Term: 2000–2015
- Predecessor: Gene Budig
- Successor: Frank Robinson
- Spouse: Gene Autry (m. 1981; died 1998)

Jackie Autry (née Jacqueline Ellam; born October 2, 1941) is an American baseball executive, former banker, and widow of the performer Gene Autry. Although currently serving as Founding Chair and Life Trustee of the Autry Museum of the American West, she has also held executive positions in several other organizations, such as the Gene Autry Music Group, Flying A Pictures, the Autry Foundation, the Community Blood Bank of the Desert, and more. Autry prides herself as a recovered alcoholic, then becoming one of the only women to serve on the Major League Baseball Executive Council, Oversight Committee, and Board of Directors.

== Early life ==
Autry was born Jacqueline Evelyn Ellam in Newark, New Jersey, on October 2, 1941, and promptly moved to Ironia, New Jersey where she was raised. In 1959, she moved to California to pursue a major in Physical Education and minor in History from the University of California at Berkeley.

During her time in California, Autry became involved with the Security Pacific National Bank where she began as a switchboard operator. It was here that she first gained experience in banking and management and met Gene Autry, her future husband, during his visit to this bank when he purchased Holiday Inn at Palm Springs in 1963.

== Career ==
=== Security First National Bank ===
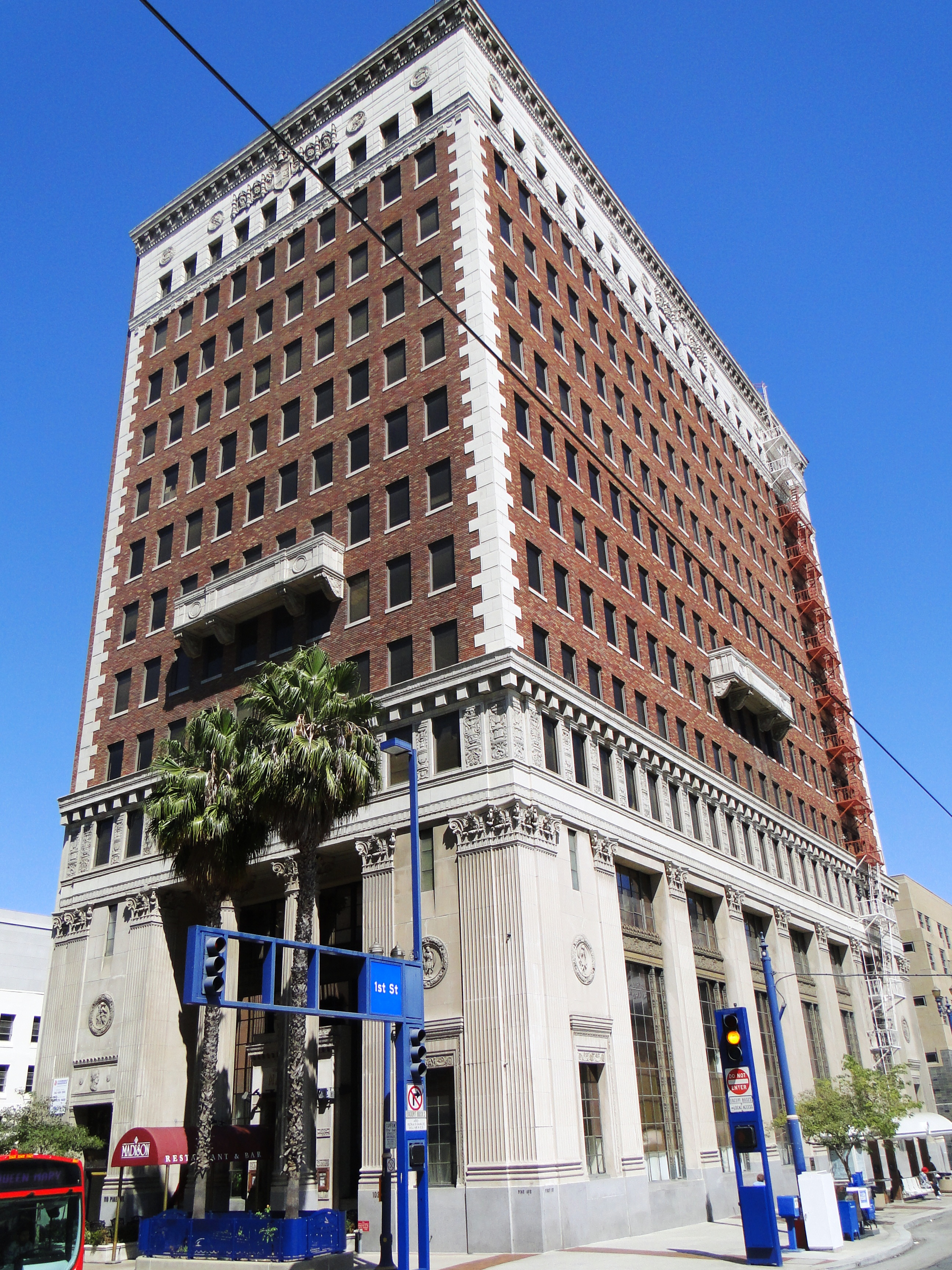
Security Pacific National Bank Building in Downtown Long Beach, constructed 1924

Following her position as a switchboard operator for Security First National Bank, Autry was eventually promoted to Assistant Manager of Operations in 1965. Over the next several years, she continued this career with the goal of becoming manager. In 1967, Security First National Bank bought Pacific National Bank of San Francisco and became Security Pacific National Bank. Autry was then promoted to manager in 1971. She continued serving as manager of the bank until she was eventually appointed as vice president in 1973. Autry dedicated an additional 8 years to the bank as the vice president, until eventually retiring from the position in 1981.

=== Major League Baseball ===
After her marriage with Gene Autry on July 19, 1981, Autry became increasingly interested in the practicalities baseball management and its organization. Upon investigating the statements for the Angels in 1982, she was troubled by the team's financial situation, encouraging Gene to become more involved. In 1983, when her husband acquired 100% ownership of the Los Angeles Angels, they decided to commit themselves to the team and its success. To exemplify this dedication, Gene Autry sold his interest in KTLA to purchase the remaining shares of the Angels.

But . . . it was our intention, both Gene’s and mine, that the team remain a part of the Autry family as long as possible. One of the things that we both agreed to when we sold KTLA was that if the ballteam could not break even and carry itself, we might have to consider selling it. I think that would be true of any business that we had. Neither Gene nor myself are in baseball to make money. But we’re not in baseball to lose money, either.

— Jackie Autry, in Gene Wojciechowski, "JACKIE AUTRY : After Facing Her Problem, She’s Back in Training", Los Angeles Times (1987)

Jackie and Gene Autry continued there management of the Angels for the next several years. In 1996, the Walt Disney Company purchased preliminary controlling rights. Inspired by her leadership and expertise in the banking world, Jackie Autry became more involved in the decision making process and eventually took over as Chairman of the Angels following the death of her husband, Gene, in 1998. As a result of the rapidly changing baseball business world, she sold the remaining shares of the Angels to the Walt Disney Company, but continued to support and follow the team closely.

In 2000, Autry eventually served as the honorary president of Major League Baseball's American League, from 2000 until 2015. Her main task was to present the William Harridge Trophy to the champion at the end of the American League Championship Series (ALCS) as well as the ALCS Most Valuable Player award. Autry is the only woman to ever serve on the Major League Baseball Executive Council, on its oversight committee, and as a member of the MLB board of directors.

=== Other Involvement ===
Autry served as a president of the American Red Cross and was responsible for raising funding to build an independent Community Blood Bank at the Eisenhower Medical Center. The blood bank continues to serve seven area hospitals surrounding the Palm Springs area. She continues to serve on the board of trustees at Eisenhower Medical Center and is the longest-tenured trustee, having served since 1981. She is also a current member of the board of directors of the Barbara Sinatra Children's Center and has participated significantly in raising funds during National Child Abuse Prevention Month.

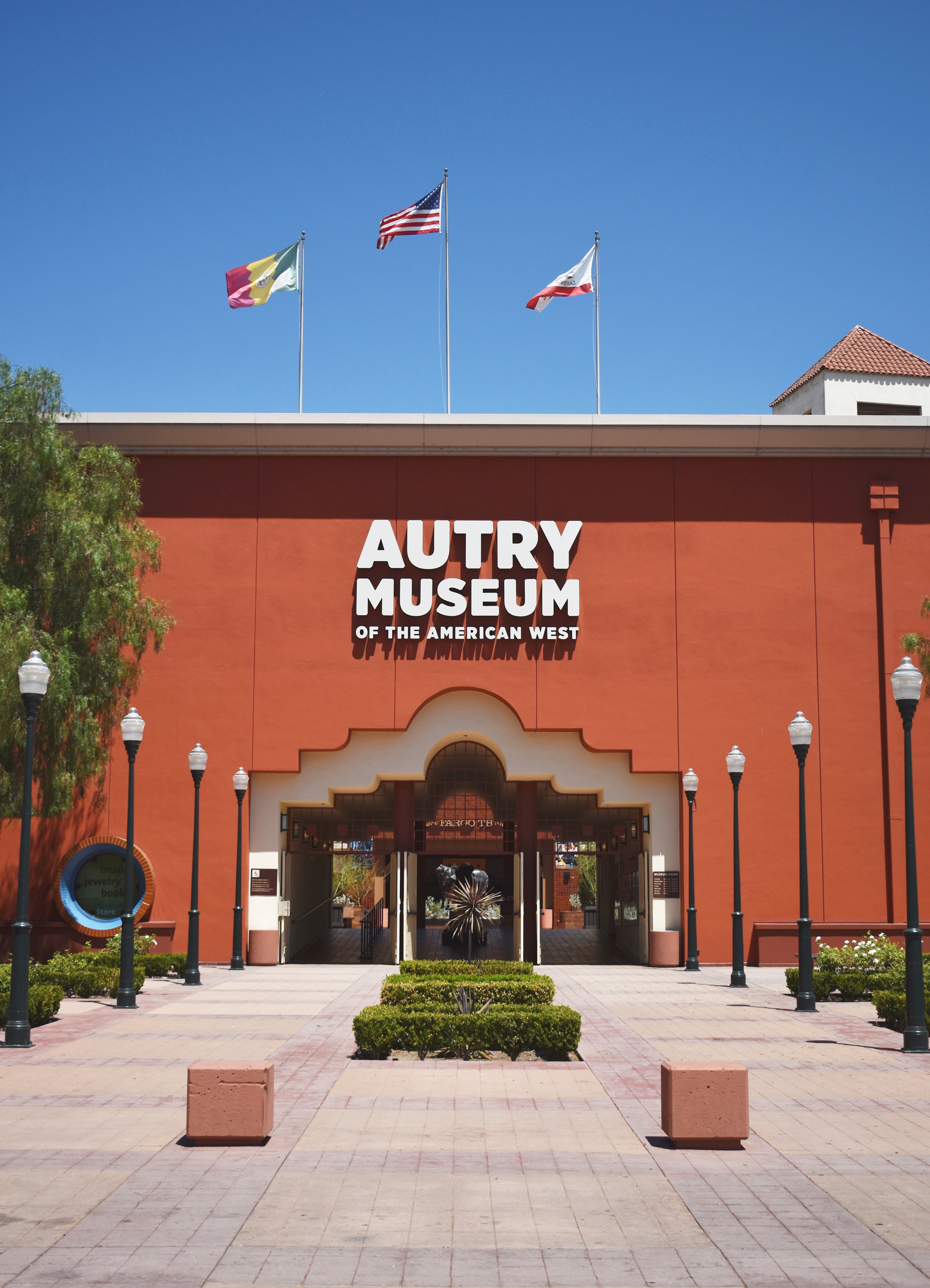
Front entrance to the Autry Museum of the American West in Griffith Park, renovated in 2013

She is President of The Autry Foundation, which was established by Ina and Gene Autry. The Autry Foundation provided the funds to build a world class western history museum contiguous to the Los Angeles Zoo. The 148,000 sq ft (13,700 m^{2}) museum, now called the Autry Museum of the American West and included the, now closed, Southwest Museum of the American Indian as well as the Institute for the Study of the American West. After 13 years, she retired as board chairman and now holds the position of chairman Emeritus and Lifetime Director.

She has also held executive positions in several other organizations, such as the Gene Autry Music Group and Flying A Pictures.

== Personal life ==
During her time as both a banker and baseball executive, Autry has expressed a desire to remain out of the public eye. Over the course of their 10 year marriage, Jackie only joined Gene on the baseball field once for a birthday celebration. As the last wife of Gene Autry, Jackie was 34 years younger than him and unsure about the exact nature of their relationship, but continues to express joy and pride being at his side. In a Sunday Morning interview she stated, "Somebody said to me, 'If you had to describe your relationship with your husband?' I would say my husband was my best friend. He was my pal. My buddy. My lover. And my child," she said. "All in one person."

In 1997, Autry bought an Old Las Palmas estate in Palm Springs for $2.05 million from Glen A. Larson, which was originally designed for and owned by Mrs. Frederick Stevens of Buffalo, New York. This remained one of her main residencies for much of her life, where she continued living after Gene's death and spent much time improving. Now in semi-retirement, Autry handles investment portfolios, continues to attend Angels baseball games, and enjoys traveling and representing the legacy of Gene.

=== Struggle with Alcoholism ===
Mainly attributed to the growing pressure and expectations of her career in baseball and banking, Autry has struggled with alcoholism for much of her adult life. Although there are no accounts of this harming her relationships or career, Autry felt she had been living in denial of her alcoholism and eventually chose to enroll in an Alcoholics Anonymous (AA) rehabilitation program. Part of her struggle first seeking support is due to Gene's alleged disregard of her alcoholism. Although supportive, Gene never accepted that Jackie should be considered an alcoholic.

Autry completed her rehabilitation program on June 2, 1985, at the Betty Ford Center at Eisenhower Medical Center in Rancho Mirage. Her rehabilitation was partially sponsored by Betty Ford, who was celebrating her own recovery from a prescription drug addiction. Autry's recovery encouraged her to become more involved in business and is considered, by her, as a pivotal moment in her life.

=== Recent Developments ===
In 2010, Autry was involved in the collision and death of a houseless person in Palm Springs. Autry accidentally struck the man with her car, but Autry was not cited or arrested and no charges are expected. Autry described the incident as a "horrible" accident.

On April 29, 2019, Autry listed her 88.5 acre horse ranch property in Anza for sale at $900,000 through a family trust. Once a horse farm, the property now includes a 1938 manager home, a 1951 stick built house, and a 1987 residence.

On February 13, 2020, Autry's Palm Springs estate was listed for sale at $8.25 million. This followed her desire to downsize and find a smaller home in the same area. Autry made several improvements to the home, many inspired by environmentally sustainable sentiments. These include solar panels, artificial turf, and xeriscaping. She also added a guest suite, tennis court, garage, and outdoor kitchen.
