= West Virginia State Police =

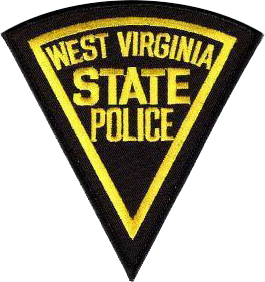
- Patch of West Virginia State Police
- Abbreviation: WVSP

Agency overview
- Formed: June 29, 1919; 107 years ago
- Preceding agency: West Virginia Department of Public Safety
- Employees: 1454 (as of 2019)

Jurisdictional structure
- Operations jurisdiction: West Virginia, USA
- Area: 24,230 square miles (62,800 km^{2})
- Population: 1,784,787 (2021 est.)
- Legal jurisdiction: West Virginia
- Governing body: Government of West Virginia
- General nature: Civilian police

Operational structure
- Headquarters: South Charleston, West Virginia
- State Troopers: 628 (as of 2019)
- Civilian members: 383 (as of 2019)
- Agency executive: J. L. Mitchell, Superintendent-Colonel
- Parent agency: West Virginia Department of Homeland Security
- Troops: 8
- Detachments: 60

Website
- Official website

The West Virginia State Police (WVSP) is a state law enforcement agency in the United States that provides police services to the residents of West Virginia. It is the fourth-oldest state police agency in the US. The WVSP was disbanded due to their involvement in quelling of the uprisings on behalf of the coal and mine companies which were surrounding the concept of organized labor in the coal and mine industries. The WVSP was then reorganized as the Department of Public Safety in the second extraordinary session of the West Virginia Legislature on June 19, 1919, as a result of their involvement.

== History ==
West Virginia State Police troop commands

The West Virginia State Police was first formed in 1919, at the direction of Governor John Jacob Cornwell, who deemed that a state-level law enforcement agency "was mandatory in order for him to uphold the laws of our state." Part of the compromise was the name of the organization: "West Virginia Department of Public Safety" was the official name until 1995 when the name was changed to "West Virginia State Police" during the legislative session.

== Today ==
Like other state law enforcement agencies, West Virginia troopers enforce traffic laws statewide, investigate crimes and protect the governor and his immediate family. The superintendent of the West Virginia State Police is Colonel James L. Mitchell.

West Virginia State Police troopers wear a forest-green uniform and campaign hat. They receive their training at the West Virginia State Police Academy located in Institute, a suburb of Charleston, and near the agency's headquarters in South Charleston. Upon appointment, cadets undergo an intense training program at the State Police Academy.

The West Virginia State Police also runs its own forensic laboratory and provides scientific investigation services to law enforcement agencies across the state. Services offered to criminal justice agencies include biochemistry, drug, firearm investigations, latent prints, questioned documents, toxicology and trace evidence. The crime lab is accredited by the American Society of Crime Laboratory Directors/Laboratory Accreditation Board (ASCLD/LAB).

In 2023, an anonymous letter to Governor Jim Justice became public that alleged sexual assaults, thefts, and damage to state-owned property at the state police academy, instigating a major investigation. The whistleblower was arrested on alleged charges for battery and strangulation.

== Recruitment and training ==
The West Virginia Division of Criminal Justice Services is responsible for setting minimum physical ability standards for police officers working in the state. In 2007, following a national trend, it relaxed the physical ability standards for aspiring police officers. Right now, any police applicant must do at least 27 push-ups/minute, 29 sit-ups/minute and be able to run 1.5 miles (2.4 km) in a maximum time limit of 14 minutes 53 seconds. The State Police, however, chose not to follow those standards unlike most local police agencies in West Virginia. The agency's recruiters still require applicants to perform at least 27 push-ups/minute, 29 sit-ups/minute and those same applicants have to run 1.5 miles (2.4 km) in no more than 14 minutes 52 seconds, which were all the initial minimum requirements for all police departments in West Virginia.

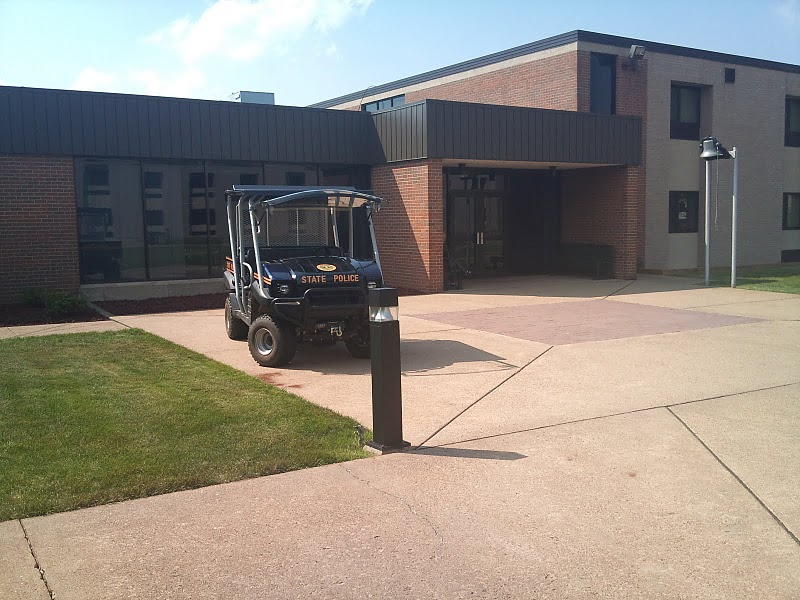
The West Virginia State Police Academy in Institute

Training at the paramilitary academy lasts about 25 weeks compared to about 16 weeks for officers from other departments (trained at the same academy). When cadets graduate, they are promoted to the rank of "Trooper." They can be stationed anywhere in the 55 West Virginia counties working from detachments (barracks). They serve an eighteen-month probationary period that starts at the time they enter the academy. After successfully completing that probationary period, they are eligible to receive an associate degree in police sciences through the Marshall Technical and Community College program.

== Personnel ==
The State Police has struggled with staffing issues for many years and the problem seems to persist mainly due to lack of funding to dramatically increase the number of road troopers. As of 2013, the agency employed well above 600 sworn officers, making it de facto the largest law enforcement agency in the state. The State Police is heavily relied upon to assist in many of the 55 West Virginia counties. In September 2013, news organizations started reporting a new initiative from the agency to increase manpower. The Accelerated Cadet Program targets local West Virginia police officers who want to join the State Police. Once hired, such officers would train for only 11 weeks, instead of the 25 weeks normal cadets go through.

The State Police is and has been the only agency to operate a law enforcement academy in West Virginia. The state police academy trains West Virginia State Police Troopers and all county and local police departments in the state.

== Rank structure ==
Title	Insignia
Superintendent - Colonel	
Lieutenant Colonel	
Major	
Captain	
First Lieutenant	
Second Lieutenant	
First Sergeant	
Sergeant	
Corporal	
Senior Trooper	
Trooper First Class	
Trooper	No insignia

== Vehicles ==
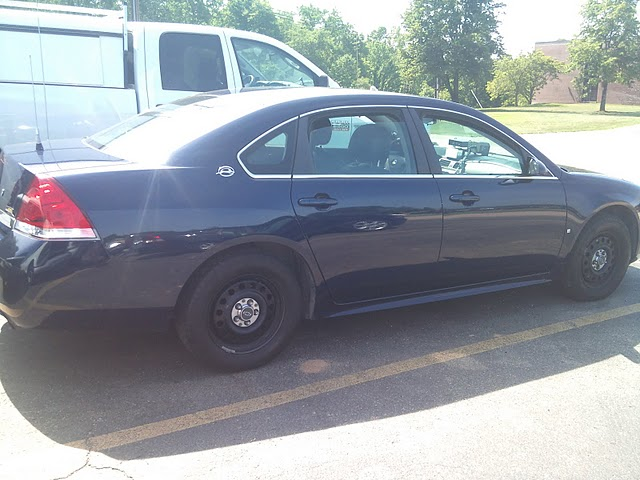
An unmarked Chevy Impala parked at the West Virginia State Police Academy

State Police vehicles are composed of a variety of makes with blue and gold colors accompanied by the agency's logo on the side front doors. For many years, the agency has used Ford Crown Victorias for the road. In recent years, however, the West Virginia State Police has phased out Chevy Impalas and the Ford Police Interceptors (Police equivalent of the Ford Taurus) as well as Ford Crown Victorias. As of 2024, WVSP primarily utilizes both marked and unmarked variants of the Ford Police Interceptor Utility and the new Chevrolet Tahoe. The agency also uses unmarked vehicles that are usually assigned to command staff members; however, certain traffic units use unmarked (typically light blue) Ford Expeditions. Vehicles are mainly equipped with blue LED lights and red and amber LED lights in the rear.

Special WVSP vehicles include extended Ford Transit vans as crime scene units, motorcycles, and a small aviation fleet consisting of two helicopters. There are also several Ford F-250s used as multipurpose units. The State Police also manages sport vehicles mostly used for public relations and recruitment.

The West Virginia State Police possesses a vehicle inventory of approximately 974 vehicles statewide.

== Weapons ==
Troopers are issued the .45 ACP Smith & Wesson 4566TSW, a version of the Smith & Wesson Model 4506. It has a bobbed hammer and blue metal finish. Each WVSP 4566TSW has the agency name and shoulder patch engraved. Each Trooper is issued an attachable flashlight which mounts to their pistol.

As of December 2018, Troopers are now using Glock 17 Gen 5 9mm handguns.

== Organization ==
- Cabinet Secretary
- Superintendent of the State Police
  - Deputy Superintendent
    - Executive Services
      - Media Relations Unit
      - Personnel Unit
      - Medical Unit
    - Staff Services
      - Accounting Unit
      - Communications Unit
      - Criminal Records Unit
      - Forensic Laboratory
      - Planning and Research Unit
      - Procurement Unit
      - Promotional Standards Unit
      - Traffic Records Unit
      - Training Academy
      - Uniform Crime Reporting Unit
    - Professional Standards
    - Legal Services
    - Field Operations
      - Field Troops 1 - 8
      - Bureau of Criminal Investigations
        - Regional Offices 1 - 6
        - Investigative Support Services
          - Insurance Fraud Unit
          - Polygraph Unit
          - Drug Diversion Unit
          - Marijuana Eradication
          - Digital Forensics Unit
          - Technical Operations Unit
          - Cold Case Unit
        - Criminal Intelligence Unit
      - Special Operations Unit
        - Special Response Teams
        - Aviation Section
        - K‐9 Unit
        - Explosive Response Teams
      - Crimes Against Children Unit
      - Executive Protection Unit

=== Troops and detachments ===
Troop 0 Command - South Charleston

- Headquarters
- Forensic Laboratory
- Executive Protection
- Special Operations

Troop 1 Command - Fairmont

- Bridgeport Detachment
- Fairmont Detachment
- Grafton Detachment
- Kingwood Detachment
- Morgantown Detachment
- Moundsville Detachment
- New Cumberland Detachment
- New Martinsville Detachment
- Wellsburg Detachment
- West Union Detachment
- Wheeling Detachment

Troop 2 Command - Charles Town

- Berkeley Springs Detachment
- Charles Town Detachment
- Keyser Detachment
- Martinsburg Detachment
- Moorefield Detachment
- Romney Detachment

Troop 3 Command - Elkins

- Buckhannon Detachment
- Elkins Detachment
- Franklin Detachment
- Glenville Detachment
- Marlinton Detachment
- Parsons Detachment
- Philippi Detachment
- Sutton Detachment
- Webster Springs Detachment
- Weston Detachment

Troop 4 Command - South Charleston

- Clay Detachment
- Grantsville Detachment
- Harrisville Detachment
- Parkersburg Detachment
- Quincy Detachment
- Ripley Detachment
- South Charleston Detachment
- Spencer Detachment
- Mason County Detachment
- Winfield Detachment
- St Marys Detachment

Troop 5 Command - Logan

- Hamlin Detachment
- Huntington Detachment
- Logan Detachment
- Madison Detachment
- Williamson Detachment
- Wayne Detachment

Troop 6 Command - Beckley

- Beckley Detachment
- Gauley Bridge Detachment
- Hinton Detachment
- Jesse Detachment
- Lewisburg Detachment
- Oak Hill Detachment
- Princeton Detachment
- Rainelle Detachment
- Richwood Detachment
- Summersville Detachment
- Welch Detachment
- Whitesville Detachment
- Union Detachment

Troop 7 Parkways (WV Turnpike) Command - Beckley

- Parkways - Beckley Parkways Detachment
- Parkways - Charleston South Parkways Detachment
- Parkways - Princeton Parkways Detachment

Troop 8 Bureau of Criminal Investigation (BCI)

== Fallen officers ==
Since the establishment of the West Virginia State Police, 42 officers have died while on duty.

== See also ==
- Highway Patrol
- List of law enforcement agencies in West Virginia
- West Virginia State Police Academy
- State Police (United States)
- State Patrol

== Additional references ==
- State Journal (in a May 2005 article)
- State Trooper: America's State Troopers and Highway Patrolmen (Turner Publishing Company)
