= West Columbia, West Virginia =

- Unincorporated community
- Location within West Virginia Location within the United States
- Coordinates: 38°58′59″N 82°03′49″W
- Country: United States
- State: West Virginia
- County: Mason
- Elevation: 571 ft (174 m)
- Time zone: UTC-5 (Eastern (EST))
  - Summer (DST): UTC-4 (EDT)
- ZIP code: 25287
- Area codes: 304 & 681
- GNIS feature ID: 1555941

West Columbia is an unincorporated community in Mason County, West Virginia, United States. West Columbia is located on the Ohio River and West Virginia Route 62, 3 miles (4.8 km) southwest of Mason. West Columbia has a post office with ZIP code 25287.

The community most likely was named after Columbia, the female personification of the United States of America.

== Infrastructure ==
The West Virginia Division of Corrections and Rehabilitation operates the women's prison Lakin Correctional Center in Lakin, near West Columbia.

== Notable person ==
- Georgiana Goddard King (1871–1939), Hispanist and medievalist
