= Lakin State Hospital =

- State Hospital for the Colored Insane
- Former names: Lakin State Hospital for the Colored Insane

General information
- Status: Repurposed; Partially Demolished
- Type: Institutional
- Location: Lakin, West Virginia, United States
- Construction started: 1919
- Opened: 1926
- Closed: 1979
- Owner: State of West Virginia

Technical details
- Material: Foundation-Stone, Exterior-Brick, Roof-Slate

Design and construction
- Known for: The only state hospital with an all black staff, including the superintendent

Lakin State Hospital for the Colored Insane — later called simply Lakin State Hospital — was a publicly-funded psychiatric hospital located along West Virginia Route 62 in Lakin, Mason County, West Virginia, near Point Pleasant. It operated for 53 years from 1926 until 1979.

During segregation and Jim Crow, the asylum was designated by the State of West Virginia to care for the "colored insane". It would become one of only two known psychiatric institutions that was entirely run by people of color serving an all black population.

According to a former attendant, the institution was so underfunded it could not afford to give every patient a sheet. The institution was a "favorite stop" of Walter Jackson Freeman II during his so-called West Virginia Lobotomy Project, with Freeman pitching the discredited procedure as a way to send patients home and save money for the state.

Governor of West Virginia Patrick Morrisey stated he planned to sell Lakin and the state's other three long-term care hospitals to Marx Development Group for $60 million in 2025, which intends to construct new facilities.

== See also ==
- Trans-Allegheny Lunatic Asylum (Weston State Hospital), West Virginia's facility for white mental inmates
