= Mount Olive, Fayette County, West Virginia =

Mount Olive, West Virginia
- Unincorporated community
- Location within West Virginia Location within the United States
- Coordinates: 38°14′16″N 81°14′00″W
- Country: United States
- State: West Virginia
- County: Fayette
- Elevation: 1,594 ft (486 m)
- Time zone: UTC-5 (Eastern (EST))
  - Summer (DST): UTC-4 (EDT)
- ZIP code: 25185
- Area codes: 304 & 681
- GNIS feature ID: 1555174

Mount Olive is an unincorporated community in Fayette County, West Virginia, United States. Mount Olive is 5.5 miles (8.9 km) north-northwest of Gauley Bridge. The town itself has no ZIP code; however, Mount Olive Correctional Complex, West Virginia's maximum-security state prison, is located near the town and has a post office with ZIP code 25185.
