= Smithers, West Virginia =

City in West Virginia, US

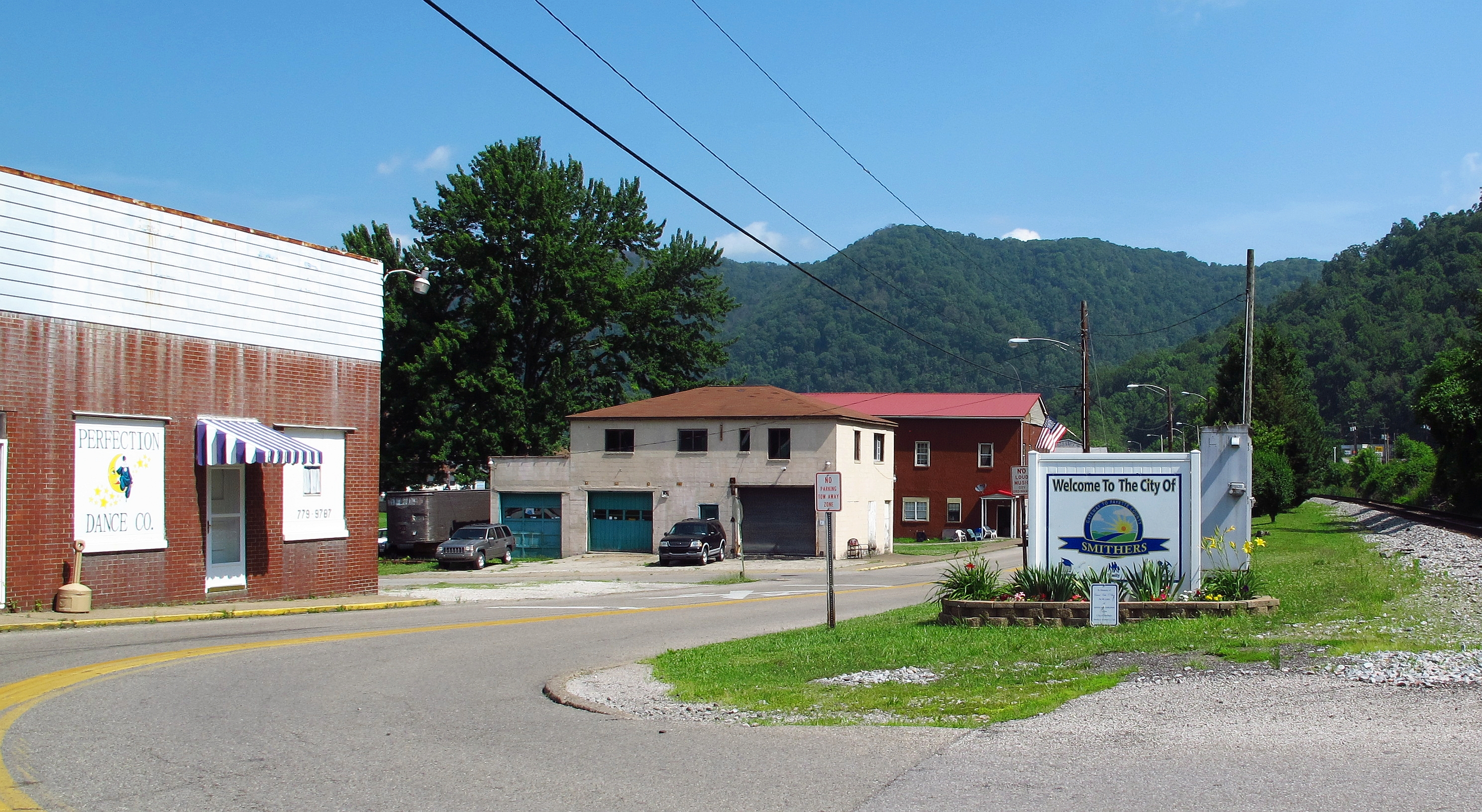
- Michigan Avenue in Smithers

- Location of Smithers in Fayette County, West Virginia.
- Coordinates: 38°10′39″N 81°18′23″W
- Country: United States
- State: West Virginia
- Counties: Fayette, Kanawha
- Incorporated: 1938

Area
  - Total: 1.64 sq mi (4.26 km^{2})
  - Land: 1.45 sq mi (3.75 km^{2})
  - Water: 0.20 sq mi (0.51 km^{2})
- Elevation: 633 ft (193 m)

Population (2020)
  - Total: 754
  - Estimate (2021): 737
  - Density: 506.9/sq mi (195.71/km^{2})
- Time zone: UTC-5 (Eastern (EST))
  - Summer (DST): UTC-4 (EDT)
- ZIP code: 25186
- Area code: 304
- FIPS code: 54-74740
- GNIS feature ID: 1547007
- Website: local.wv.gov/smithers/Pages/default.aspx

Smithers is a city in Fayette and Kanawha counties in the U.S. state of West Virginia. Located along the Kanawha River, it lies almost entirely in Fayette County. The population was 751 at the 2020 census. The city most likely takes its name from Smithers Creek.

== History ==
Smithers was incorporated in 1938. The city was named for James Smithers, an early settler who resided at the mouth of Smithers Creek.

== Geography ==
Smithers is located at 38°10′39″N 81°18′23″W (38.177389, -81.306269), along the Kanawha River at the mouth of Smithers Creek.

According to the United States Census Bureau, the city has a total area of 0.50 square miles (1.29 km^{2}), all land.

== Demographics ==
Historical population
Census	Pop.	Note	%±
1940	2,232		—
1950	2,208		−1.1%
1960	1,696		−23.2%
1970	2,020		19.1%
1980	1,482		−26.6%
1990	1,162		−21.6%
2000	904		−22.2%
2010	813		−10.1%
2020	754		−7.3%
2021 (est.)	737		−2.3%
U.S. Decennial Census

=== 2020 census ===
As of the 2020 census, Smithers had a population of 754. The median age was 44.8 years, with 19.8% of residents under the age of 18 and 25.1% 65 years of age or older. For every 100 females there were 89.4 males, and for every 100 females age 18 and over there were 77.9 males age 18 and over.

0.0% of residents lived in urban areas, while 100.0% lived in rural areas.

There were 352 households in Smithers, of which 25.3% had children under the age of 18 living in them. Of all households, 27.6% were married-couple households, 21.9% were households with a male householder and no spouse or partner present, and 40.6% were households with a female householder and no spouse or partner present. About 38.9% of all households were made up of individuals and 17.9% had someone living alone who was 65 years of age or older.

There were 429 housing units, of which 17.9% were vacant. The homeowner vacancy rate was 3.3% and the rental vacancy rate was 9.9%.

Racial composition as of the 2020 census
Race	Number	Percent
White	663	87.9%
Black or African American	34	4.5%
American Indian and Alaska Native	1	0.1%
Asian	0	0.0%
Native Hawaiian and Other Pacific Islander	0	0.0%
Some other race	2	0.3%
Two or more races	54	7.2%
Hispanic or Latino (of any race)	12	1.6%

=== 2010 census ===
As of the census of 2010, there were 813 people, 405 households, and 216 families living in the city. The population density was 1,626.0 inhabitants per square mile (627.8/km^{2}). There were 473 housing units at an average density of 946.0 units per square mile (365.3 units/km^{2}). The racial makeup of the city was 89.8% White, 8.0% African American, 0.6% Native American, and 1.6% from two or more races. Hispanic or Latino of any race were 0.7% of the population.

There were 405 households, of which 20.0% had children under the age of 18 living with them, 31.1% were married couples living together, 16.5% had a female householder with no husband present, 5.7% had a male householder with no wife present, and 46.7% were non-families. 41.0% of all households were made up of individuals, and 20.8% had someone living alone who was 65 years of age or older. The average household size was 2.01 and the average family size was 2.67.

The median age in the city was 49.8 years. 17.1% of residents were under the age of 18; 9.2% were between the ages of 18 and 24; 19% were from 25 to 44; 29.1% were from 45 to 64; and 25.7% were 65 years of age or older. The gender makeup of the city was 46.0% male and 54.0% female.

=== 2000 census ===
As of the census of 2000, there were 904 people, 450 households, and 259 families living in the city. The population density was 1,686.9 people per square mile (651.3 people/km^{2}). There were 553 housing units at an average density of 1,031.9 units per square mile (398.4 units/km^{2}). The racial makeup of the city was 90.15% White, 8.41% African American, 0.55% Native American, 0.11% Asian, 0.11% from other races, and 0.66% from two or more races. Hispanic or Latino of any race were 0.22% of the population.

There were 450 households, out of which 21.3% had children under the age of 18 living with them, 34.7% were married couples living together, 17.3% had a female householder with no husband present, and 42.4% were non-families. 38.2% of all households were made up of individuals, and 16.7% had someone living alone who was 65 years of age or older. The average household size was 2.01 and the average family size was 2.63.

The age distribution is 19.8% under the age of 18, 12.6% from 18 to 24, 23.5% from 25 to 44, 22.6% from 45 to 64, and 21.6% who were 65 years of age or older. The median age was 40 years. For every 100 females, there were 90.7 males. For every 100 females age 18 and over, there were 83.1 males.

The median income for a household in the city was $20,417, and the median income for a family was $27,734. Males had a median income of $22,353 versus $18,846 for females. The per capita income for the city was $12,807. About 20.0% of families and 22.8% of the population were below the poverty line, including 33.7% of those under age 18 and 8.6% of those age 65 or over.

== Education ==
Smithers had a combined middle school and high school, Valley High School, serving grades 6–12. The school closed at the end of the 2018–19 school year. The campus is now used as Valley PK-8.

== Notable people ==
- Bertis Downs IV – legal and managerial representative of the musical group R.E.M.
- Gino Marchetti – former NFL defensive end, member of the Pro Football Hall of Fame
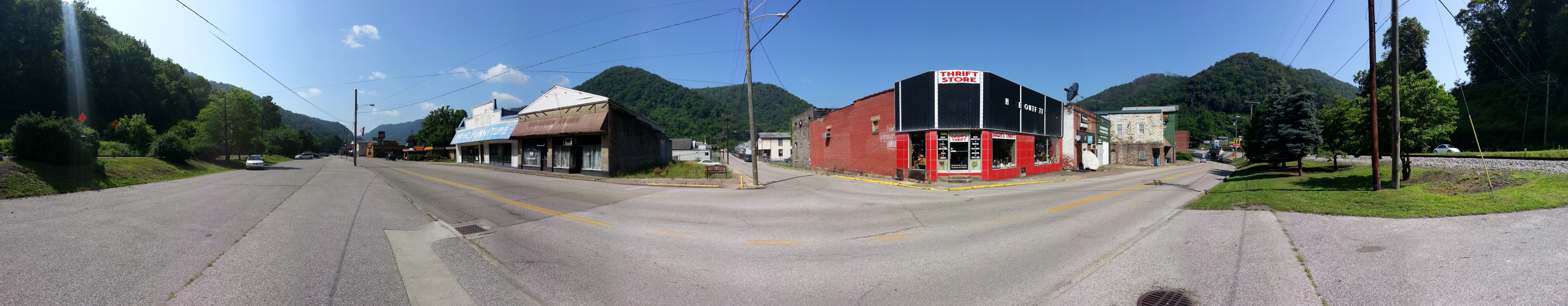
Michigan Avenue in Smithers
