= West Virginia Department of Administration =

American government agency

Agency overview
- Jurisdiction: State of West Virginia
- Agency executive: John McHugh, West Virginia Secretary of Administration
- Website: www.administration.wv.gov

The West Virginia Department of Administration is a government agency of the U.S. state of West Virginia. The Department of Administration is responsible for overseeing a variety of programs and services relating to personnel, purchasing, technology, facility management, health and liability insurance, and real estate.

The current Secretary of the West Virginia Department of Administration is Allan McVey, assumed office on January 23, 2019

== Agencies ==
- The Division of Aviation enhances the efficiency and effectiveness of state government by providing safe and professional aviation support by reducing travel time and increasing productivity for the state executives. Currently the Director of the Division of Aviation is Chip McDowell.
- The Division of Personnel was created to provide leadership in human resource management for the executive operating agencies of state government.
- The Division of Finance provides the financial management of the state's resources.
- The Division of Fleet Management oversees all aspects of the fleet operation for the state of West Virginia, which consists of more than 7,000 state-owned passenger vehicles and aircraft.
- The Division of General Services is composed of several units, whose functions include providing operations and maintenance, custodial services and grounds maintenance.
- The Purchasing Division was created to establish centralized offices to provide purchasing and travel services to the various state agencies.
- The Division of Real Estate acts upon behalf of the Secretary of Administration to select and acquire by contract of leases all grounds, buildings, and office space.
- The Board of Risk and Insurance Management provides casualty insurance coverage for all state agencies.
- The Consolidated Public Retirement Board is responsible for the administration of all State retirement plans for educational employees, public employees, deputy sheriffs, judges, and public safety personnel.
- The Equal Employment Opportunity Office was established to prevent and eliminate unlawful employment discrimination and to promote diversity in West Virginia state government.
- The Ethics Commission implements and enforces a code of ethical conduct enacted by the Legislature for public servants.
- The Public Employees Grievance Board provides the employees and employers of the state a procedure for resolving problems arising in employment within agencies.
- The Prosecuting Attorneys Institute provides training, service, support and resources to prosecutors, staff and law enforcement.
- The Public Defender Service funds all indigent defense for the state.
