= Prince Charles Elementary School =

Prince Charles Elementary School may refer to:

- Prince Charles Elementary School (Abbotsford), School District 34 Abbotsford, British Columbia, Canada
- Prince Charles Elementary School (Saint John), a school in New Brunswick, Canada
- Prince Charles Elementary School (Surrey), British Columbia, Canada
- Prince Charles Elementary School (Belleville), Belleville, Ontario, Canada
