= Commissioner of Baseball =

Chief executive of Major League Baseball

Commissioner of Major League Baseball
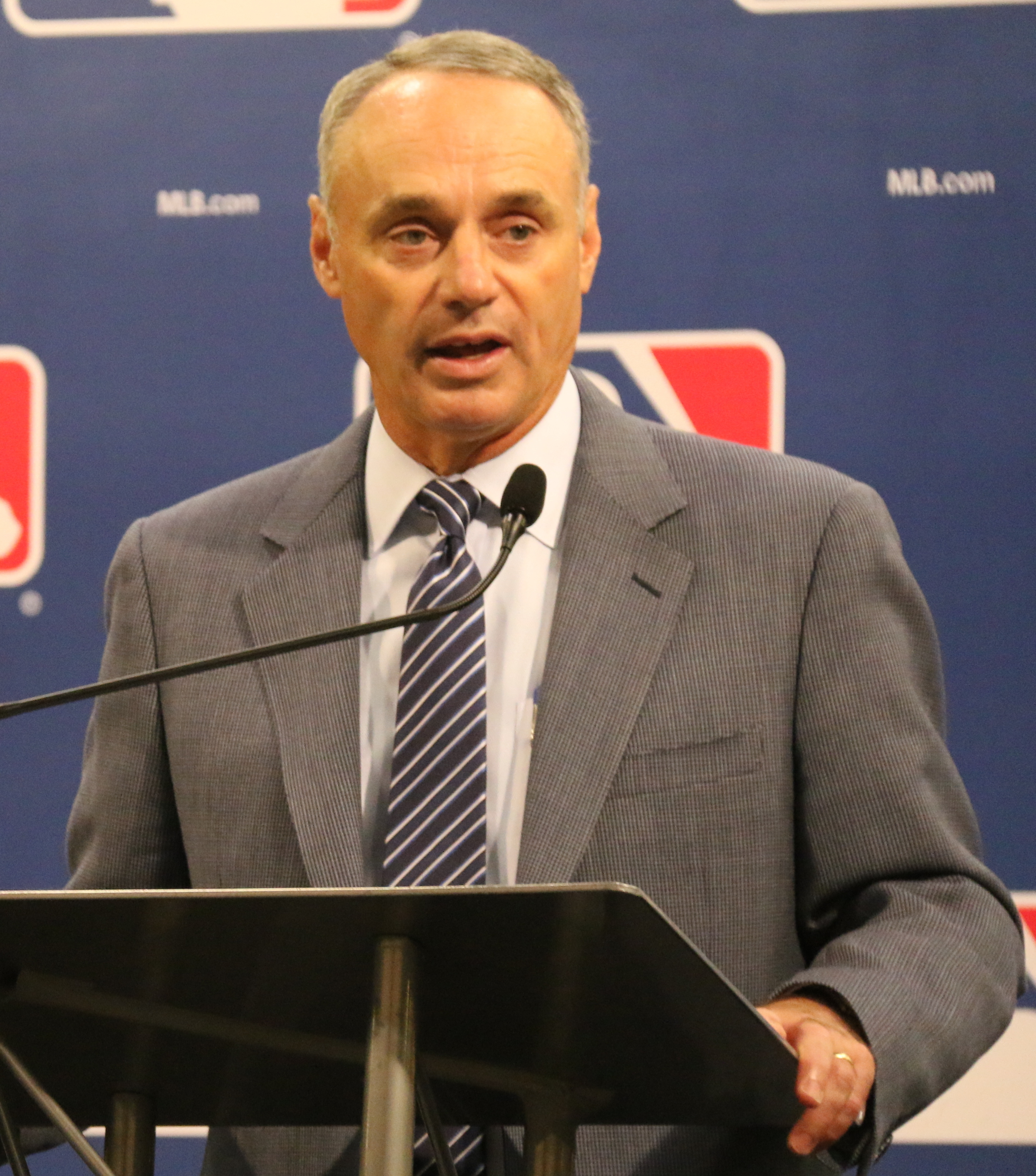
- Incumbent; Rob Manfred since January 25, 2015
- Precursor: National Baseball Commission
- Inaugural holder: Kenesaw Mountain Landis
- Formation: 1920
- Website: Official website

The commissioner of baseball is the chief executive officer of Major League Baseball (MLB) and the associated Minor League Baseball (MiLB) – a constellation of leagues and clubs known as "affiliated baseball". Under the direction of the commissioner, the Office of the Commissioner of Baseball hires and maintains the sport's umpiring crews, and negotiates marketing, labor, and television contracts. The commissioner is chosen by a vote of the owners of the teams. The incumbent MLB commissioner is Rob Manfred, who assumed office on January 25, 2015.

== Origin of the office ==
The title "commissioner", which is a title that is now applied to the heads of several other major sports leagues as well as baseball, derives from its predecessor office, the National Baseball Commission, the ruling body of professional baseball starting with the National Agreement of 1903, which created unity between both the National League and the American League. The agreement consisted of three members: the two league presidents and a commission chairman, whose primary responsibilities were to preside at meetings and to mediate disputes. Although Cincinnati Reds president August Herrmann served as commission chairman and as such was the nominal head of major league baseball, it was the American League president Ban Johnson who dominated the commission.

The event that would eventually lead to the appointment of a single commissioner of baseball was the Black Sox Scandal – perhaps the worst of a series of incidents in the late 1910s that jeopardized the integrity of the game of baseball. However, the desire to rebuild public relations was not the only motivation behind the creation of the commissioner's office. The scandal had not only tarnished the image of baseball, but it had brought relations between team owners and American League president Johnson to a boiling point. In particular, Chicago White Sox owner Charles Comiskey was piqued and incensed at what he perceived to be the indifference of the commission members (especially Johnson) to his suspicions that the 1919 World Series had been thrown to Herrmann's Reds. Meanwhile, the commission came under pressure to remove Herrmann from his post due to anti-German sentiment following U.S. entry into World War I.

At the end of the 1920 season, the National League, whose owners had never been on good terms with Johnson, agreed to invite the White Sox along with the Boston Red Sox and New York Yankees to join their league. The National League also unveiled plans to put a twelfth team in Cleveland or Detroit. With the American League's status as a major league (and possibly its very existence) suddenly in jeopardy, the five American League owners loyal to Johnson sued for peace. Eventually, at the urging of Detroit Tigers owner and Johnson loyalist Frank Navin, a compromise was reached in late 1920 to reform the National Commission with a membership of non-baseball men.

== Overview of commissioners ==
=== Kenesaw Mountain Landis (1920–1944) ===
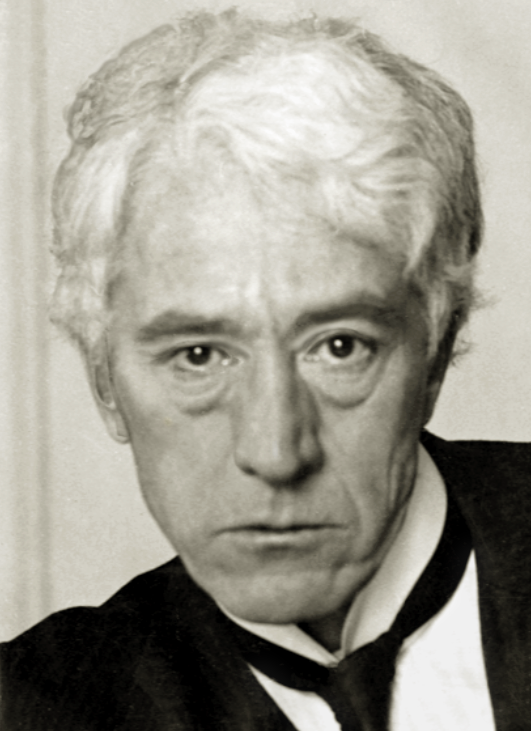
Kenesaw Mountain Landis

Having agreed to appoint only non-baseball men to the National Commission, the owners tapped federal judge Kenesaw Mountain Landis, an ardent baseball fan, to serve as the reformed commission's chairman. Landis responded by declaring that he would only accept an appointment as sole commissioner, with nearly unlimited authority to act in the "best interests of baseball" – in essence, serving as an arbitrator whose decisions could not be appealed. Finally, Landis insisted on a lifetime contract. The owners, still reeling from the perception that the sport was crooked, readily agreed.

==== Gambling ====
Landis's first significant act was to deal with the Black Sox scandal. Following a trial, the eight players suspected of involvement in the fix were acquitted. Nevertheless, immediately following the players' acquittal, Landis banned them all from baseball for life. He famously declared, "Regardless of the verdict of juries, no player who throws a ballgame, no player that undertakes or promises to throw a ballgame, no player that sits in conference with a bunch of crooked players and gamblers where the ways and means of throwing a game are discussed and does not promptly tell his club about it, will ever play professional baseball." Landis explained that even though the players had all been acquitted in court, there was no dispute that they had broken the rules of baseball. Therefore, he maintained that none of them could be allowed back in the game if its image was to be restored with the public. Among those banned were Buck Weaver and superstar Shoeless Joe Jackson, who have generally been viewed to be far less culpable compared to the other six accused. Landis's position was that he had no doubt that Weaver and Jackson at the very least knew about the fix, and failed to report it, and that this alone was grounds for permanent banishment.

Over the years, he dealt harshly with others proven to have thrown individual games, consorted with gamblers, or engaged in actions that he felt tarnished the image of the game. Among the others he banned were New York Giants players Phil Douglas and Jimmy O'Connell, Philadelphia Phillies pitcher Gene Paulette, Giants coach Cozy Dolan, and (in 1943) Phillies owner William D. Cox. He also formalized the unofficial banishments of Hal Chase and Heinie Zimmerman. In 1921, he banned Giants center fielder Benny Kauff even though he had been acquitted of involvement in a car theft ring. Nonetheless, Landis was convinced Kauff was guilty and argued that players of "undesirable reputation and character" had no place in baseball.

==== An independent commissioner's office ====
The owners had initially assumed that Landis would deal with the Black Sox Scandal and then settle into a comfortable retirement as the titular head of baseball. Instead, Landis ruled baseball with an iron hand for the next 25 years. He established a fiercely independent commissioner's office that would go on to often make both players and owners miserable with decisions that he argued were in the best interests of the game. He worked to clean up the hooliganism that was tarnishing the reputation of players in the 1920s. Without a union to represent them, the players had no meaningful recourse to challenge Landis's virtually unchecked authority. On the other hand, Landis inserted his office into negotiations with players, where he deemed appropriate, to put an end to a few of the more egregious labor practices that had contributed to the players' discontent. He also personally approved broadcasters for the World Series.

Landis's only significant rival in the early years was longtime American League founder and president Ban Johnson, who had been reckoned as the most powerful man in the game before Landis's arrival. Johnson was as strong-willed as Landis, and a clash between the two was inevitable. It happened in the 1924 World Series. When several Giants were implicated in a plan to bribe players on the moribund Phillies late in the season, Johnson demanded that the Series be canceled, and loudly criticized Landis's handling of the affair, to which Landis responded by threatening to resign. The American League owners promised to throw Johnson out of office if he stepped out of line again. Two years later, when Johnson criticized Landis's decision to give Ty Cobb and Tris Speaker an amnesty after it surfaced they had bet on a fixed game in 1919, Landis told the American League owners to choose between him and Johnson. The owners promptly sent Johnson on a sabbatical from which he never really returned.

==== The baseball color line ====
Landis perpetuated the color line and prolonged the segregation of organized baseball. His successor, Happy Chandler, said, "For twenty-four years Judge Landis wouldn't let a black man play. I had his records, and I read them, and for twenty-four years Landis consistently blocked any attempts to put blacks and whites together on a big league field." Bill Veeck claimed Landis prevented him from purchasing the Phillies when Landis learned of Veeck's plan to integrate the team. The signing of the first black ballplayer in the modern era, Jackie Robinson, came less than a year after Landis's death on Chandler's watch and was engineered by one of Landis's old nemeses, Branch Rickey. Eleven weeks after Robinson's debut with the Brooklyn Dodgers, Veeck became the first American League owner to break the color line.

==== Curbing the growth of minor league farm systems ====
Landis tried to curb the growth of minor league farm systems by innovators such as Rickey, in the name of protecting the lower levels of professional ball. Landis argued that because a parent club could unilaterally call up players from teams that were involved in pennant races, the organization was unfairly interfering with the minor competitions. His position was that the championship of each minor league was of no less importance than the championships of the major leagues and that minor league fans and supporters had the right to see their teams competing as best they could. On the other hand, the decisive factor resulting in the eventual entrenchment of the modern farm system was not Landis's demise but rather the growing presence of MLB on television, which caused attendances in the minor leagues to collapse and left these clubs in a precarious financial position that would have made Landis's position untenable in any case.

Moreover, Landis prevented the formation of a powerful third major league when he stopped Pants Rowland from upgrading the Pacific Coast League in the 1940s. Furthermore, (and despite the fact that, insofar as he was accountable at all, it was strictly to major league owners) Landis did not hesitate to aggressively use the powers of his office to force the minor leagues and their clubs to submit to his authority in a number of ways. Most notably, he uncompromisingly held to a policy that dictated any minor league player who knowingly played with or against a player banned by Major League Baseball would himself be banned from MLB for life. This threat effectively compelled every minor league to rigidly honor and enforce suspensions handed down by Landis in their competitions as well. Nevertheless, some players banned by Landis are believed to have continued playing under assumed identities at the minor league or semi-professional level.

One of the schemes Landis vigorously fought was the effort by major-league teams to "cover up" players they were hiding in their farm systems. The term, not used in formal communications by the league or team officials, referred to players clandestinely signed by a major-league team to a minor-league contract. Occasionally one team would serendipitously find such a player in the off-season draft, as in this occasion recorded in the book Dodger Daze and Knights:

All the clubowners and managers, and Commissioner Landis, were assembled to conduct the draft. One team representative said he "claim[s] Player [Paul] Richards of Brooklyn".

"You can't do that!" barked a surprised Wilbert Robinson, manager of the Brooklyn Dodgers.

"Why not?" asked Landis.

"Because Brooklyn has him covered up", sputtered Robbie.

Most of the others broke down laughing. Even Landis smirked.

==== Death ====
Upon his death on November 25, 1944, 8 days after the owners voted him to another seven-year term (his contract was due to expire in January 1946), Landis's long-time assistant, Leslie O'Connor, replaced him on a temporary basis, as acting commissioner (technically, as chairman of the Major League Advisory Council) until the election of Happy Chandler as Landis's successor on April 24, 1945.

==== Legacy and honors ====
Whether his decisions were praised or criticized, he was satisfied with being respected and feared. Dubbed "the baseball tyrant" by journalists of the day, his rule was absolute. In the context of ensuring the integrity of the game itself, baseball historians generally regard him as the right man at the right time when appointed, but also as a man who perhaps held office too long.

He was elected to the Baseball Hall of Fame in 1944, in a special election held one month after his death, and the Most Valuable Player Award in each league was officially known as the Kenesaw Mountain Landis Award in his honor until 2020, following complaints from past MVP winners about Landis's role in stonewalling racial integration.

=== Happy Chandler (1945–1951) ===
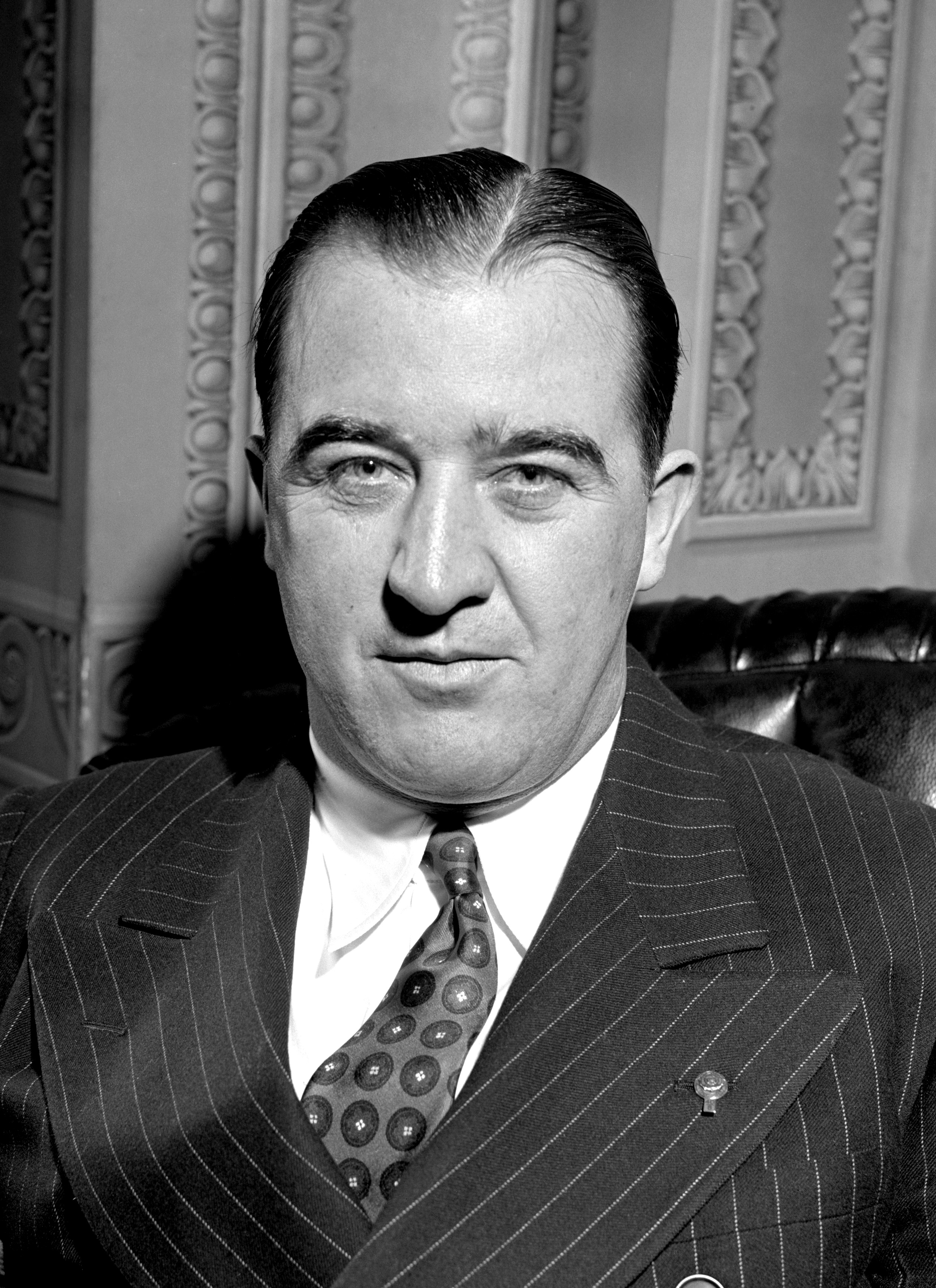
Happy Chandler

When Judge Landis died in 1944, an official in the War Department began campaigning for Senator Albert Benjamin "Happy" Chandler Sr.'s election to the post. Despite being the last candidate put forth in the April 1945 meetings, he was elected by a unanimous vote of the team owners, and resigned his Senate seat in October of that year.

Chandler clashed with Brooklyn Dodgers manager Leo "the Lip" Durocher over Durocher's association with gambling figures and his marriage to actress Laraine Day, which came amid allegations from Day's ex-husband that Durocher had stolen her away from him. Before the start of the 1947 season, Chandler suspended Durocher for the entire season, citing "conduct detrimental to baseball". The Dodgers went on to win the pennant that season under replacement manager Burt Shotton.

Chandler became known as "the players' commissioner" for his work on their behalf. During his service, he presided over the establishment of a pension fund for players and oversaw the initial steps toward integration of the major leagues, beginning with the debut of Jackie Robinson with the Brooklyn Dodgers in 1947. This move was controversial with team owners, who voted 15–1 against integrating the sport in a secret January 1947 meeting. The Dodgers' Branch Rickey met with Chandler, who agreed to back the team's move. Chandler's stance was credited by many in the sports community with Chandler's failure to be selected for another term as commissioner after the expiration of his first one in 1951.

Chandler was fully aware that he was jeopardizing his own commissionership by stewarding the integration process. Chandler's attitude was a simple one, which he conveyed to Branch Rickey, and later recounted in his autobiography:

I've already done a lot of thinking about this whole racial situation in our country. As a member of the Senate Military Affairs Committee, I got to know a lot about our casualties during the war. Plenty of Negro boys were willing to go out and fight and die for this country. Is it right when they came back to tell them they can't play the national pastime? You know, Branch, I'm going to have to meet my Maker some day. And if He asks me why I didn't let this boy play, and I say it's because he's black, that might not be a satisfactory answer. If the Lord made some people black, and some white, and some red or yellow, he must have had a pretty good reason. It isn't my job to decide which colors can play big league baseball. It is my job to see that the game is fairly played and that everybody has an equal chance. I think if I do that, I can face my Maker with a clear conscience.

=== Ford Frick (1951–1965) ===
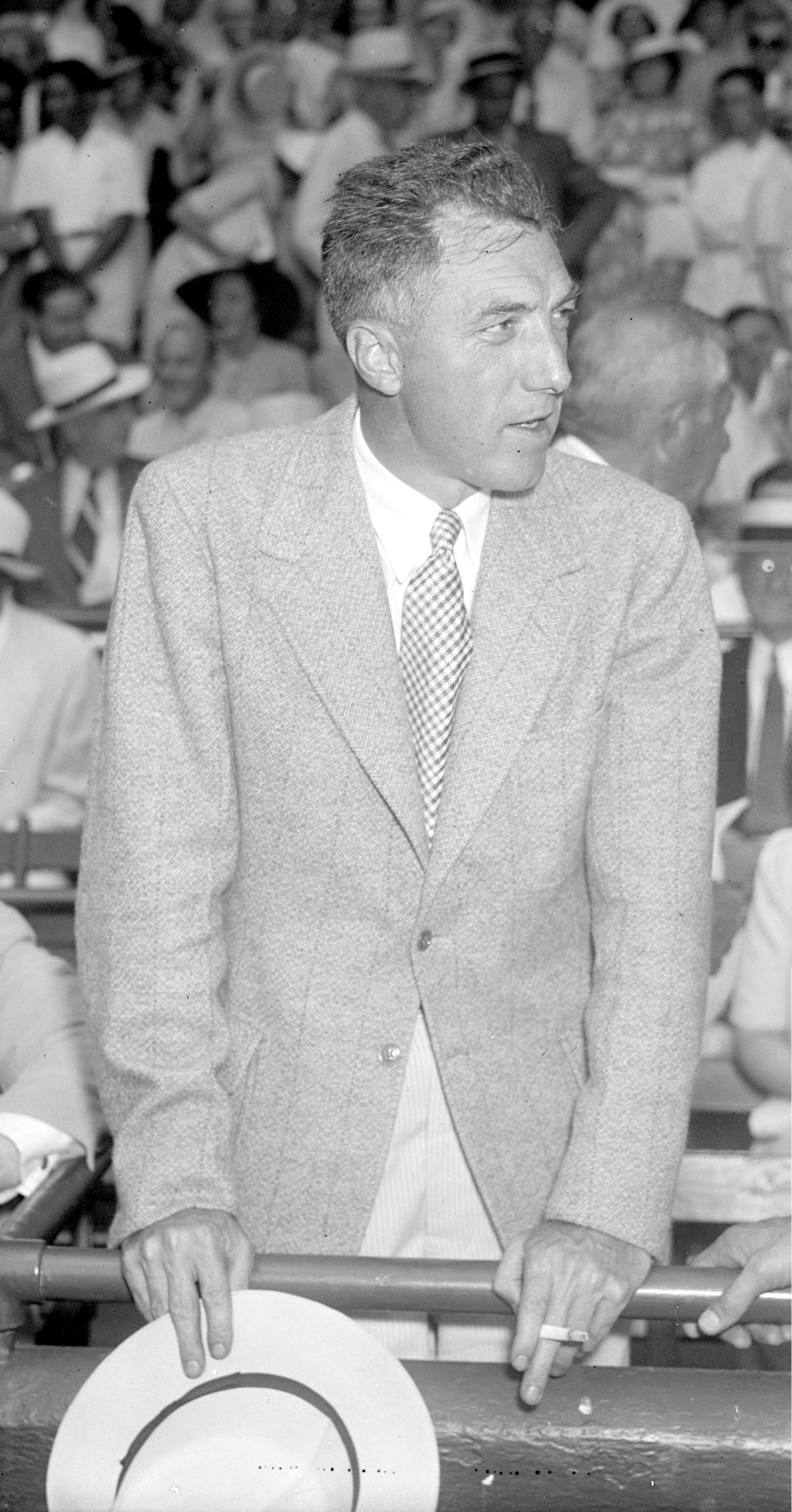
Ford Frick

In 1951, National League president Ford Frick succeeded Happy Chandler as commissioner of baseball. Frick's critics accused him of favoring the National League in his rulings, such as how the 1960s expansion teams would be stocked.

Frick's most well-known statement as commissioner was made in 1961 when several players were on a pace to break Babe Ruth's single-season home run record. In a press conference, Frick stated that the single-season home run record should be separated into multiple lists, based on the length of a season. (Frick has at times been credited with the saying that there should be an asterisk to differentiate between the two records, but this was actually first suggested by New York Daily News writer Dick Young). However, as MLB did not publish an official record book at the time, Frick had no control over how publishers presented MLB records, and within a few years after Roger Maris broke Ruth's record, all record books gave Maris sole credit as the single-season home run record holder.

Later, it was revealed that Frick had served as a ghostwriter for Ruth earlier in his career.

Although Frick did not initially express strong opposition to the establishment of the Continental League, a proposed third major league, he quietly encouraged the established Major League owners to offer franchises to several markets in which the proposed league planned to play through expansion and relocation. In doing so, he successfully caused the Continental League to fold without ever playing a game.

=== William Eckert (1965–1968) ===
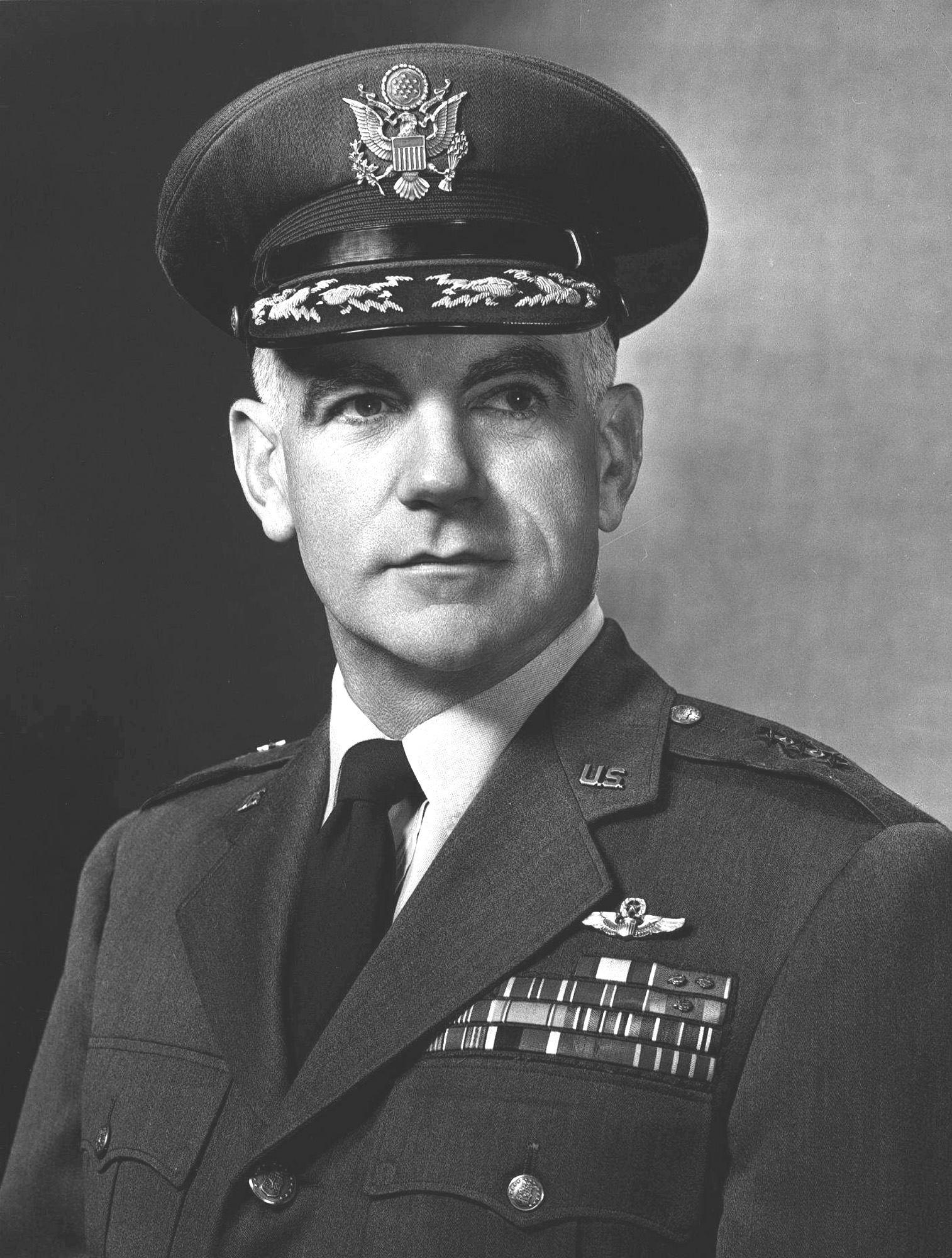
William Eckert

More than 150 names appeared on the original list of nominees for the commissionership following Ford Frick's retirement. The club owners initially were unable to decide if the next commissioner should come from within the ranks of the game as Frick had, or from elsewhere like Frick's two predecessors had. They finally decided that the new commissioner should have a strong business background to deal with the problems that were confronting the game at the time.

Retired US Army LTG William Eckert became a serious candidate for the commissionership only after fellow general officer Curtis LeMay gave Major League Baseball a recommendation for him. On November 17, 1965, by a unanimous vote of the then-20 major league club owners, William Eckert became the fourth commissioner of Major League Baseball.

When he became commissioner, Eckert had not seen a game in person in over 10 years. He was a compromise choice for the job, previously being so obscure that sportswriters nicknamed him "the Unknown Soldier".

During the 1968 season, Eckert incurred the public's ire by refusing to cancel exhibition games after the April assassination of Martin Luther King nor regular-season games after the June assassination of Robert F. Kennedy, while also incurring team owners' disdain because he refused to deal forcefully with substantive business issues. Anticipating a players' strike and having no ownership confidence in his ability to handle the situation, Eckert was forced to resign at the end of the 1968 season, although he still had three years on his contract.

In spite of his much-publicized failures and shortcomings, William Eckert also developed more effective committee actions, streamlined business methods, and helped stabilize franchises with bigger stadiums and long-term leases. In addition, Eckert worked hard toward promoting the game internationally, including a 1966 post-World Series tour of Japan by the National League champion Los Angeles Dodgers.

=== Bowie Kuhn (1969–1984) ===
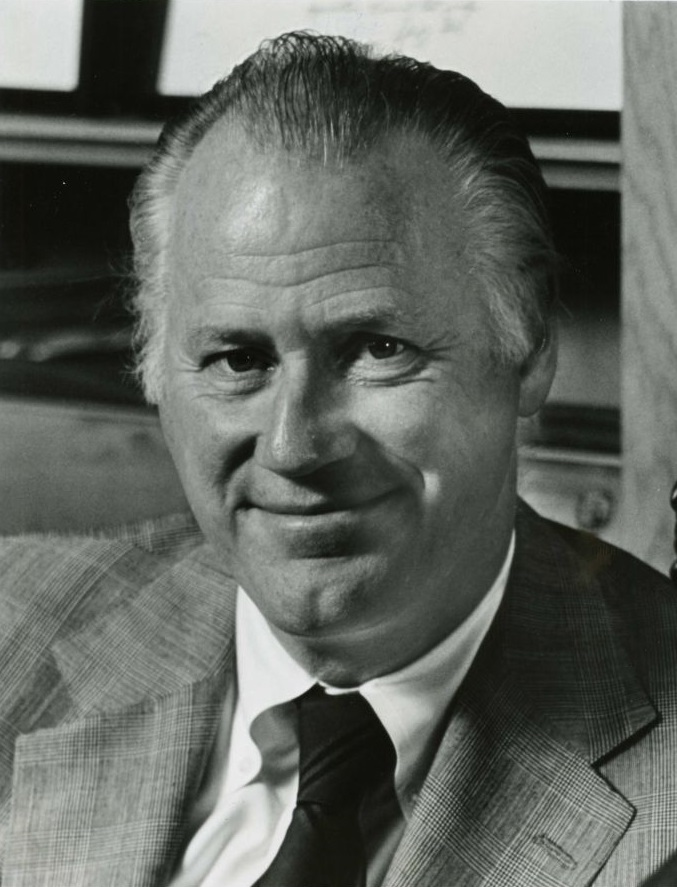
Bowie Kuhn

Bowie Kuhn's tenure was marked by labor strikes (most notably in 1981), owner disenchantment, and the end of baseball's reserve clause, yet baseball enjoyed unprecedented attendance gains (from 23 million in 1968 to 45.5 million in 1983) and television contracts during the same time frame.

Kuhn suspended numerous players for involvement with drugs and gambling, and took a strong stance against any activity that he perceived to be "not in the best interests of baseball".

In 1970, he suspended star Detroit Tigers pitcher Denny McLain indefinitely (the suspension was later set at 3 months) due to McLain's involvement in a bookmaking operation, and later suspended McLain for the rest of the season for carrying a gun. Among his more controversial decisions was to bar both Willie Mays (in 1979) and Mickey Mantle (in 1983) from the sport due to their involvement in casino promotion. Neither was directly involved in gambling, moreover the casinos they worked for did not even offer sports betting, let alone betting on baseball (this was not legalized in New Jersey until 2012). Mays and Mantle were reinstated by Kuhn's successor Peter Ueberroth in 1985.

Also in 1970, Kuhn described Jim Bouton's Ball Four as "detrimental to baseball" and demanded that Bouton retract it. The book has been republished several times and is now considered a classic.

On October 13, 1971, the World Series held a night game for the first time. Kuhn, who thought that baseball could attract a larger audience by featuring a prime time telecast (as opposed to a mid-afternoon broadcast, when most fans either worked or attended school), pitched the idea to NBC. An estimated 61 million people watched Game 4 on NBC; TV ratings for a World Series game during the daytime hours would not have approached such a record number. Kuhn's vision in this instance has been fulfilled, as all the World Series games since 1988 have been played in prime time.

==== Curt Flood ====
On October 7, 1969, the St. Louis Cardinals traded Curt Flood, catcher Tim McCarver, outfielder Byron Browne, and left-handed pitcher Joe Hoerner to the Philadelphia Phillies for first baseman Dick Allen, second baseman Cookie Rojas, and right-handed ace relief pitcher Jerry Johnson.

However, Flood refused to report to the moribund Phillies, citing the team's poor record and the fact that they played in dilapidated Connie Mack Stadium before belligerent and, Flood believed, racist fans. Flood forfeited a relatively lucrative US$100,000 (equivalent to $877,949 in 2025) contract by his refusal to be traded to the Phillies.

In a letter to Kuhn, Flood demanded that the commissioner declare him a free agent. Kuhn denied Flood's request to enter free agency, citing the propriety of the reserve clause, which was language in contracts that essentially prevented a player from playing with another team even after his contract expired. In response, Flood filed a lawsuit against Kuhn and Major League Baseball on January 16, 1970, alleging that Major League Baseball had violated federal antitrust laws. Even though Flood was making $90,000 (equivalent to $790,154 in 2025) at the time, he likened the reserve clause to slavery. It was certainly a controversial analogy, even among those who opposed the reserve clause.

The case, Flood v. Kuhn (407 U.S. 258) eventually went to the Supreme Court. Flood's attorney, former Supreme Court justice Arthur Goldberg, asserted that the reserve clause was depressing wages, and it limited players to one team for life. Major League Baseball's counsel countered that Commissioner Kuhn acted under the way he did "for the good of the game".

Ultimately, the Supreme Court, acting on stare decisis "to stand by things decided", ruled 5–3 in favor of Major League Baseball, upholding a 1922 ruling in the case of Federal Baseball Club v. National League (259 U.S. 200).

==== Charles O. Finley ====
Though he had a reputation as an owners' commissioner, Kuhn did not avoid confronting owners when he deemed it necessary. For example, he was a major adversary of Oakland Athletics owner Charles O. Finley. A major embarrassment for baseball resulted from Finley's actions during the 1973 World Series. Finley forced player Mike Andrews to sign a false affidavit saying he was injured after the reserve infielder committed two consecutive errors in the 12th inning of Oakland's Game 2 loss to the New York Mets. Andrews' teammates as well as manager Dick Williams rallied to his defense. Kuhn in return forced Finley to reinstate Andrews. In 1976, when Finley attempted to sell several players to the Boston Red Sox and New York Yankees for $3.5 million, Kuhn blocked the deals on the grounds that they would be bad for the game. Some believe that Kuhn's actions were simply a revenge tactic, aimed at Finley, after Finley attempted to force an owners vote to remove Kuhn as commissioner in 1975.

==== Kuhn's war on drugs ====
After being in office for over ten years, Kuhn had grown a strong reputation for being particularly hard on players who abused drugs. Kuhn was quick to punish players who used drugs with heavy fines and big suspensions. Kansas City Royals catcher Darrell Porter told the Associated Press that during the winter of 1979–1980 he became paranoid, convinced that Kuhn knew about his drug abuse, was trying to sneak into his house, and planned to ban him from baseball for life. Porter found himself sitting up at night in the dark watching out the front window, waiting for Kuhn to approach, clutching billiard balls, and a shotgun. Ironically, when Porter was named the most valuable player of the 1982 World Series while playing for the Cardinals, Kuhn was on hand to congratulate him.

In 1983, four players from the Kansas City Royals – Willie Wilson, Jerry Martin, Willie Mays Aikens, and Vida Blue – were found guilty of cocaine use. In addition, such established stars as Ferguson Jenkins, Keith Hernandez, Dave Parker, and Dale Berra admitted to having problems with drugs.

==== Willie Mays and Mickey Mantle ====
Hall of Famers Willie Mays and Mickey Mantle were banned in 1980 and 1983 respectively after they were hired by casinos in Atlantic City, New Jersey, as greeters and autograph signers. These bans were highly controversial at the time since both players were retired and both in no way involved in baseball at the time, and because neither player's duties were related in any way to sports betting, which was still illegal at the time in New Jersey in any case, let alone betting on baseball. Nevertheless, Kuhn stood firm and opined that a casino was "no place for a baseball hero and Hall of Famer." The bans took place prior to the Hall formalizing its policy against inducting banned persons, and the Hall took no action as a result of Kuhn's decision. Both players were reinstated by Kuhn's successor in 1985.

==== Lifetime baseball passes ====
In 1980, during the Iranian hostage crisis, Kuhn sat at a baseball game with Jeremiah Denton, a Navy admiral and former POW in Vietnam who would be elected U.S. senator later that year from the state of Alabama. Recalling the event to The Washington Post, Kuhn believed that "that afternoon ... the idea of a lifetime baseball pass was discussed", and upon their return from Iran, each of the 52 hostages was given one of these unique passes.

==== Leaving office ====
Kuhn was both praised and attacked for the firm stand that he levied against offenders. In 1982, some of the owners organized a move to push him out of office. In 1983, Kuhn and his supporters made a last-ditch effort to renew his contract, but they ultimately failed. Kuhn, though, was allowed to stay for the 1984 regular season before being replaced by Peter Ueberroth.

=== Peter Ueberroth (1984–1989) ===
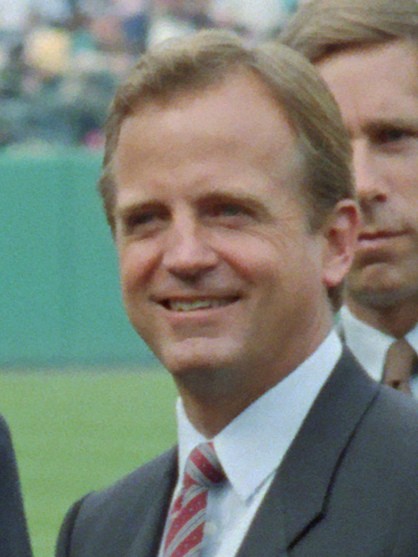
Peter Ueberroth

Peter Ueberroth was elected to succeed Bowie Kuhn on March 3, 1984, and took office on October 1 of that year. As a condition of his hiring, Ueberroth increased the commissioner's fining ability from US$5,000 to $250,000. His salary was raised to a reported $450,000, nearly twice what Kuhn was paid.

Just as Ueberroth was taking office the Major League Umpires Union was threatening to strike the postseason. Ueberroth managed to arbitrate the disagreement and had the umpires back to work before the League Championship Series were over. The next summer, Ueberroth worked behind the scenes to limit a players' strike to one day before a new labor agreement was worked out with the Players Association (MLBPA).

During the course of his stint as commissioner, Ueberroth reinstated Hall of Famers Willie Mays and Mickey Mantle, who had been banned from working for Major League Baseball by Kuhn because of their associations with gambling casinos. Also, Ueberroth suspended numerous players because of cocaine use, negotiated a $1.1 billion television contract with CBS, and initiated the investigation against Pete Rose's betting habits. In 1985, Ueberroth's first full year in office, the League Championship Series expanded from a best-of-five series to a best-of-seven series. At his urging, the Chicago Cubs chose to install lights at Wrigley Field rather than reimburse the leagues for lost night-game revenues. Ueberroth then found a new source of income in the form of persuading large corporations to pay for the privilege of having their products endorsed by Major League Baseball.

However, Ueberroth, with the assistance of the owners, also facilitated collusion, an illegal violation of the league's collective bargaining agreement with the players, during the 1985, 1986 and 1987 off-seasons. Players entering free-agency were prevented from both signing equitable contracts and joining the teams of their choice during this period, a strategy that union leader Marvin Miller later held was "tantamount to fixing, not just games, but entire pennant races, including all post-season series". The MLBPA filed collusion charges, arguing that Ueberroth and team owners had violated the collective bargaining agreement in the 1985, 1986, and 1987 seasons. The MLBPA won each case, resulting in "second look" free agents, and over $280 million in owner fines. Fay Vincent, who followed Ueberroth's successor in the commissioner's office, laid the crippling labor problems of the early 1990s directly at the feet of Ueberroth and the owners' collusion, holding that the collusion years constituted theft from the players. Under Ueberroth, Major League Baseball enjoyed increased attendance (record attendance four straight seasons), greater awareness of crowd control and alcohol management within ballparks, a successful and vigilant anti-drug campaign, significant industry-wide improvement in the area of fair employment, and a significantly improved financial picture for the industry through greater advertisement. When Ueberroth took office, 21 of the 26 clubs were losing money; in Ueberroth's last full season – 1988 – all clubs either broke even or finished in the black. In 1987, for example, baseball as an industry showed a net profit of $21.3 million, its first profitable year since 1973.

Nonetheless, following the announcement of the first of three large awards to the players following the collusion findings, Ueberroth stepped down as commissioner before the start of the 1989 regular season; his contract was to have run through the end of the season. He was succeeded by National League president A. Bartlett Giamatti.

=== A. Bartlett Giamatti (1989) ===
A Yale professor of English literature who became president of the university, A. Bartlett Giamatti had a lifelong interest in baseball (he was a die-hard Boston Red Sox fan). He became President of the National League in 1986. During his stint as National League president, Giamatti placed an emphasis on the need to improve the environment for the fans and players in the ballparks. He also decided to make umpires strictly enforce the balk rule that was previously loosely enforced, and supported "social justice" as the only remedy for the lack of presence of minority managers, coaches, or executives at any level in Major League Baseball.

While still serving as National League president, Giamatti suspended Cincinnati Reds manager Pete Rose for 30 games after Rose shoved umpire Dave Pallone on April 30, 1988. Later that year, Giamatti also suspended Los Angeles Dodgers pitcher Jay Howell, who was caught using pine tar during the National League Championship Series.

Giamatti, whose tough dealing with Yale's union favorably impressed Major League Baseball owners, was unanimously elected to succeed Peter Ueberroth as commissioner on September 8, 1988, and assumed office on April 1, 1989. Giamatti was commissioner on August 24, 1989 when Pete Rose voluntarily agreed to permanent ineligibility from baseball. As reflected in the agreement with Pete Rose, Giamatti was determined to maintain the integrity of the game during his brief commissionership.

On September 1, 1989, at his vacation home on Martha's Vineyard, Giamatti, a heavy smoker for many years, died suddenly of a heart attack at the age of 51. Giamatti died just eight days after banning Pete Rose and 154 days into his tenure as MLB commissioner. He became the second baseball commissioner to die in office, the first being Kenesaw Mountain Landis.

=== Fay Vincent (1989–1992) ===
Fay Vincent, who had assumed the position of deputy commissioner underneath and at the behest of his longtime friend Giamatti, became acting commissioner following Giamatti's death on September 1, 1989, and was quickly confirmed as the 8th commissioner of baseball. He presided over the 1989 World Series, which was interrupted by the Loma Prieta earthquake; the owners' lockout during Spring training of the 1990 season; and the expulsion of George Steinbrenner in his first year. Before accepting the job as Commissioner of Baseball, Vincent consulted with Bart Giamatti's widow, Toni, to make sure she thought it was appropriate for him to do so.

In 1990, National League president Bill White was prepared to suspend umpire Joe West for slamming Philadelphia pitcher Dennis Cook to the field, but Vincent intervened and no discipline was imposed upon West.

During his commissionership, Vincent made it known and very clear (e.g. while being interviewed by Pat O'Brien during CBS' coverage of Game 4 of the 1991 World Series) that if he had the chance, he would get rid of the designated hitter rule.

As deputy commissioner, Vincent was closely associated with Pete Rose's lifetime banishment from baseball for gambling; although the investigation that led to Rose's banishment began during Ueberroth's tenure and the banishment was levied by Giamatti, Vincent led the investigation and was directly involved in the negotiations. Vincent consistently stated that he did not support Rose's reinstatement.

==== 1989 World Series ====
On October 17, 1989, Vincent sat in a field box behind the left dugout at San Francisco's Candlestick Park. At 5:04 p.m., just prior to Game 3 of the World Series between the San Francisco Giants and Oakland Athletics, the 6.9 Mw Loma Prieta earthquake hit with a maximum Mercalli intensity of IX (Violent). At approximately 5:35 p.m., after coming to the conclusion that the power could not be restored before sunset, Vincent ordered the World Series game 3 to be postponed. According to Vincent, he had already made the decision to postpone Game 3 without telling anybody first. As a result, the umpires filed a formal protest against Vincent's decision. However, the game had to be postponed due to trouble with gas lines as well as the power issue resulting from the earthquake.

The World Series ultimately resumed after a ten-day postponement (and some initial conflict between Vincent and San Francisco mayor Art Agnos, who felt that the World Series ought to have been delayed much longer) on October 27, 1989. While presenting the Commissioner's Trophy to the Athletics, who wound up winning the World Series in a four-game sweep, Vincent controversially summed up the 1989 World Series as a "remarkable World Series in many respects".

==== 1990 lockout ====
In February 1990, owners announced that spring training would not be starting as scheduled. This occurred after MLBPA executive director Donald Fehr became afraid that the owners would institute a salary cap. Fehr believed that a salary cap could possibly restrict the number of choices that free agents could make and a pay-for-performance scale would eliminate multi-year contracts. The lockout, which was the seventh work stoppage in baseball since 1972, lasted 32 games and wiped out all of spring training.

Vincent worked with both the owners and the MLBPA and on March 19, 1990, Vincent was able to announce a new Basic Agreement (which raised the minimum major league salary from US$68,000 to $100,000 and established a six-man study committee on revenue sharing). As a consequence of the lockout, Opening Day for the 1990 season was moved back a week to April 9, and the season was extended by three days to accommodate for the normal 162-game schedule.

==== George Steinbrenner ====
On July 30, 1990, Vincent banned New York Yankees owner George Steinbrenner from baseball for life after Steinbrenner paid Howard Spira, a small-time gambler, $40,000 to dig up "dirt" on his outfielder Dave Winfield after Winfield had sued Steinbrenner for failing to pay his foundation the $300,000 guaranteed in his contract. Steinbrenner was eventually reinstated in 1993 (one year after Vincent left office).

==== Steve Howe ====
On June 24, 1992, Vincent permanently suspended pitcher Steve Howe for repeated drug offenses. Vincent was incensed when upper Yankee management (Buck Showalter, Gene Michael, and Jack Lawn) agreed to testify on Howe's behalf, and threatened them with expulsion from the game:

You have effectively resigned from baseball by agreeing to appear at that hearing.... you should have left your conscience and your principles outside the door.

The three men were unaffected by Vincent's hyperbole, testified for Howe as promised, and remained active in baseball. Three months later, Vincent was removed from his job as commissioner. Later, an arbitrator overturned Vincent's suspension of Howe on November 11, 1992.

==== 1993 expansion ====
In June 1991, Vincent declared that the American League would receive US$42 million of the National League's $190 million in expansion revenue and that the American League would provide players in the National League expansion draft (involving the Colorado Rockies and Florida Marlins, the latter now known as the Miami Marlins). In an attempt to win support in the American League and balance the vote, Vincent decreed that the American League owners were entitled to only 22 percent of the $190 million take. This decision marked the first time in MLB's expansion history that leagues were required to share expansion revenue or provide players for another league's expansion draft. Vincent said the owners expanded to raise money to pay their collusion debt.

==== Realignment ====
Just prior to leaving office, Vincent had plans to realign the National League. Vincent wanted the Chicago Cubs and St. Louis Cardinals to move from the Eastern Division to the Western Division. Part of the impetus for realignment was the geographically anomalous placement of the Cincinnati Reds and Atlanta Braves in the West and the Cubs and the Cardinals in the east since 1969. National League president Bill White warned Vincent that realigning without league approval would be a gross violation of the National League Constitution enacted in 1876.

Many thought this plan would be beneficial to the league as a whole, especially by building a regional rivalry between the new franchise in Miami and the Atlanta Braves. The Cubs, however, opposed the move, suggesting that fans in the Central Time Zone would be forced to watch more games originating on the West Coast with later broadcast times (had the realignment included the use of a balanced schedule, the Cubs would have actually played more games against teams outside their division).

On July 17, 1992, the Chicago Cubs sued Vincent and asked the U.S. District Court in Chicago for a preliminary injunction to prevent implementation, which was granted two weeks later. After Vincent's attorneys appealed, oral arguments were scheduled for August 30 that year. Ultimately, Vincent resigned before the litigation was scheduled to resume, so as a result, the Cubs dropped their suit against him.

Although Vincent's vision never really came into fruition, Major League Baseball did in fact realign in 1994, albeit in the form of three divisions in each league (east, central and west) and the addition of an expanded playoff format.

==== Vincent's relationship with the owners ====
His relationship with baseball's owners was always tenuous at best; he resigned in 1992 after the owners gave him an 18–9 no-confidence vote. The owners were still angry at Vincent over his intervention during the 1990 Spring Training lockout, which subsequently cancelled Spring Training that year and pushed the regular season back three days. The owners were also disappointed by dwindling television ratings in light of a US$1.1 billion, four-year deal with CBS (which ultimately cost the network $500 million) beginning in 1990 (Vincent's first full season as commissioner) and upwardly spiraling salaries. (It is also important to note that CBS itself contributed to decreasing ratings thanks to the haphazard scheduling of Game of the Week broadcasts during the regular season to the point that fans grew tired of tuning into no baseball on summer Saturdays.) They also accused him of acting in a high-handed manner, especially in the Howe affair.

The leaders in the movement to oust Vincent were members of what The Sporting News later dubbed "The Great Lakes Gang":

- Bud Selig, president of the Milwaukee Brewers;
- Jerry Reinsdorf, chairman of the Chicago White Sox;
- Stanton Cook, head of the Tribune Co., which owned the Chicago Cubs;
- Carl Pohlad, owner of the Minnesota Twins;
- Peter O'Malley, the longtime majority owner of the Los Angeles Dodgers

In his farewell, Vincent said

To do the job without angering an owner is impossible. I can't make all twenty-eight of my bosses happy. People have told me I'm the last commissioner. If so, it's a sad thing. I hope they [the owners] learn this lesson before too much damage is done.

He was replaced by Milwaukee Brewers owner Bud Selig, whose family continued to maintain ownership over the Brewers. Fay Vincent was never able to complete the five-year term that he had inherited from Bart Giamatti. Vincent would later contend that Major League Baseball made a huge mistake by not appointing his deputy commissioner Stephen Greenberg – the son of the Hall of Fame first baseman and left fielder Hank Greenberg – as the commissioner.

=== Bud Selig (1992–2015) ===
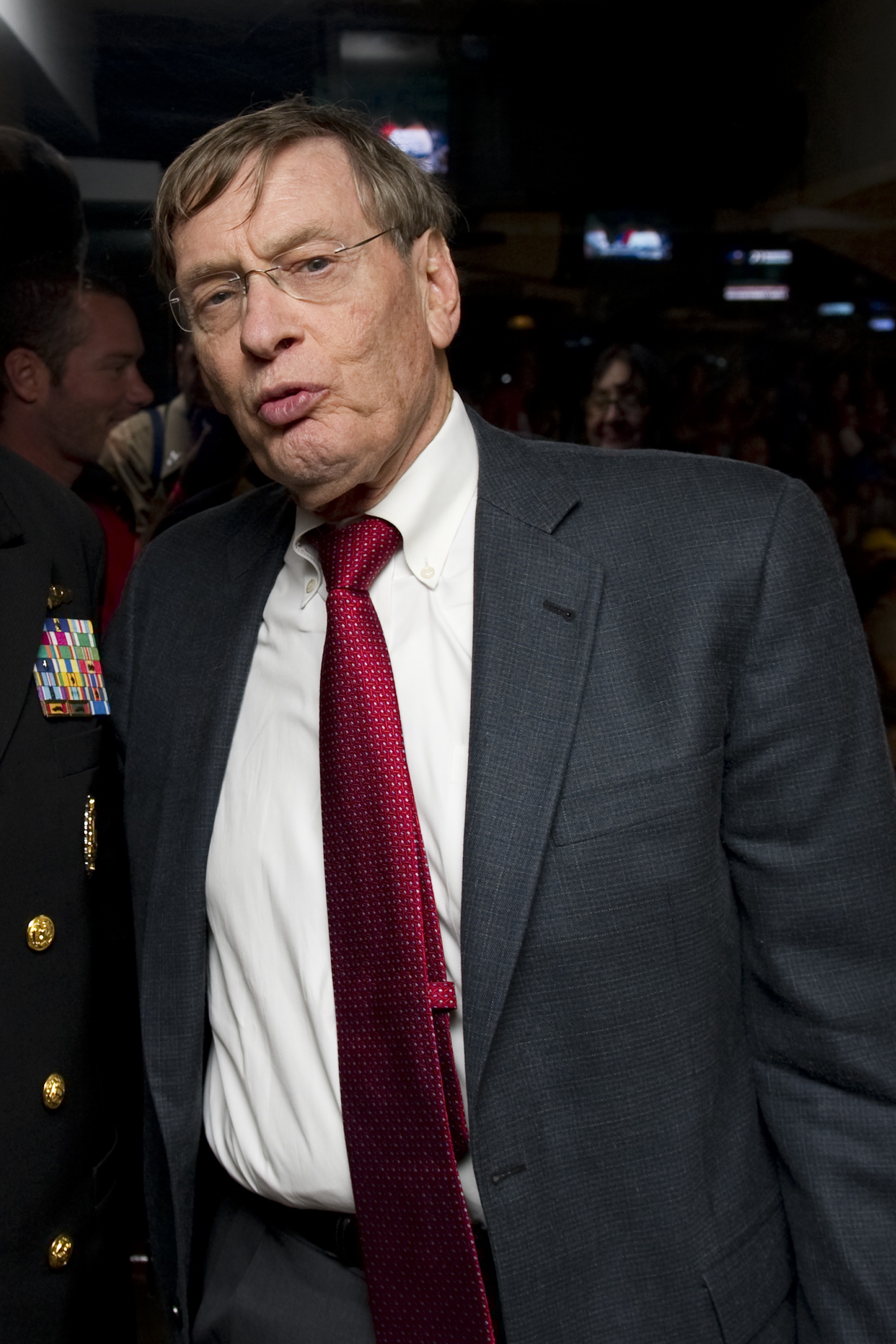
Bud Selig

Bud Selig served as the Executive Council chairman from 1992 to 1998, acting as the commissioner, and then was appointed as the official commissioner in 1998. Selig oversaw baseball through the 1994 strike, the introduction of the wild card, interleague play, and the merging of the National and American leagues under the Office of the Commissioner. He was instrumental in organizing the World Baseball Classic in 2006. Selig also introduced revenue sharing. He is credited for the financial turnaround of baseball during his tenure with a 400 percent increase in the revenue of MLB and annual record breaking attendance.

During Selig's term of service, the use of steroids and other performance-enhancing drugs became a public issue. The Mitchell Report, commissioned by Selig, concluded that the MLB commissioners, club officials, the Players Association, and the players all share "to some extent in the responsibility for the steroid era". Following the release of the Mitchell Report, Congressman Cliff Stearns called publicly for Selig to step down as commissioner, citing his "glacial response" to the "growing stain on baseball". Selig pledged on numerous occasions to rid baseball of performance-enhancing drugs, and oversaw and instituted many rule changes and penalties to that end.

Bud Selig helped introduce the following changes to Major League Baseball:

- Realignment of teams into three divisions per league, and the introduction of playoff wild card teams: one per league starting in 1994, and two per league starting in 2012
- Regular season interleague play (1997) and interleague games during the entire season (2013)
- Four additional franchises: the Colorado Rockies and Florida Marlins (now Miami Marlins) in 1993, followed by the Arizona Diamondbacks and Tampa Bay Devil Rays (now Tampa Bay Rays) in 1998.
- An unbalanced schedule formula that heavily favors intradivisional play (2001)
- Consolidation of the National and American League offices and presidencies under the direct auspices of Major League Baseball and inclusion of all umpiring crews into a common pool for American and National League games, instead of having separate pools per league
- Home field advantage in the World Series granted to the winner of the All Star Game in the same season (2003, changed in 2017 to not have an influence on home-field advantage in the World Series)
- Relocation of Montreal Expos franchise to Washington, D.C., becoming the Washington Nationals (2005)
- Stricter Major League Baseball performance-enhancing drug testing policy (2005)
- World Baseball Classic (2006)
- Instant replay used by umpiring crew to review disputed home run calls (2008). Expanded to all calls (except balls and strikes) starting in 2014.

During Selig's years of service, new stadiums opened in Atlanta, Cincinnati, Cleveland, Colorado, Detroit, Houston, Miami, Milwaukee, Philadelphia, Phoenix, Pittsburgh, San Diego, San Francisco, Seattle, Arlington, St. Louis, Washington, D.C., Queens, The Bronx, and Minneapolis. In addition, the venues now known as Angel Stadium in Anaheim, Fenway Park in Boston, and Kauffman Stadium in Kansas City underwent major renovations, and similar work began on Wrigley Field in Chicago.

Selig retired from the position after the 2014 season, officially yielding to his successor on January 25, 2015, at which time Selig became the Commissioner Emeritus of Baseball.

=== Rob Manfred (2015–present) ===
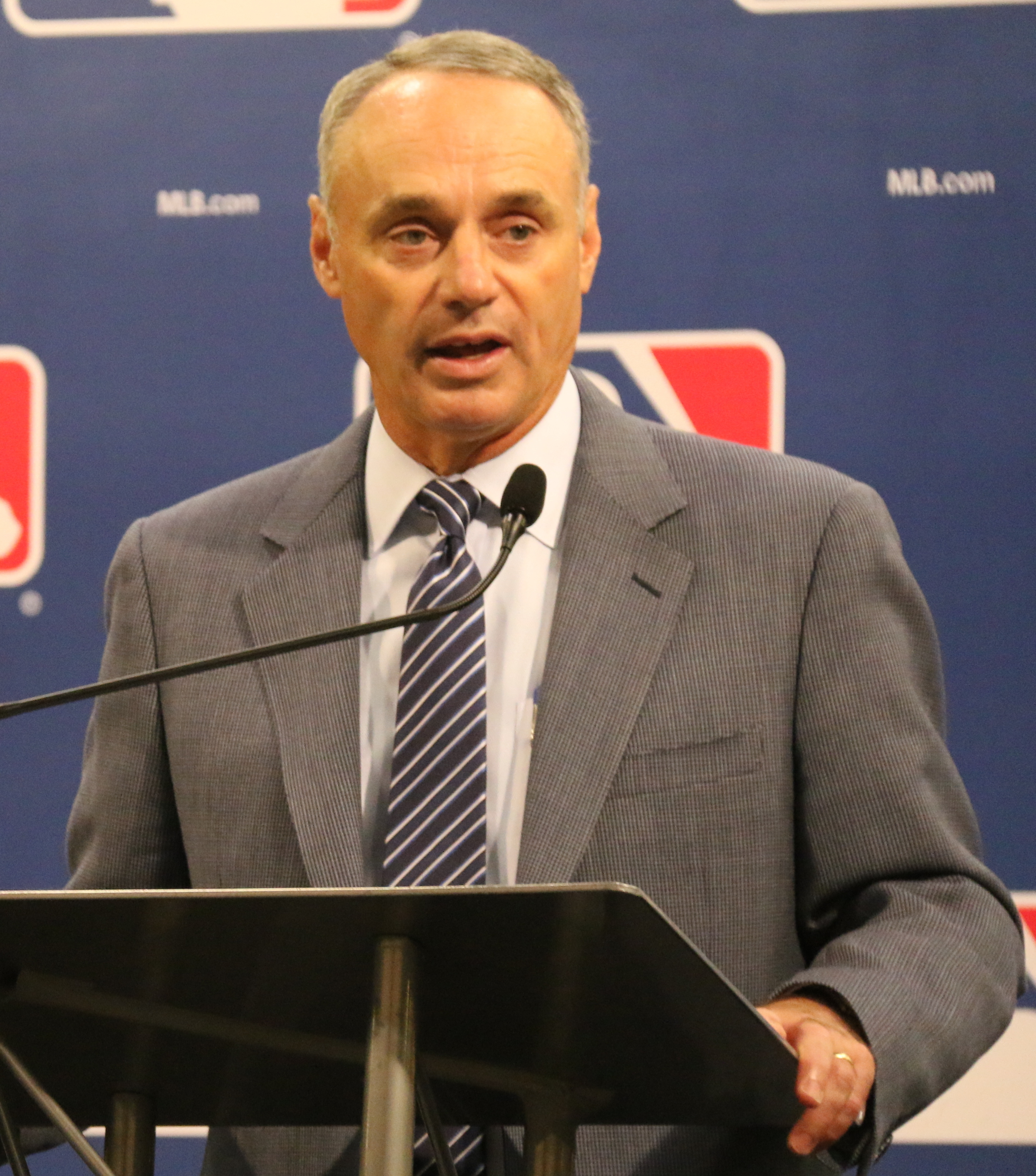
Rob Manfred

Rob Manfred was elected as the 10th commissioner of baseball on August 14, 2014. Manfred, who has worked full-time for Major League Baseball since 1998, was elected on the third ballot after falling one vote short of the 23 vote (3/4 super-majority) threshold on the first two ballots. It was baseball's first contested commissioner election in 46 years as Chicago White Sox owner Jerry Reinsdorf and Los Angeles Angels owner Arte Moreno led a group in support of Boston Red Sox chairman Tom Werner, who they felt would take a tougher stance against the players in labor negotiations. Manfred took over from Bud Selig on January 25, 2015.

Manfred's tenure has seen numerous changes to the game. In 2017, the intentional walk was changed, with pitchers no longer having to throw four balls to walk the batter, instead signaling to the bench. In 2020, during the COVID-shortened 60 game season, Manfred instituted further changes: the universal designated hitter rule (which became a full-time rule in the National League in 2022), a three-batter minimum for relief pitchers, using an automatic runner (often referred to by fans and the media as a "ghost runner" or "Manfred man") at second base to start each extra inning, and shortening double headers to two seven-inning games rather than nine innings each. In 2023, further rule changes saw limits placed on defensive shifting, enlarging the bases from 15 inches to 18 inches, and the adoption of a pitch clock, requiring pitchers to throw a pitch no later than every 15 seconds with bases empty and 20 seconds with runners on base.

While these changes have been polarizing, further criticism has been levied against Manfred for his seemingly "lackluster" punishments for the Houston Astros sign stealing scandal, including his highly-publicized comment in 2020 that the World Series trophy was "a piece of metal", moving the 2021 Major League Baseball All-Star Game from Atlanta to Denver in the face of Georgia's new voting laws, and his role in the 2021–22 Major League Baseball lockout, the league's first work stoppage in 27 years.

On May 13, 2025, Manfred announced that individuals would be removed from the permanent ineligible list upon their deaths and lifted the extant bans on all deceased players, including Shoeless Joe Jackson and Pete Rose, which also makes them eligible for induction into the Baseball Hall of Fame.

== Owners' "coup" ==
Tensions between commissioners and the baseball team owners who elected them, exacerbated by baseball's chronic labor conflicts with the Major League Baseball Players Association beginning in the 1970s, came to a head in 1992, when baseball owners voted no confidence in Commissioner Fay Vincent by a tally of 18–9. The owners had a number of grievances against Vincent, especially the perception that he had been too favorable to the players during the lockout of 1990. Unlike his replacement, Bud Selig, Vincent stated that the owners colluded against the players. Vincent put it this way: "The Union basically doesn't trust the Ownership because collusion was a $280 million theft by Selig and Chicago White Sox owner Jerry Reinsdorf of that money from the players. I mean, they rigged the signing of free agents. They got caught. They paid $280 million to the players. And I think that's polluted labor relations in baseball ever since it happened. I think it's the reason union chief Donald Fehr has no trust in Selig."

Vincent resigned on September 7, 1992. Selig, the longtime owner of the Milwaukee Brewers, was appointed chairman of baseball's Executive Council, making him the de facto acting commissioner (among the potential candidates for a permanent commissioner discussed in the media were future President George W. Bush, who was the managing partner for the Texas Rangers from 1989 to 1994, and George J. Mitchell, then-Majority Leader of the U.S. Senate). While acting commissioner, Selig presided over Major League Baseball during the 1994 players' strike, which led to the cancellation of the World Series.

Selig continued as acting commissioner until July 8, 1998, when the owners officially appointed him to the commissioner position. Having been an owner for 30 years, Selig was seen as having closer ties to the MLB team owners than previous commissioners. Selig's administration had many perceived successes, such as expansion and interleague play.

In May 2008, Bud Selig surpassed Bowie Kuhn as the second longest-serving commissioner (including his time as "acting commissioner" from 1992 to mid-1998), behind Kenesaw Mountain Landis, who died in office after 24 years of service. Beginning in 2006, Selig repeatedly stated his intention to retire at the end of his contract in 2009. However, on 17 January 2008, it was announced that Selig accepted a 3-year extension through the 2012 season.

== Current challenges ==
A prominent issue currently faced by Major League Baseball is the usage of performance-enhancing drugs, including anabolic steroids, by ballplayers in the late 1990s through 2009. Addressing the issue of whether Selig should have taken alternate actions, former commissioner Fay Vincent wrote in the April 24, 2006, issue of Sports Illustrated that with most of Barry Bonds' official troubles being off the field, and with the strength of the players' union, there is little Selig can do beyond appointing an investigating committee. Vincent said that Selig is largely "an observer of a forum beyond his reach".

Another challenge facing the Office of the Commissioner is competitive imbalance and struggling attendance in small markets. In 2010, just two teams (the Boston Red Sox and the Philadelphia Phillies) sold out every game, and many teams failed to draw 2 million fans. In the Office of the Commissioner's Blue Ribbon Panel on Baseball Economics, it was found that the luxury tax was failing to correct the competitive balance of the league and several steps were needed to correct the current state of revenue-generating and sharing.

== See also ==
- Commissioner of the NBA
- History of the NFL Commissioner
- NHL commissioner
- Leslie O'Connor (briefly served as Acting Commissioner after Landis's death)
