= Abbotsford Traditional Secondary School =

Abbotsford Traditional School

Location
- 2272 Windsor Street; Abbotsford, British Columbia, V2T 6M1; Canada; 49°02′38″N 122°21′18″W

Information
- School type: Public, high school
- Motto: Our Future, Our Responsibility
- Founded: 2004
- School board: School District 34 Abbotsford
- School number: 3434061
- Principal: J. Singh
- Staff: 30
- Grades: 6-12
- Language: English
- Colours: Red, Navy and White
- Team name: Titans
- Website: ats.abbyschools.ca
- Last updated: September 15, 2024

Abbotsford Traditional School is a public high school in Abbotsford, British Columbia, Canada, and is part of School District 34 Abbotsford.

== History ==
The school was established in 2004. Its original building was converted from the Mountain Park Community Church, who continued to hold services there. It is thought that it was the only school with a baptistery. The present premises were converted from the Career Technical Centre, and it shares the site with the Abbotsford Traditional Middle School. It is home to the Dr. Marg McDonough Memorial Library.
