= Disciplinary probation =

Disciplinary status for students or employees

Disciplinary probation is a disciplinary status that can apply to students at a higher educational institution or to employees in the workplace. For employees, it can result from both poor performance at work or from misconduct. For students, it results from misconduct alone, with poor academic performance instead resulting in scholastic probation.

For a student, disciplinary probation means that the student is on formal notice, and subject to special rules and regulations. The violation of these rules may lead to more severe forms of discipline, such as suspension, dismissal, and expulsion.

For employees, disciplinary probation is one common step in a scheme of progressive discipline. It is a common replacement, in non-unionized workplaces, for the progressive disciplinary step of suspension without pay. A usual period for such probation is 90 days. Some companies may place permanent employees on probationary status, particularly if their performance is below a set standard or for disciplinary reasons. In this instance, the employee is usually given a period of time to either improve their performance or modify their behavior before more severe measures are taken.

== See also ==
- Probation (workplace)
