= Eric Sim =

Canadian YouTuber and former baseball player (born 1989)

- Catcher / Pitcher
- Born: January 2, 1989 (age 37); Busan, South Korea
- Bats: Right Throws: Right
- Stats at Baseball Reference

Eric Sim

YouTube information
- Channel: Eric Sim
- Years active: 2020–present
- Genre: Vlog
- Subscribers: 1.01 million
- Views: 561.595 million
- Last updated: March 11, 2026

Eric Sim (Korean: 심 현석; Hanja: 沈贤锡; RR: sim hyeonseok; MR: sim hyŏnsŏk; born Shim Hyun-seok, January 2, 1989) is a South Korean-born Canadian YouTuber and former professional baseball player who played Minor League Baseball in the San Francisco Giants organization. Nicknamed "King of Juco", he was drafted by the Giants in the 27th round of the 2010 MLB draft.

== Early life ==
Sim grew up in Busan, South Korea, before his family immigrated to Canada at the age of 13. He attended high school at Robert Bateman Secondary School in British Columbia, and subsequently played for the Abbotsford Cardinals of the British Columbia Premier Baseball League (BCPBL) whilst in high school. After graduating high school, he desired to continue playing baseball. Although he had no college offers at first, he eventually signed with Colby Community College in Colby, Kansas, to play NJCAA baseball. He played there for a total of two years.

After that, Sim received a scholarship to play NCAA Division I college baseball at the University of South Florida in Tampa, Florida, where he batted .248/.366/.307 with the Bulls. He was then drafted by the San Francisco Giants in the 27th round of the 2010 MLB draft out of South Florida as a junior.

== Professional baseball career ==
=== Minor League Baseball ===
Eric Sim played in the Giants' Minor League Baseball system from 2010 to 2015. In his first two seasons, he played Rookie league baseball for the AZL Giants in the Arizona League. In his second season, he had a batting average of .352 with a total of 6 home runs.

For the next three seasons, he played in three minor league classes: Rookie, Single-A, and Triple-A.

His Triple-A stint was the highest level that he reached during his professional career, where he played for the Fresno Grizzlies of the Pacific Coast League in 2012. Sim played in two games for the Grizzlies, where he batted .500/.600/.500. He also played the 2012 season with the Augusta GreenJackets of the Single-A South Atlantic League and the rookie-league AZL Giants of the Arizona League.

Apart from Augusta, Sim spent the 2013 season playing for the San Jose Giants of the High-A California League.

In 2014, Sim played for Augusta and the Richmond Flying Squirrels of the Double-A Eastern League.

In 2015, he played for the Salem-Keizer Volcanoes of the Northwest League.

Between 2013 and 2014, Sim moved up and down the professional baseball hierarchy, ranging from Single-A to Double-A, before being released by the team in 2015 while playing Low-A, ending his minor league career. His final batting stats in the entire minor leagues were .230/.322/.333.

=== Independent League ===
In 2015, Sim signed with the Winnipeg Goldeyes of the American Association Baseball League. He played in a total of 7 games. After the season, Sim informally retired from baseball.

=== Career statistics ===
					Regular season
Season	Team	League	Level	Affiliate	GP	PA	AB	R	H	2B	3B	HR	RBI	SB	BB	SO	BA
2010	AZL Giants	AZL	Rookie	SF	11	43	37	2	4	0	0	0	1	0	2	8	.108
2011	AZL Giants	AZL	Rookie	SF	43	177	145	30	51	12	2	6	37	5	17	35	.352
2012	Fresno Grizzlies	PCL	AAA	SF	2	5	4	2	2	0	0	0	0	0	1	1	.500
2012	Augusta GreenJackets	SALL	A	SF	17	59	51	8	10	2	0	1	6	1	7	15	.196
2012	AZL Giants	AZL	Rookie	SF	3	4	4	0	0	0	0	0	0	0	0	3	.000
2013	San Jose Giants	CALL	A-Adv.	SF	17	65	58	3	16	3	0	0	10	0	5	13	.276
2013	Augusta GreenJackets	SALL	A	SF	63	240	207	20	40	7	0	2	20	2	16	59	.193
2014	Richmond Flying Squirrels	EL	AA	SF	7	22	19	2	3	0	0	0	1	0	2	4	.158
2014	Augusta GreenJackets	SALL	A	SF	45	179	154	17	30	6	0	3	23	2	15	49	.195
2015	Salem-Keizer Volcanoes	NORW	A	SF	26	0	0	0	0	0	0	0	0	0	0	0	.000
2016	Winnipeg Goldeyes	AA			7	0	0	0	0	0	0	0	0	0	0	0	.000

== Post-professional career ==
After finishing his professional career as a baseball player, Sim returned to Canada, where he worked as a bartender at his family hotel business in Duncan, British Columbia.

During the COVID-19 pandemic, while throwing baseballs at a park, he felt "disappointed" that he only threw a baseball at 77 mph. Over the next year, he started training with concrete weights and posted progress videos of himself on social media platforms, such as Twitter and YouTube, trying to reach the goal of throwing 95 mph from training at home. In November 2020, he finally threw 95 mph, achieving his goal and completing his challenge. By that time, he had already gained notable popularity on social media.

After he completed his challenge, Sim kept regularly posting on YouTube, where he gained a cult following and also became known as 'King of Juco'. His content consists of videos containing different challenges, accomplishments, collaborations, recreations, as well as other topics. He also collaborated with MLB players in multiple videos, notably Fernando Tatís Jr., Jackson Merrill, Julio Rodríguez, Jose Trevino, and Trevor Bauer. On the platform, Eric Sim is also an advocate for junior college baseball and encourages young players, warning them of the challenges.

Since partnering with Trevor Bauer, Sim also served as a bullpen catcher for the Diablos Rojos del México of the Mexican League when Bauer signed with the team in 2024.

Listed at 6'2" and 215 lbs during his playing career, as of February 2025, Eric Sim is currently 295 lbs, with a body fat percentage of 39.2% based on DEXA scan info submitted on YouTube.

In November 2025, Sim appeared in a MrBeast video that featured elite athletes competing against robots in sports. Sim was matched up against "Neo", a humanoid robot that is equipped with a baseball launcher capable of reaching 150 mph (241 km/h). Sim was given 10 at-bats to hit a home run against Neo in order to win. On his 7th attempt, Sim hit a home run, giving Team Human a 2-0 lead in the best-of-seven competition.
