= Robert Bateman Secondary School =

Robert Bateman Secondary

Location
- 35045 Exbury Ave; Abbotsford, British Columbia, V2S 7L1; Canada; 49.06911°N 122.25445°W

Information
- School type: Public, high school
- Motto: "Eye To Eye With Respect."
- Founded: 1993
- School board: School District 34 Abbotsford
- School number: 3434054
- Principal: Mr. Lance McDonald
- Staff: 60
- Grades: 9–12
- Enrollment: 972 (16 October 2014)
- Language: English (teaches Japanese and French)
- Colours: Green, silver, black
- Mascot: "Timber" the Timberwolf
- Team name: Bateman Timberwolves
- Website: robertbateman.abbyschools.ca

Robert Bateman Secondary is a public high school in Abbotsford, British Columbia. The school is part of the School District 34 of Abbotsford. The Canadian painter and naturalist Robert Bateman, whom the school has been named after, annually visited the school in the past. The school has won awards based on its Computer and Arts Programs as well as enjoyed the success in athletics.

== Sports ==
The school's athletic programs include football, girls' volleyball, boys' and girls' basketball, boys' and girls' rugby, golf, and hockey.

In 2018, the varsity football team lost in the provincial final (AA). In 2021 the Timberwolves advanced to the regional championship. In June 2019, the Robert Bateman Timberwolves senior boys' rugby team came 2nd in the province (AAA) while the girls' rugby team placed 3rd in the province (AA). In 2024 the junior boys' rugby team won the provincial championship.

== Notable alumni ==
- Josh Thiel, rugby player
- Eric Sim, former Minor League Baseball player
