= School District 34 Abbotsford =

School district in Abbotsford, British Columbia

Abbotsford School District

Location
- Abbotsford, BC Fraser Valley Canada
- Coordinates: 49.0528°N 122.3317°W

District information
- Superintendent: Nathan Ngieng
- Schools: 46
- Budget: $267,357,313 CAD; 2023-2024

Students and staff
- Students: 19,242
- Staff: 2,500

Other information
- Website: abbyschools.ca

Abbotsford School District (also known as School District 34) is a school district in the Fraser Valley of British Columbia. The district is located in the city of Abbotsford.

Shewan v. Board of School Trustees of School District No. 34 (Abbotsford) is a post-Charter precedent establishing that teachers have a professional responsibility to maintain public trust, and that off-duty conduct harming that trust can warrant progressive discipline.

== Schools ==
Name	Grades
Aberdeen Elementary	K-6
Alexander Elementary	K-6
ASIA - North Poplar	K-6
Auguston Traditional Elementary	K-6
Barrowtown Elementary	K-6
Blue Jay Elementary	K-6
Bradner Elementary	K-6
Centennial Park Elementary	K-6
Clearbrook Elementary	K-6
Dave Kandal Elementary	K-6
Dormick Park Elementary	K-6
Dr Roberta Bondar Elementary	K-6
Dr Thomas A Swift Elementary	K-6
Godson Elementary	K-6
Harry Sayers Elementary	K-6
Irene Kelleher Totí:ltawtxw	K-6
Jackson Elementary	K-6
John Maclure Community School	K-5
King Traditional Elementary	K-6
Margaret Stenersen Elementary	K-6
Mathxwí Elementary	K-6
McMillan Elementary	K-6
Mountain Elementary	K-6
Mt Lehman Elementary	K-6
Prince Charles Elementary School	K-6
Ross Elementary	K-6
Sandy Hill Elementary	K-6
Semá:th Elementary	K-6
South Poplar Traditional Elementary	K-6
Ten Broeck Elementary	K-6
Terry Fox Elementary	K-6
Abbotsford Middle	6-8
Chief Dan George Middle	6-8
Clayburn Middle	6-8
Colleen And Gordie Howe Middle	6-8
Eugene Reimer Middle	6-8
William A. Fraser Middle	6-8
Abbotsford School Of Integrated Arts	6-12
Abbotsford Senior Secondary School	9-12
Abbotsford Traditional Secondary School	6-12
Abbotsford Virtual School	K-12
Bakerview Ctr For Learning	9-12
Rick Hansen Secondary	9-12
Robert Bateman Secondary	9-12
W.J. Mouat Secondary	9-12
Yale Secondary	9-12

== Board of Education ==
The district is governed by the school board, which consists of seven trustees elected at-large every four years. The most recent election was on October 15, 2022. The next scheduled election will be October 17, 2026.

=== Membership ===
Name	Position
Shirley Wilson	Chair
Preet Raj	Vice-Chair
Rupi Kanda-Rajwan	Trustee
Korky Neufeld (until 2024)	Trustee
Stan Petersen	Trustee
Mike Rauch	Trustee
Jared White	Trustee

== See also ==
- List of school districts in British Columbia
