= Bullpen =

Warm-up area for relief pitchers in baseball

Bullpens

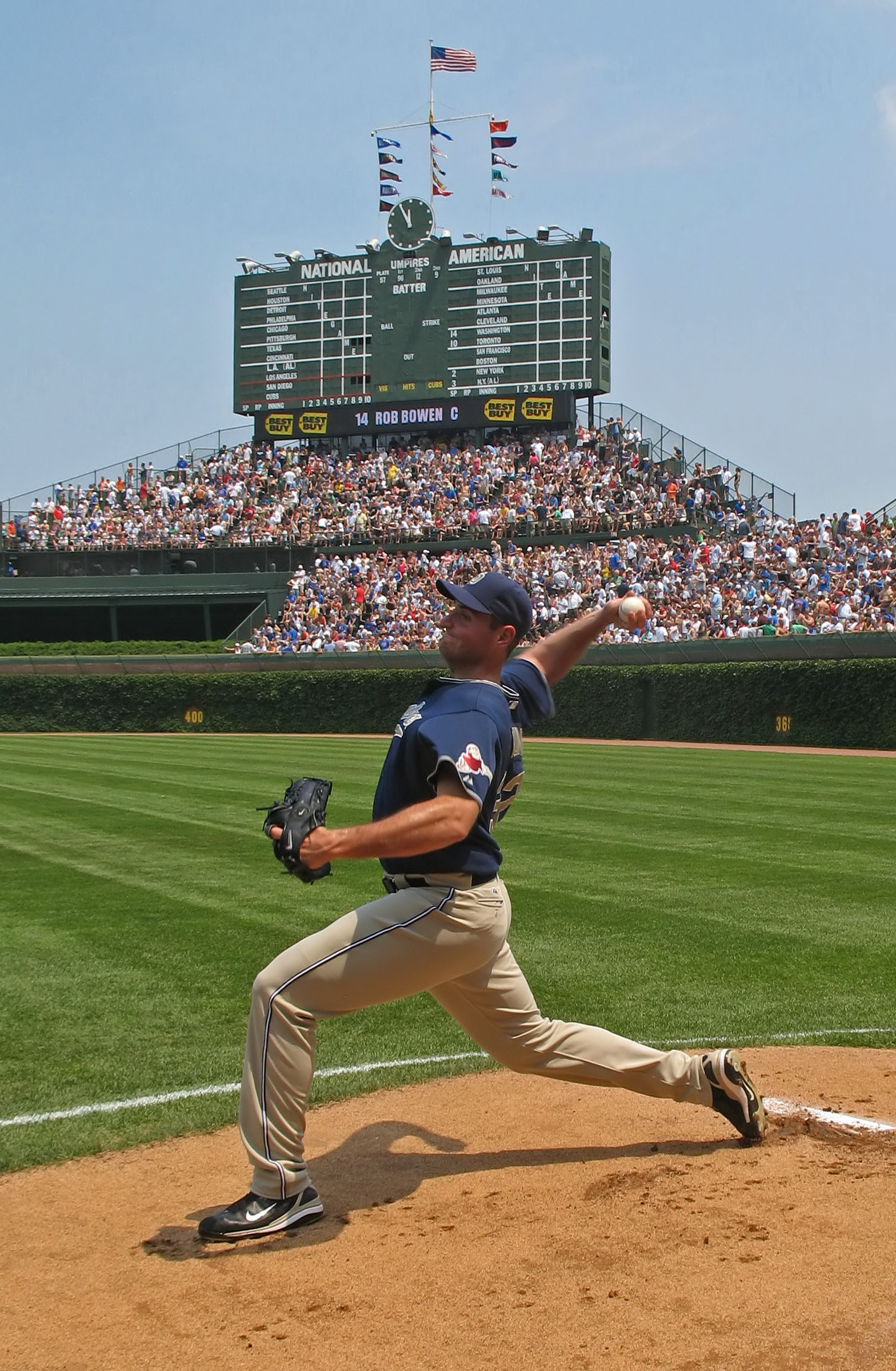
During pregame warmup the starting pitcher will loosen up in the bullpen. Chris Young of the San Diego Padres warms up in the former bullpen location at Wrigley Field prior to a game. This was an example of a bullpen located in foul territory on the playing field.

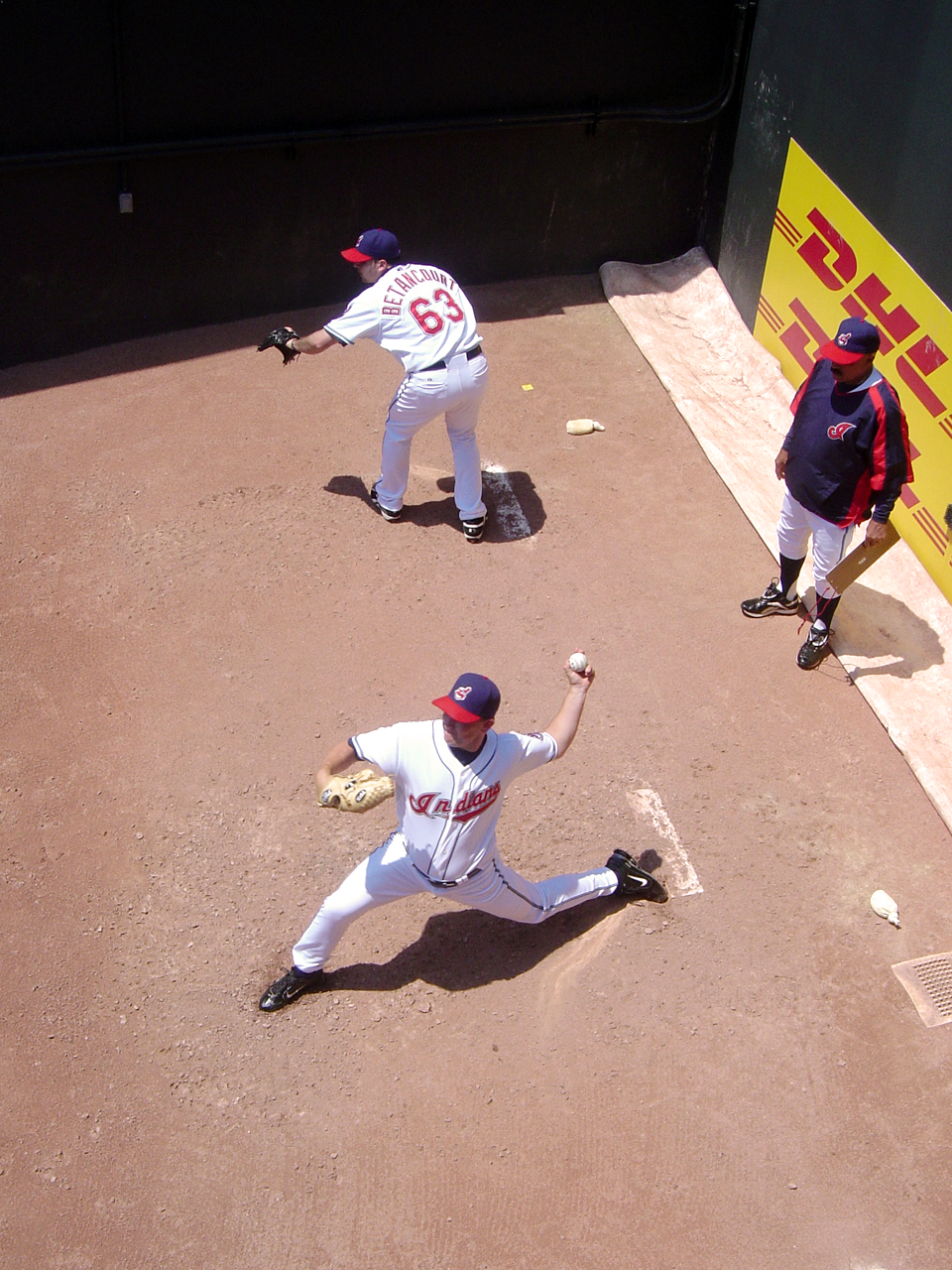
While the game is in progress, a relief pitcher warms up in the bullpen. Here Aaron Fultz and Rafael Betancourt warm up in the Cleveland Indians' bullpen behind the Progressive Field fence.

In baseball, the bullpen (or simply the pen) is the area where relief pitchers warm up before entering a game. A team's roster of relief pitchers is also metonymically referred to as "the bullpen". These pitchers usually wait in the bullpen if they have not yet played in a game, rather than in the dugout with the rest of the team. The starting pitcher also makes his final pregame warm-up throws in the bullpen. Managers can call coaches in the bullpen on an in-house telephone from the dugout to tell a certain pitcher to begin their warm-up tosses. Relief pitchers are often assisted in their warm-ups by specialized coaches known as bullpen catchers.

Each team generally has its own bullpen consisting of two pitching rubbers and plates at regulation distance from each other. In most Major League Baseball parks, the bullpens are situated out-of-play behind the outfield fence.

== Etymology ==
The term first appeared in wide use shortly after the turn of the 20th century, and has been used since in roughly its present meaning. Previously, in the late 19th century latecomers to ball games were cordoned off into standing-room areas in foul territory. Because the fans were herded like cattle, this area became known as the "bullpen", a designation which was retained when those areas became the spot where relief pitchers would warm up. According to the Oxford English Dictionary, the earliest recorded use of "bullpen" in relation to baseball is in a Cincinnati Enquirer article published on May 7, 1877, in which writer O.P. Caylor, using the original meaning, noted in a game recap: "The bull-pen at the Cincinnati grounds with its 'three for a quarter crowd' has lost its usefulness. The bleacher boards just north of the old pavilion now hold the cheap crowd, which comes in at the end of the first inning on a discount."

== Locations ==
In most major league ballparks, the bullpens are located out of play just behind the outfield fences. In some ballparks both bullpens are adjacent to each other while in others the bullpens are separated with each team's bullpen located on the side of the field corresponding with the same team's dugout. Often the outfield walls in front of the bullpen contains see-through areas to allow the bullpen to be more easily seen by both fans and the manager in the dugout, as well as to allow the players in the bullpen to more easily see what is occurring on the field.

For a time, many fields had their bullpens on the field of play, usually in foul territory, down the line from each team's dugout. This location has fallen out of favor as the bullpen mounds are considered a tripping hazard for fielders attempting to catch foul fly balls and the lack of enclosure leaves players exposed to being hit by line drive fouls or stray practice pitches. As of the 2026 season, only Tropicana Field bullpens are located in foul territory.

Wrigley Field featured an unusual orientation to its bullpen. During a major renovation in 2017, the bullpens were moved from foul territory to underneath the outfield bleachers, making it the first and only enclosed bullpen in a major league park.

== Bullpen cars ==
Between 1950 and 1995, varying numbers of MLB teams used vehicles to transport pitchers from the bullpen to the mound. These bullpen cars ranged from golf carts to full-sized cars. The 1950 Cleveland Indians were the first to use a bullpen car. The last use of a bullpen vehicle in this time was a motorcycle and sidecar used by the Milwaukee Brewers in 1995. However, the Arizona Diamondbacks, Detroit Tigers, and the Washington Nationals have since given relief pitchers the option of using a bullpen cart in the 2018 season.
