= Wrigley Field renovations =

Renovations of Wrigley Field, Chicago

Since purchasing the Chicago Cubs baseball team and Wrigley Field in 2009, the Ricketts family have been pursuing an extensive renovation of the stadium and the surrounding venue. At its outset, the 1060 Project (so called after Wrigley Field's Addison Street address) was projected to cost $575 million and was to be completed in four phases during consecutive off-seasons. Funding was generated from advertising revenue and increased corporate sponsorship in the form of additional signage placed in and around the stadium.

== History ==
The initial plan, revealed during the annual Cubs Convention in January 2013, called for a $575-million, privately funded rehabilitation of the stadium to be completed over the course of five years. The proposal included improvements to the stadium's facade, infrastructure, restrooms, concourses, suites, press box, bullpens, and clubhouses, as well as the addition of restaurants, patio areas, batting tunnels, a 5,700-square-foot (530 m^{2}) jumbotron, and an adjacent hotel, plaza, and office-retail complex.

Months of negotiations between the team, local Alderman Tom Tunney, and Chicago Mayor Rahm Emanuel occurred with the eventual endorsements of the city's Landmarks Commission and the Plan Commission and final approval by the Chicago City Council in July 2013.

== Funding ==
Increased advertising signage, in and around the park, help to fund the four phases of the renovation. Before the renovation began, the majority of the rooftop club owners that surround the stadium felt that such signs would obstruct their sight-lines and render them out of business.

=== Wrigley rooftops ===
Prior to 1980, the rooftops provided a vantage point and were a gathering place for free views of the ongoing Cubs games. Since the observers were the residents of the buildings, a few dozen people watching from the flat rooftops and windows of the buildings, with "seating" consisting of a few folding chairs, there was little commercial impact on the Cubs. When the popularity of the Cubs began to rise in the 1980s, formal seating structures began to appear, and building owners began charging admission; Cubs management became concerned about lost revenue and controlling their copyrights. In 2002, the Cubs filed a lawsuit against various rooftops for copyright infringement. In 2004, 11 of the 13 roofs settled with the club, agreeing to pay 17% of gross revenue in exchange for official recognition through 2023. With the Cubs and the rooftop owners reaching agreement, many of the facilities erected permanent seating structures. By 2014, 15 of those buildings' structures that were once residential apartments had evolved into rooftop businesses with multi-level facilities.

Before work on the project began, the team attempted to head off legal action from rooftop owners by offering to reduce the size and number of signs to be built, in order to gain their assent. Unable to reach an agreement with the rooftop owners as renovations began, the Cubs said that they would pursue the original 2013 plan to modify the park. Although some rooftop owners pursued legal action, courts ruled against them. By 2018, the Ricketts family owned 11 of the rooftops, operating them as Wrigley Rooftops, LLC.

== Beginning ==
The five-year renovation project, projected to cost $575 million, started as soon as the 2014 season was completed. Prior to the start of the 2015 season, both left and right field bleachers were expanded and the stadium was extended further onto both Waveland Avenue to the north and Sheffield Avenue to the east. Seven new outfield signs were installed along with a 2,400-square-foot (220 m^{2}) video scoreboard in right field. Construction was begun on new locker rooms and lounges to exist in an underground area that was excavated along Clark Street to the west. A 3,990 sq ft (370 m^{2}) Jumbotron was installed above the left field bleachers. It is topped with a sign advertising Rosemont-based Wintrust Financial, the Cubs' official banking partner. The "W" in Wintrust flashes after every Cubs home win.

=== Architectural team ===
In an effort to preserve the past while at the same time modernizing for the future, the Cubs engaged DAIQ Architects, a company with experience in modernizing Fenway Park in Boston, Massachusetts, Citizens Bank Park in Philadelphia, Pennsylvania, and Turner Field in Atlanta, Georgia. T. Gunny Harboe of Harboe Architects, a historic preservation architect who worked on the Rookery Building and Sullivan Center in the Chicago Loop, was selected to be the architect in charge of preserving the historic features and 1930s characteristics of the ballpark. VOA Associates, which helped design the new Navy Pier, provided construction drawings and Icon Venue Group is the project management company.

=== Structural engineering team ===
Thornton Tomasetti, a global structural engineering and architecture firm, first established in 1956 as LZA, with a Chicago based office, was tasked with designing the structural steel framework to support the new construction. Since the opening of Wrigley Field, April 23, 1914, over a century ago, several expansions (1922, 1927, 2006) and renovations have occurred (1937, 1988, 2014 2019).

January 2013, the structural assessment, evaluation, and documentation of the existing structural steel members of both the upper and lower deck of the grandstand bleachers, as well as the concourse, were underway. Thornton Tomasetti’s connection engineering (CE) team designed the structural steel reinforcement system needed to support the new addition and renovation.

The assessment, evaluation, and documentation of the existing, century old, structural steel system as well as the design and analysis of the new reinforcement structural system were completed in 2014, prior to the start of the 2014 season.

=== Phase One, 2014–15 off-season ===
The west parking lots adjacent to the field are the future location of Triangle Plaza and the Cubs' new office building. Structural steel and concrete work continued throughout the stadium complex during the 2015 season with the addition of new concession areas and restroom facilities, outfield group terraces and a reworked third-base side concourse.

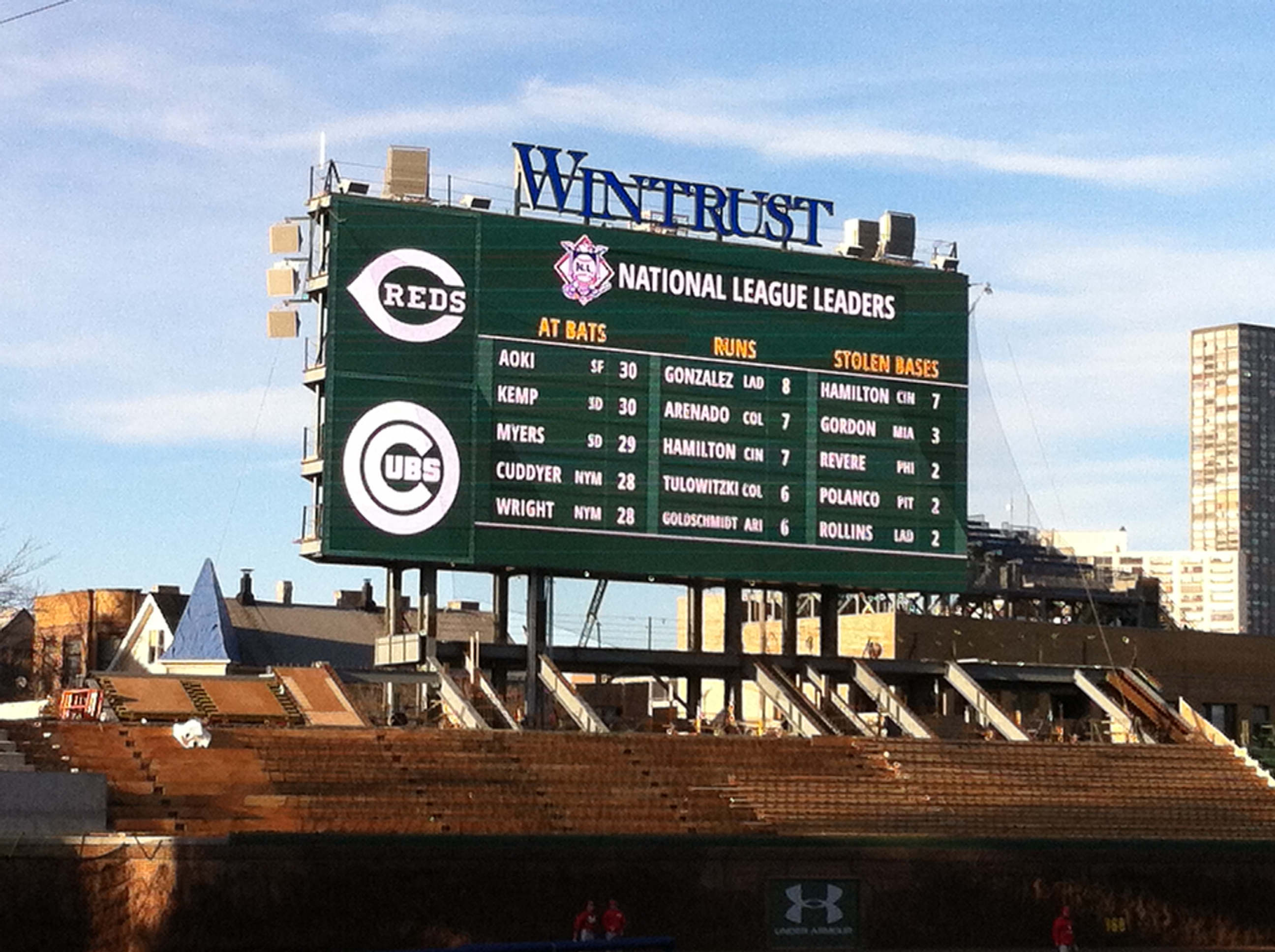
3,990-square-foot (371 m^{2}) videoboard overlooking left field bleacher seats

==== Protecting the ivy ====
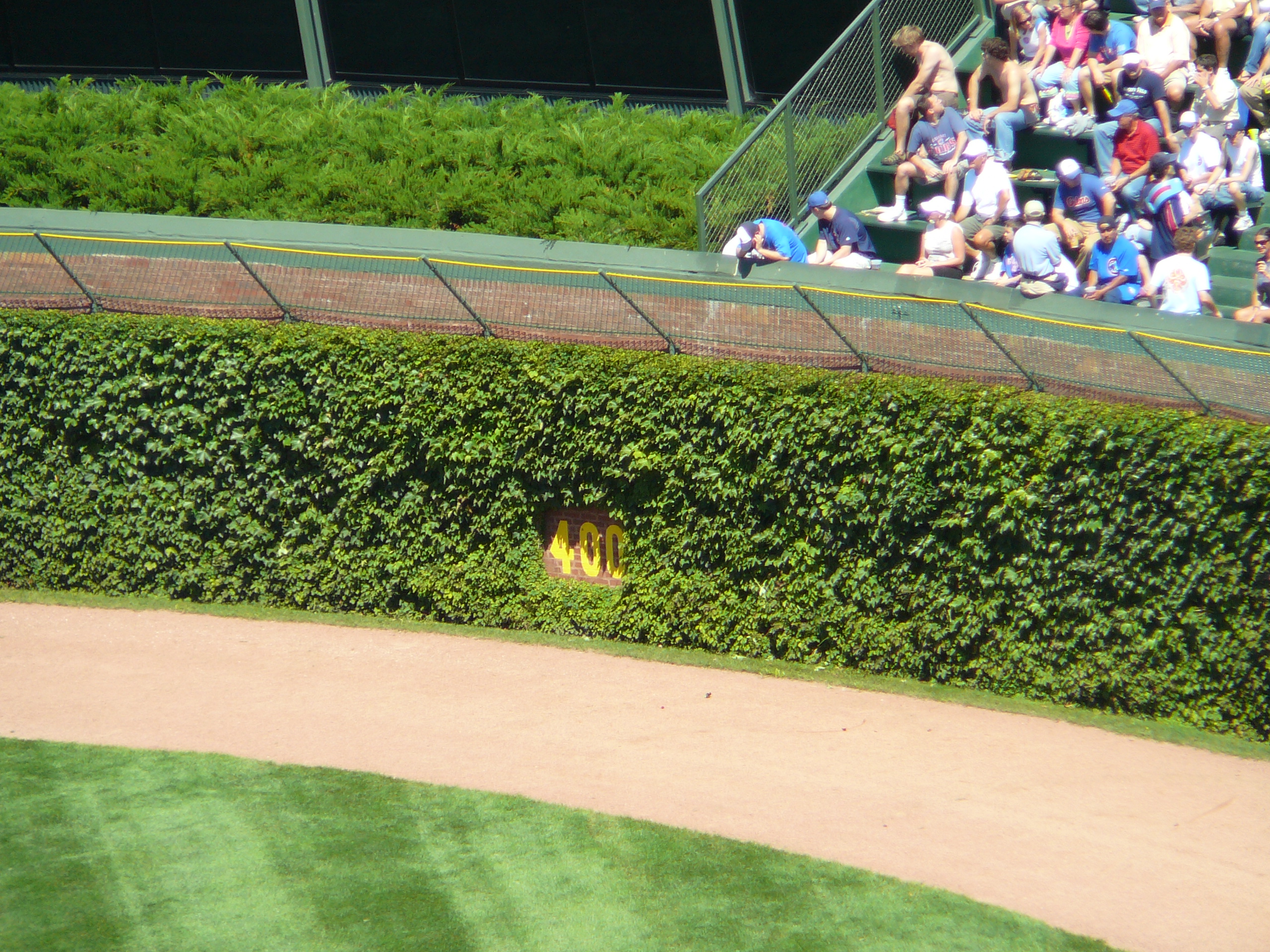
Wrigley Field's ivy-covered outfield walls in 2006

Wrigley Field has distinct outfield walls which are covered by a combination of Boston ivy and Japanese bittersweet. The ivy was planted 89 years ago in 1937, having been an idea of future MLB owner Bill Veeck years earlier.

==== 2015 season ====
Due to delays caused by cold weather and construction restrictions, the renovations in left and center field were delayed until May 11 while the right-field bleachers were finished in mid-June. Attendance during the opening weeks of the 2015 season was affected by the unavailability of approximately 5,000 bleacher seats. The announced crowd for the home opener against the St. Louis Cardinals was 35,055 while the second game of the series drew 26,814. Prior to the renovation, seating capacity for Wrigley Field was 41,160.

==== Triangle Plaza, west of the stadium ====
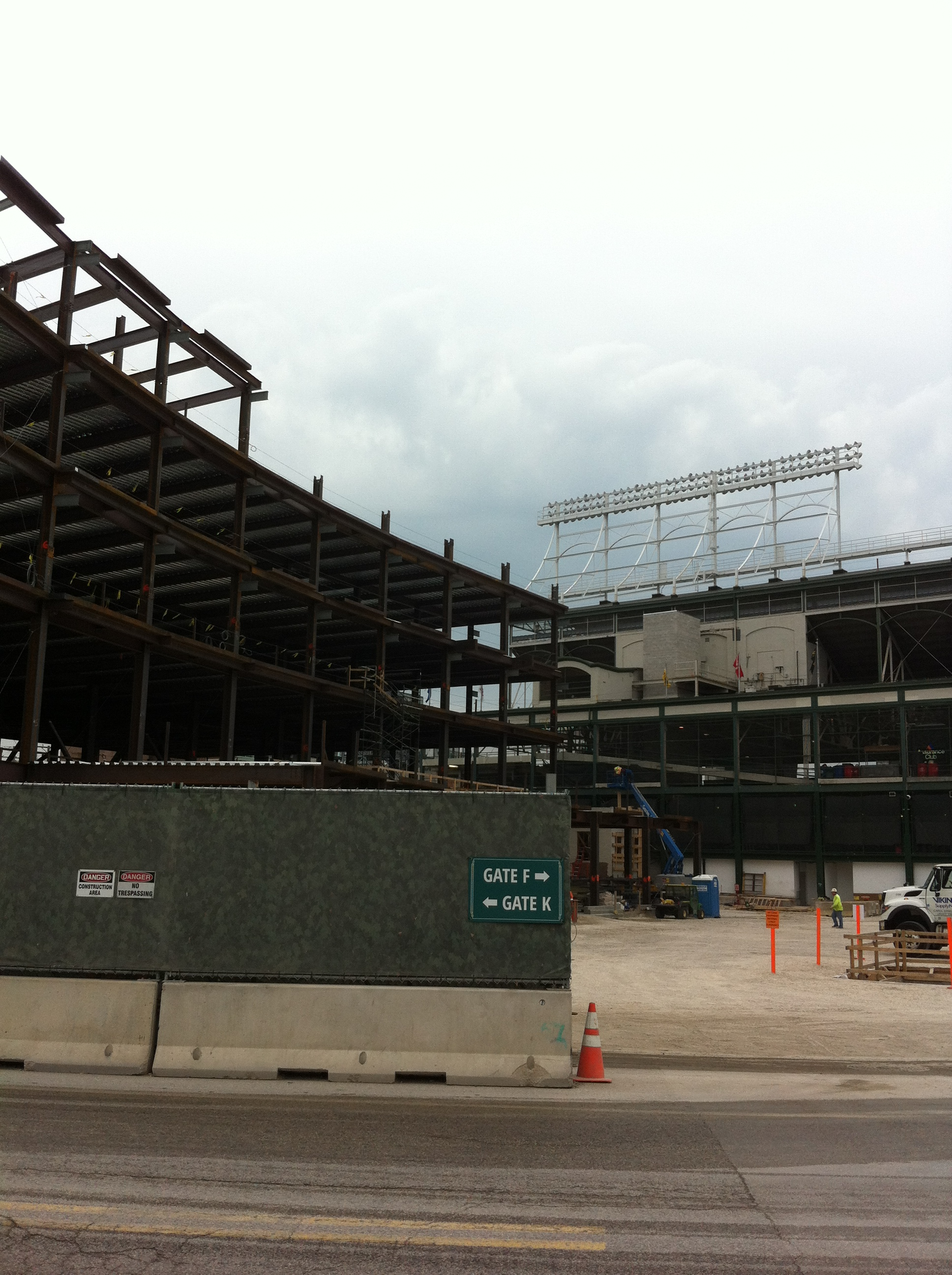
Triangle Plaza and future Cubs office building under construction at the conclusion of the 2015 season

Work continued throughout the summer of 2015 on the foundation and structural work for the Cubs' new clubhouse and office building as well as an open-air plaza and retail space. The excavation for the future home of the 30,000-square-foot (2,800 m^{2}) Cubs' clubhouse and new office building was completed in July. Work continued during the off-season and the completed clubhouse was ready by Opening Day of the 2016 season. Support columns for a six-story office building, which will house the Cubs' administrative offices and a ground-floor retail space, have been installed and the building is expected to be completed by late 2016.

== Middle ==
=== Phase Two, 2015–16 off-season ===
After the close of the extended 2015 season, work began to convert the excavated area just west of the field into a 30,000-square-foot (2,800 m^{2}) area for players' locker rooms, strength, conditioning, training and hydrotherapy sections, players' lounges, a media center and team offices. The previous clubhouse space will be utilized to enlarge the dugout and add two underground batting cages, an auditorium and more team office space. Premium and season ticket holders will be afforded a new "Third Base Club" next to the batting tunnels and a "Home Plate Club" will be introduced behind home plate. All seats, from the left-field foul pole to the main gate, will be removed and replaced and new concessions and bathrooms will be added. An upper-deck exposed concourse will be added along the south and west roof-line of right field. Improved bathroom facilities and additional concessions are included.

==== Marquee ====
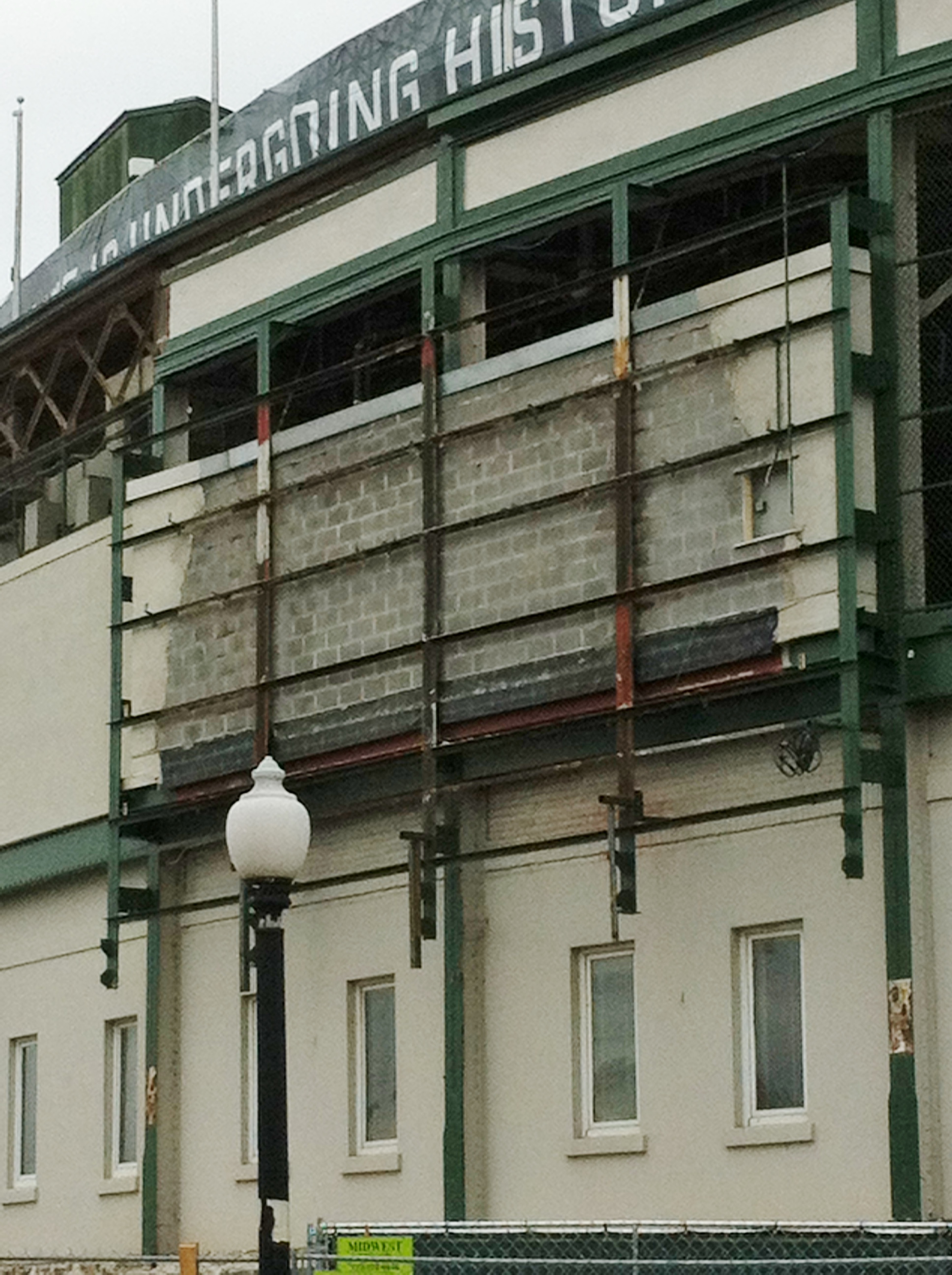
The neon marquee was dismantled and removed for renovation and refurbishment. It was replaced prior to the start of the 2016 season.

On November 2, 2015, workers began dismantling the marquee and relocating it for renovation and refurbishment. The marquee had been in place since 1933. The marquee was returned on April 5, 2016.

==== Statues ====
The statue of famed broadcaster Harry Caray was returned to the promenade outside the center field gate. The statues of Hall of Famers Ron Santo and Billy Williams were returned to the corner of Addison and Sheffield by the right field entrance. The Ernie Banks statue was placed at the Main entrance at the corner of Addison and Clark.

==== Improvements ====
- New terra-cotta and steelwork to replicate the original 1930s wrought iron.
- Refurbished ticket windows on the corner of Addison and Clark streets.
- Plaques honoring the 15 Chicago Cub Hall of Famers (near the main entrance)
- Signage and photo-op situations along the right field entrance.
- Repaint the old center field scoreboard
- Five display cases containing Cubs and Wrigley Field history.
- New hot dog venues behind the Marquee and in Right Field stands.

=== Phase Three, 2016–17 off-season ===
Upon the conclusion of game five of the 2016 World Series, off season construction preparations began for implementing the third phase of the 5-year project. Placement of a chain link fence around the external ballpark wall was temporarily delayed to allow Cub fans to continue to express their joy with chalk drawings and comments (as they had throughout the playoffs and into the World Series).

==== Improvements ====
- Structural improvements were implemented to the right field bleachers. Both home and visitor bullpen areas were relocated to areas under the bleacher seating. The Cubs bullpen is under the left field seats while the visitors bullpen is under the right field seats. New seating was added to the vacated bullpen areas. Seating was realigned along the right and left field foul lines.
- A visiting team "batting tunnel" was added. Right field concourse ramps and stairs were reconstructed and bathroom facilities under the concourse were improved.
- New padded seats were added in the area behind home plate.
- New flag poles were added along the back wall of the bleachers to accommodate World Series banners.
- The south facade and main entry gate was restored at the corner of Addison Avenue and Clark Street.
- The outfield turf was replaced just prior to the start of the 2017 season.
- The Hotel Zachary project is on-going.

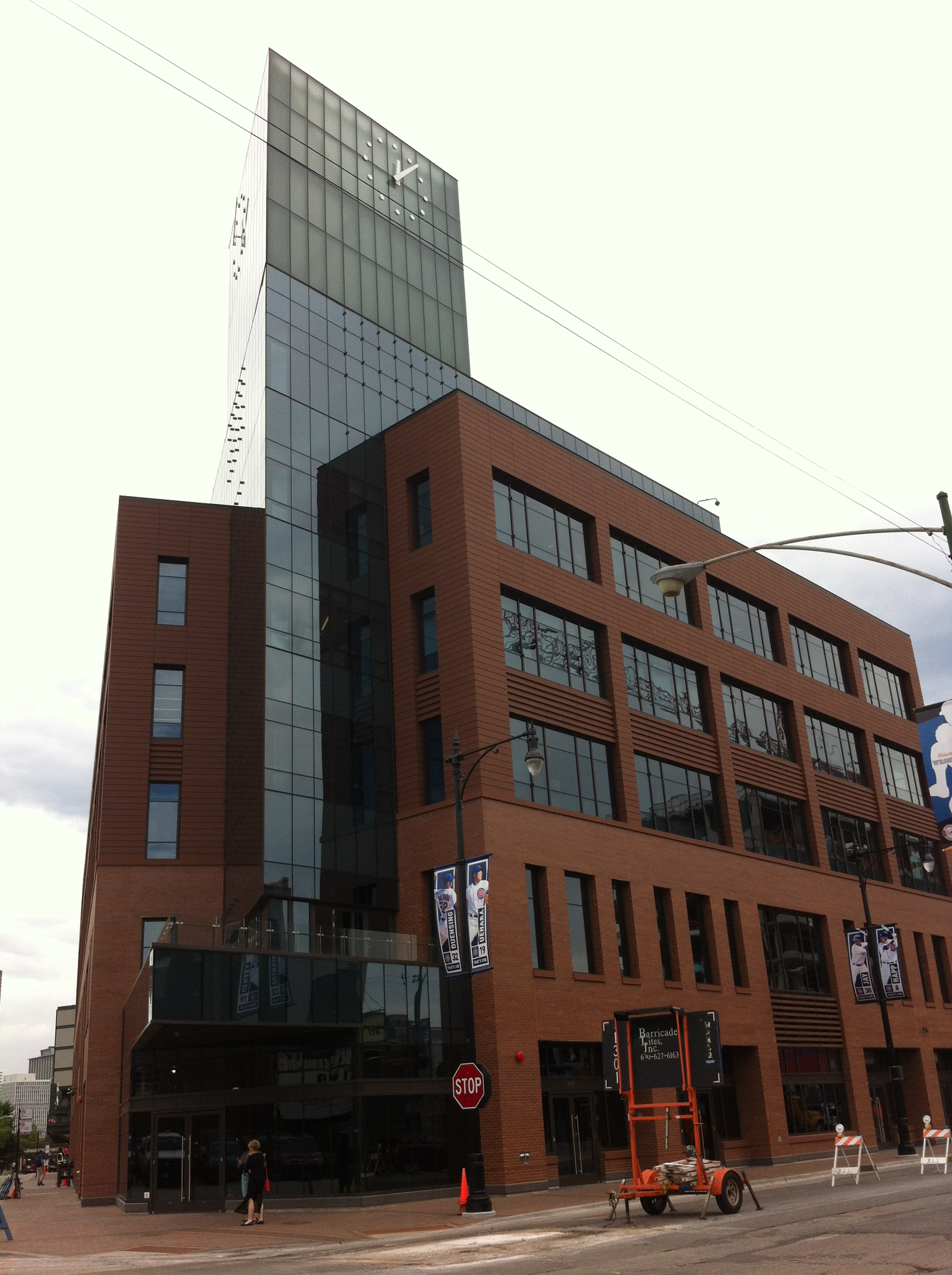
New administrative building just west of the park

- The new Cubs administrative building containing a new Cubs Store and construction of "The Park at Wrigley", above the Cubs players dressing room, is complete. The Park area is restricted as a "tickets-only" area before and during games but is open to the public at other times.

== Final ==
=== Phase Four, 2017–18 off-season ===
With the early conclusion of the 2017 season, permits were acquired and work began on the fourth phase of off-season improvements. The area under the seats behind home plate is the location of the new 600 seat American Airlines 1914 Club, the first of four premier luxury clubs planned around the park. Both players dugouts were relocated further down the foul lines prior to the 2018 season to allow for construction of an additional two clubs. They were also widened for maneuverability, with the home team dugout also being able to be removed and filled for football usage in order to allow a full 120 x 53 1/3 field to be configured (when the Chicago Bears played at Wrigley Field, the end zones were eight yards deep and could not host college games where the goal post was on the end line; from 1933 to 1973, the goal post was on the goal line in the NFL, so this configuration allows for a full 10-yard end zone). Two elevators were installed to access the upper levels of the ballpark. The fan safety netting was extended to the end of each dugout. The Hotel Zachary, across the street from the park, was opened just prior to the first home game. The last club, located in the upper level, is planned for the 2019 season.

==== Improvements ====
- American Airlines 1914 Club behind home plate
- Catalina Club in the upper level
- Extended safety netting around home plate

=== Phase Five, 2018–19 off-season ===
The final part of the 1060 Project implemented a renumbering of all the seats within the park to be in line with numbering procedures used in other MLB ballparks. The visiting team clubhouse has been expanded and renovated, with 40 lockers, a visiting managers office and a coaches room. Additional elevators to the upper deck and wheelchair accessible seats were added. Work on the Catalina Club, located on the upper level under the press box, is complete. It has a 400-person capacity. The upper deck has been enlarged onto extended patios for concession stands and increased restroom facilities and the aforementioned Upper Level Club along with a walk way. Upper-level seating has been updated. The Captain Morgan Club and the Draft King Club Zone were replaced with a two-story venue in a right field corner extension of the park with food and beverage concessions available just outside the gate. The left-field corner of the Bleachers now has a standing area for about 75 people. Former Gate F has been renamed as Gate 3 under the marquee. Players' banners are on display along Addison Avenue.

== Added year ==
In March 2015, just prior to the baseball season, Ricketts announced an additional year will be required to complete the 1060 project, bringing the project to the original five years projected.

== In media ==
In 2021, Saving Wrigley Field, a documentary about the project, was uploaded on the Cubs' official YouTube channel.
