= Progressive discipline =

Progressive discipline is a system of discipline where the penalties increase upon repeat occurrences.

This term is often used in an employment or human resources context where rather than terminating employees for first or minor infractions, there is a system of escalating responses intended to correct the negative behavior rather than to punish the employee.

In an employment context, the concept of just cause is usually at the root of progressive discipline practices. Just cause is a principle in collective bargaining contracts that forces employers to prove their grievances against employees.

== History ==
Progressive discipline evolved out of labor disputes and collective bargaining practices. Prior to the widespread implementation of 'Just Cause' clauses in union contracts, it was not uncommon to see onerous hidden requirements of employment for workers. Among the most famous is Ford's insistence on investigating the personal lives of his employees and issuing terminations for those whose personal life he deemed unseemly.

== Process ==
There are five steps of the progressive discipline model in a workplace. The stage chosen for a particular infraction will depend on a variety of factors that include the severity of the infraction, the previous work history of the employee and how the choice will affect others in the organization. The first four steps are typical for addressing minor incidents such as tardiness or missed deadlines. Those steps may be skipped, however, for more serious infractions such as assault or property damage to name a few. The steps are:

1. Informal Coaching Discussion. At this stage, a supervisor addresses a minor issue in a private and professional conversation. For example, if an employee regularly misses internal deadlines, the supervisor may ask about the cause and clarify expectations for completing work on time. The goal is to correct the behavior early without formal punishment. Even though the conversation is informal, the supervisor typically makes a note of it in a critical-incident or supervisory file for documentation purposes.
2. Verbal Warning. If the behavior continues, the company moves to a formal oral warning. The supervisor clearly explains that the behavior is unacceptable and outlines what must change. For instance, if an employee repeatedly fails to follow customer service procedures after coaching, the supervisor would explain the required standards and set clear expectations for improvement. Although the warning is given verbally, it is usually documented in the employee’s record. This step communicates that the issue is serious and must be corrected.
3. Written Warning. At this point, the supervisor prepares a formal document describing the issue, previous discussions, and the expectations for improvement. Many companies use standard forms to ensure consistency. For example, if an employee continues to use inappropriate language in the workplace despite prior warnings, the written notice would describe the incidents and explain what behavior is expected moving forward. The supervisor reviews the document with the employee, who is typically asked to sign it to confirm receipt. The signed document is then placed in the employee’s personnel file.
4. Disciplinary Suspension. If the problem is not corrected, the company may impose a disciplinary suspension. This step removes the employee from work for a set period, usually between one day and one week. Suspensions are often unpaid, which shows the seriousness of the situation. However, some companies use a paid suspension to allow the employee time to reflect on whether they want to continue working for the organization. For example, repeated violations of safety policies may result in suspension. This step makes clear that continued misconduct will lead to more serious consequences.
5. Dismissal or termination. If the employee does not improve after coaching, warnings, and suspension, the company may decide to end the employment relationship. When the progressive discipline process has been properly followed and documented, termination should not come as a surprise. Careful documentation also helps protect the company by showing that the decision was based on legitimate business reasons, reducing the risk of legal claims for wrongful termination.

Although regression to previous steps is acceptable once enough time passes, there sometimes exists a step between suspension and termination. Management or Human Resources may consider demotion or transfer out of the role as the employee may feel overwhelmed by the duties.

== See also ==
- Disciplinary probation
