= List of Curb Records artists =

The following is a list of acts who have recorded either on Curb Records, Bruc Records, Asylum-Curb or Word Records. An * marks an artist no longer recording for the label.

== #-B ==
- 4HIM*
- About a Mile (Word-Curb)
- Susie Allanson
- Airkraft*
- American Young
- Meredith Andrews
- Paul Anka*
- Eddy Arnold*
- Rodney Atkins
- Baker & Myers*
- Bananarama*
- Bandit Brothers*
- BarlowGirl*
- The Beat Farmers*
- The Bellamy Brothers* (Curb, formerly on Curb/Warner Bros., Curb/Elektra, Curb/MCA)
- Mary Black
- Blake & Brian*
- Blue County*
- Bomshel*
- Debby Boone*
- Tony Booth
- Boy Howdy*
- Lee Brice
- Lisa Brokop*
- Junior Brown*
- Keith Brown*
- T. Graham Brown*
- Jann Browne*
- Sherry Bryce* (MGM/Curb)
- Billy Burnette*
- Burnin' Daylight*
- Billy Currington*

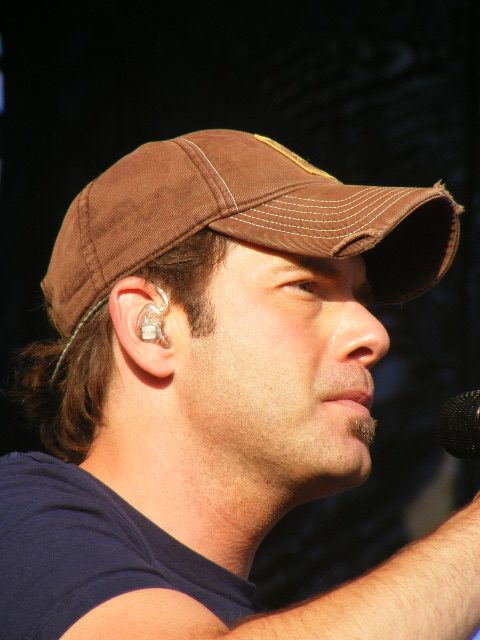
Rodney Atkins

== C-E ==
- Patty Cabrera*
- Cactus Choir*
- Jeff Carson*
- Shaun Cassidy* (Warner/Curb)
- Cee Cee Chapman*
- Donovan Chapman*
- Petula Clark*
- The Clark Family Experience*
- Philip Claypool*
- Cowboy Crush* (Asylum-Curb)
- Mike Curb Congregation
- Billy Ray Cyrus* (Word/Warner/Curb)
- Amy Dalley*
- Star De Azlan
- Billy Dean (Asylum-Curb)
- The Desert Rose Band* (MCA/Curb)
- deSoL*
- The Driven
- Hannah Ellis
- Michael English*
- Exile* (Warner Bros./Curb)
- Eyes*

== F-H ==
- Fisk Jubilee Singers
- Florida Georgia Line*
- For King & Country (Fervent/Curb)
- Francesca Battistelli (Fervent/Curb)
- Fun Factory*
- Leif Garrett*
- Gloria Gaynor*
- Ashley Gearing (Asylum-Curb)
- Don Gibson*
- Bobby Goldsboro*
- Amy Grant* (Word/Warner/Curb)
- Natalie Grant
- Lee Greenwood*
- Gregorian*
- Group 1 Crew*
- Merle Haggard*
- Kelsey Hart
- Brad Hawkins*
- Steve Holy*
- Ray Hood* (Caption/Curb)
- Mallary Hope
- James T. Horn* (Curb/Universal)

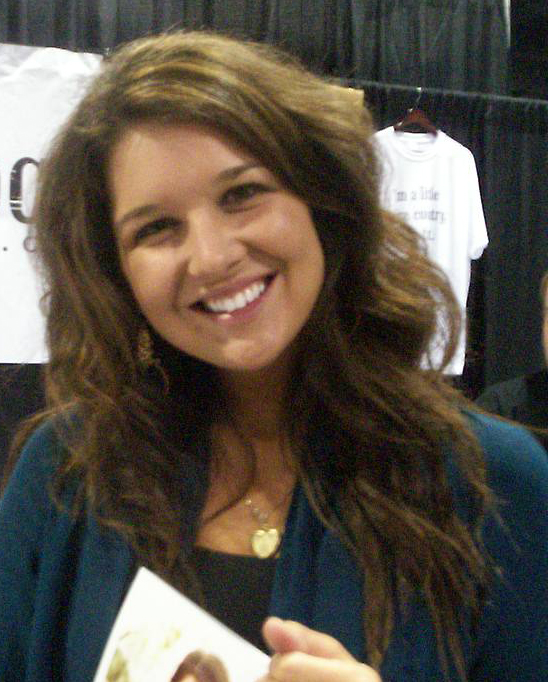
Mallary Hope

== J-L ==
- Jana
- JJ White*
- Cledus T. Judd* (Asylum-Curb)
- The Judds* (RCA/Curb, MCA/Curb, Mercury/Curb)
- Just Jinjer
- Wynonna Judd (Asylum-Curb; formerly on MCA/Curb, Universal/Curb, and Mercury/Curb)
- Kaci
- The Kendalls*
- Brian Kennedy
- David Kersh*
- Hal Ketchum*
- Jesse Kinch
- Bill LaBounty* (Warner Bros./Curb)
- Rachael Lampa* (Word/Warner/Curb)
- Kimberley Locke*
- Josh Logan*
- Lyle Lovett (Lost Highway/Curb, formerly on MCA/Curb)
- Ruby Lovett*

== M-O ==
- Shane McAnally*
- C. W. McCall*
- Delbert McClinton* (Curb, Rising Tide/Curb)
- Ronnie McDowell*
- Tim McGraw*
- Ken Mellons*
- MercyMe*
- Jo Dee Messina*
- Marie Miller
- Nemesis
- Heidi Newfield*
- Jerrod Niemann
- The Nitty Gritty Dirt Band*
- OBB
- Fernando Ortega (Word/Warner/Curb)
- Donny Osmond*
- Marie Osmond* (Capitol/Curb)
- The Osmonds*
- Old Dominion
- Buck Owens*

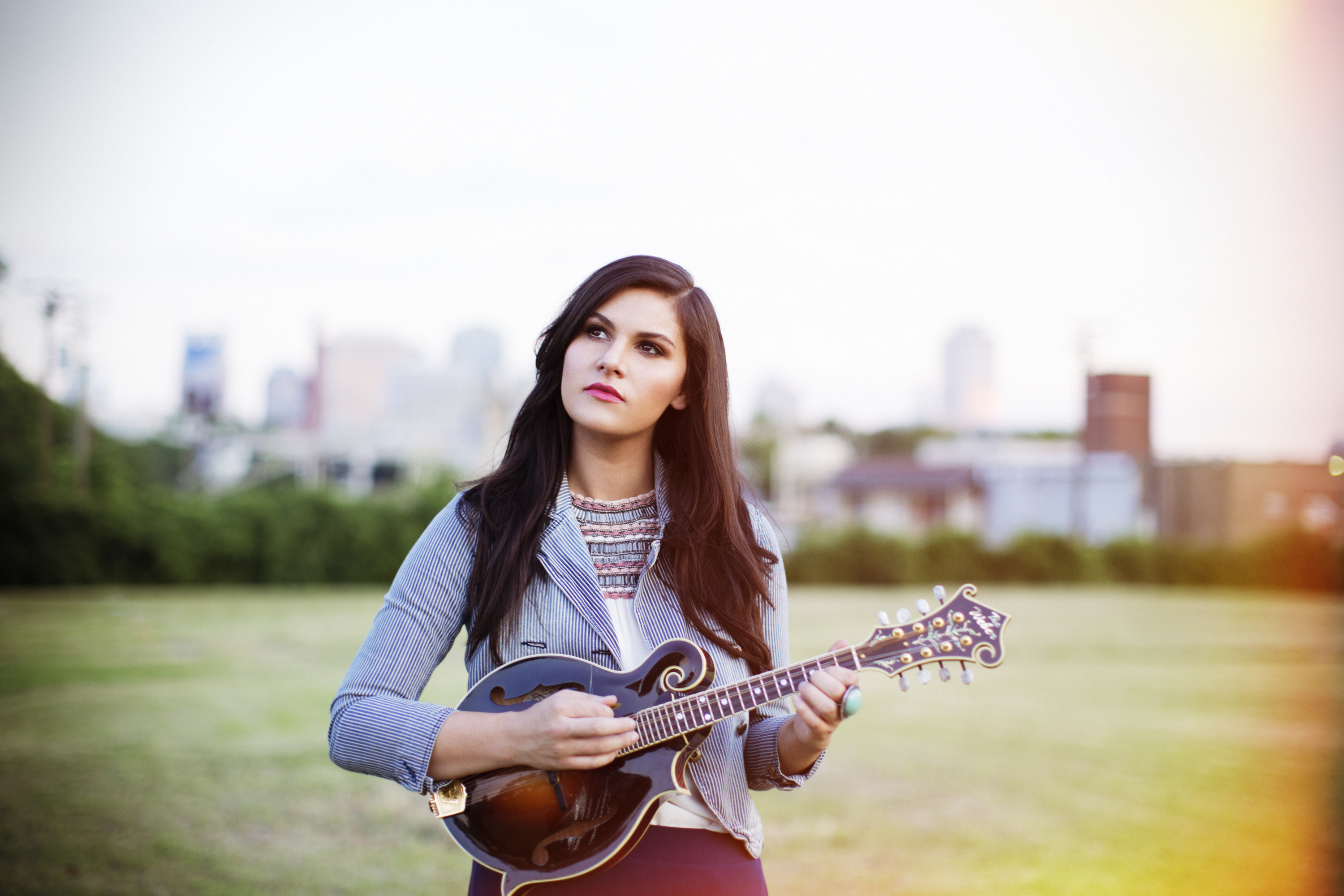
Marie Miller

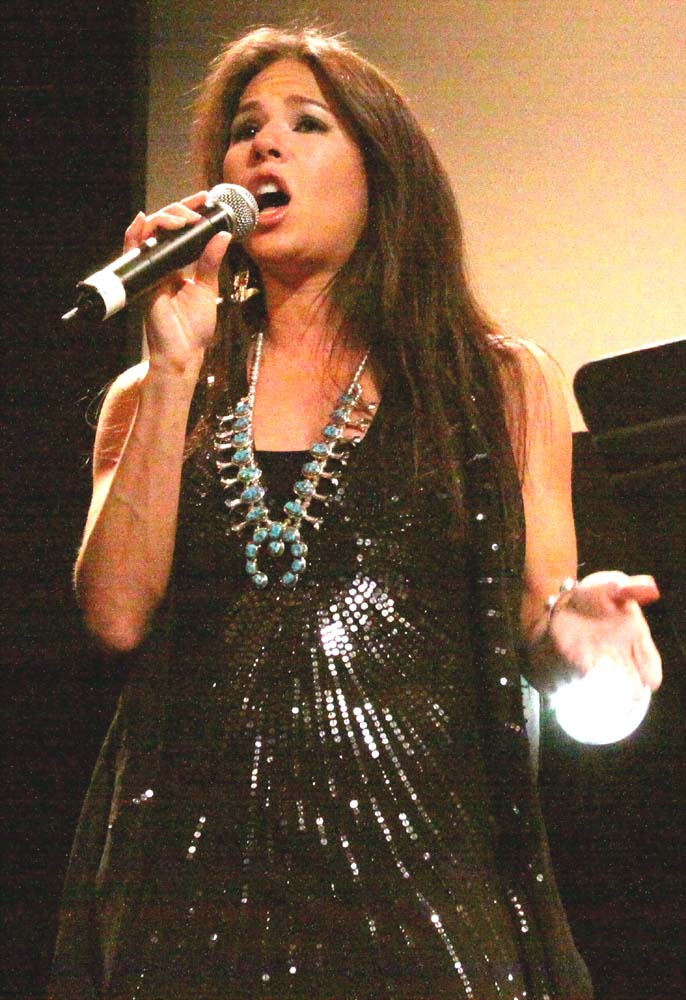
Janna Mashonee

== P-S ==
- Perfect Stranger*
- Keith Perry*
- Jonathan Pierce
- Pink Lady* (Elektra/Curb)
- Mo Pitney
- Plumb*
- Point of Grace
- pureNRG
- Real Life*
- LeAnn Rimes*
- Rio Grand
- Kenny Rogers*
- Nate Sallie*
- Dylan Scott (Curb/Sidewalk)
- Nicol Sponberg* (aka Nicol Smith)
- Sawyer Brown* (initially on Capitol/Curb)
- Selah (including Nicol Spongberg, Melodie Crittenden, and Amy Perry)
- Seminole* (Curb/Universal)
- T. G. Sheppard* (Warner Bros./Curb)
- Six Shooter*
- Sixpence None the Richer
- Jamie Slocum
- Todd Smith
- Smokin' Armadillos*
- Jeffrey Steele*
- Ray Stevens* (initially on Capitol/Curb)
- Sweetwater Rain

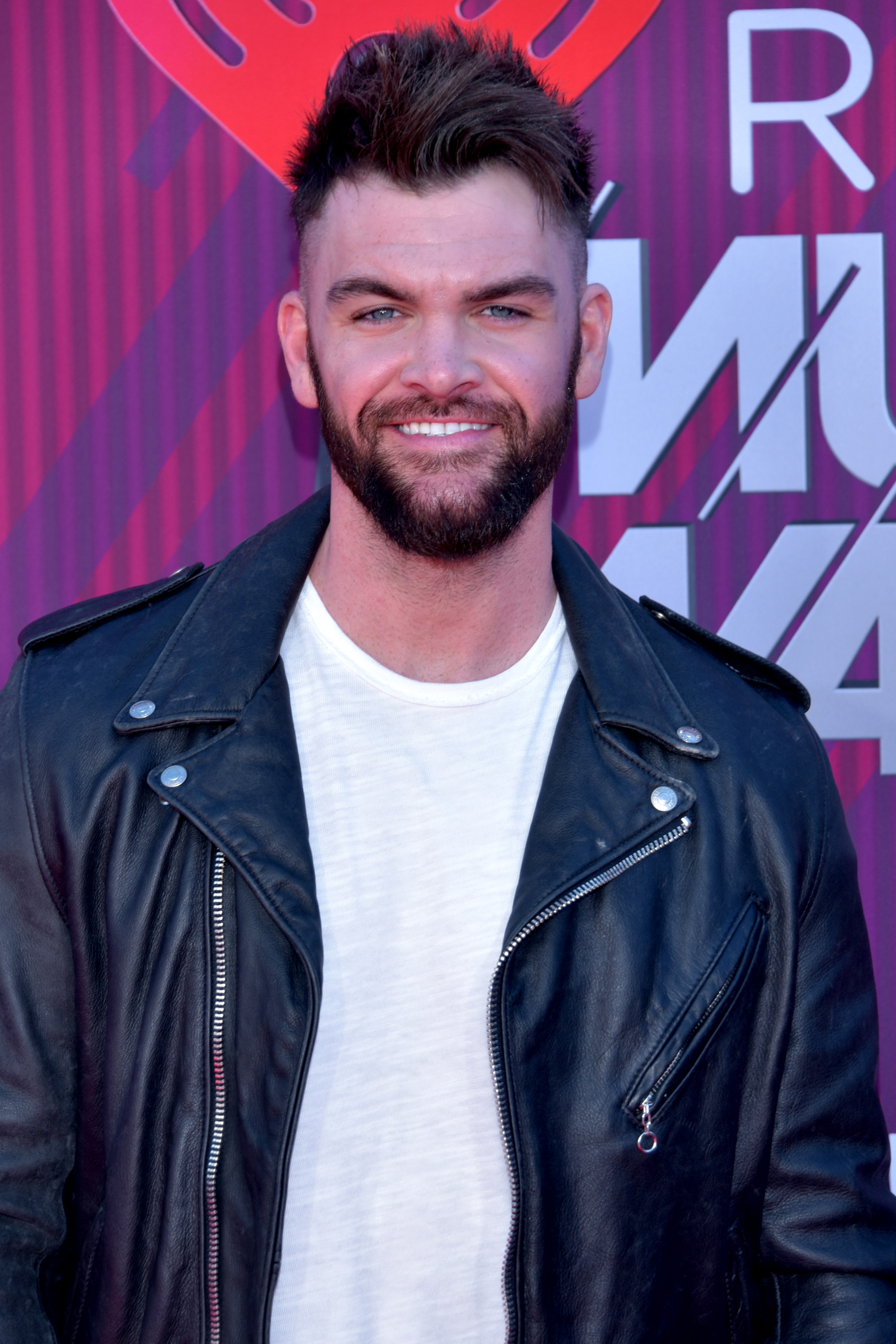
Dylan Scott 2019

== T-W ==
- B.J. Thomas*
- Mel Tillis*
- Tony Toliver* (Curb/Rising Tide)
- Tompall & The Glaser Brothers* (including Chuck, Jim, and Tompall Glaser) (MGM/Curb)
- Randy Travis (Word/Warner/Curb)
- Trick Pony* (Asylum-Curb)
- Trini Triggs
- Rick Vincent*
- Clay Walker (Asylum-Curb)
- Tamara Walker*
- Dale Watson*
- Gene Watson*
- Whigfield*
- The Whites*
- Hank Williams, Jr.* (Elektra-Curb, formerly on Warner Bros./Curb)
- Hank Williams III* (Bruc, formerly on Curb)
- Stephanie Winslow* (Warner Bros./Curb)

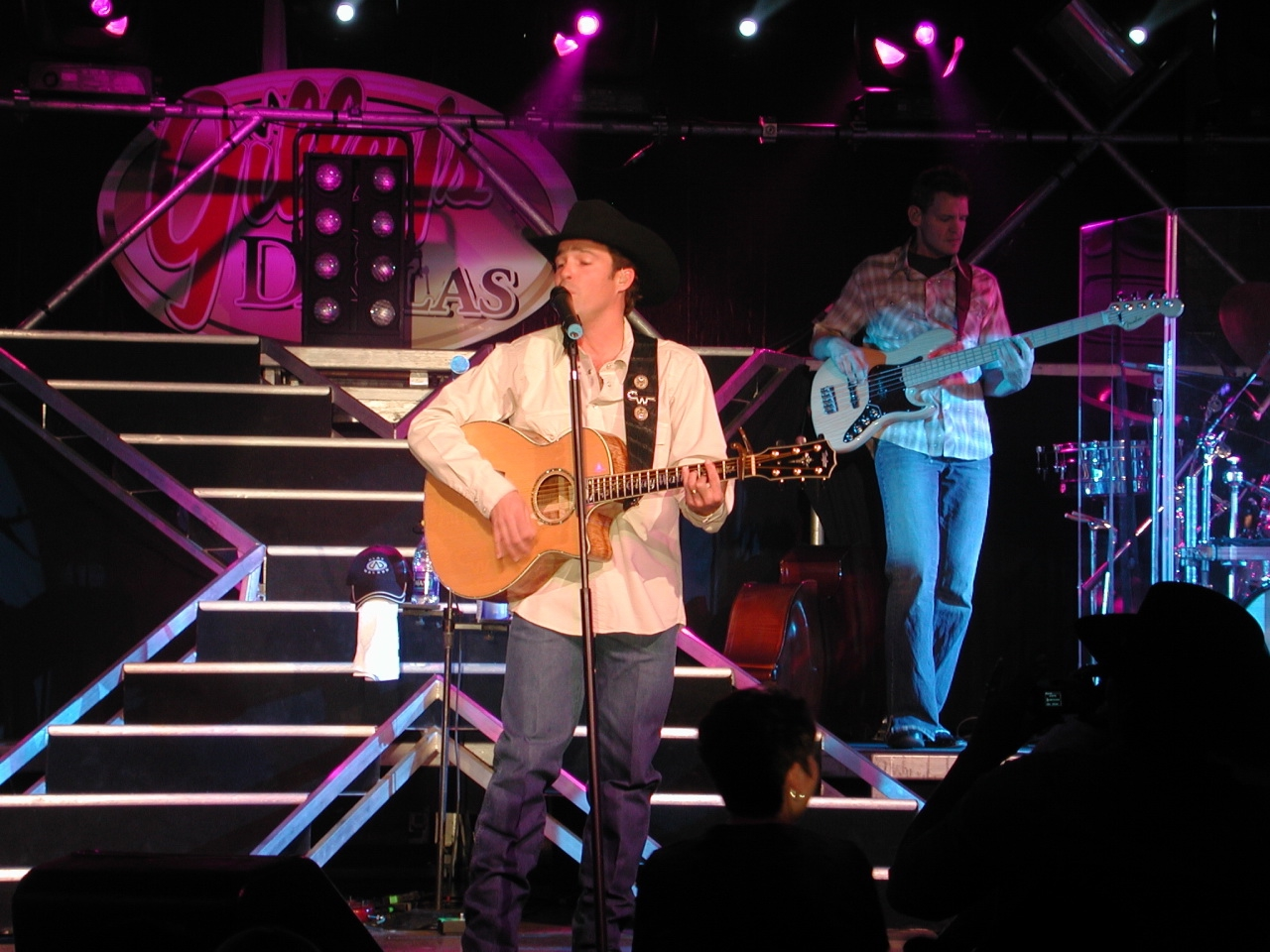
Clay Walker

== Y-Z ==
- Billy Yates*
- Pia Zadora*
