= James H. Harless =

American businessman and politician

Mayor of Gilbert, West Virginia
- In office 1959–1963

Personal details
- Born: October 14, 1919 Taplin, West Virginia
- Died: January 1, 2014 (aged 94) Gilbert, West Virginia
- Party: Republican
- Other political affiliations: People's Party
- Spouses: June Montgomery (m. 1939; died 1999) Hallie Lois Chapman (m. 2001)
- Children: Larry Joe; Judy
- Relatives: Bud Harless (half-brother)
- Occupation: coal mine laborer, timber operator, philanthropist
- Board member of: C&P Telephone (fl. 1977–1987); Massey Energy (2001–2005)

James Howard Harless (October 14, 1919 – January 1, 2014), better known as Buck Harless, was an American coal and timber operator and philanthropist, who was renowned in the area of his hometown of Gilbert, West Virginia, for his extensive contributions to schools, churches, healthcare and education programs.

Starting out his career working with coal mining and coal preparation, Harless saved up money and eventually invested in a sawmill where he produced mining equipment. After having managed his lumber company for several years, he sold the business to Georgia-Pacific and signed a non-compete clause which disallowed him from producing timber in the area for a period of 10 years. He instead established sawmills in South America and Central America, and returned to the mining industry as an executive. He also founded and acquired several other companies in a number of different industries, which were managed under the conglomerate International Industries. Outside of his own companies, he was active in banks and healthcare systems, and sat on the boards of colleges and universities, including West Virginia University, Marshall University, Davis & Elkins College and Concord University.

A staunch Republican supporter, Harless was instrumental in allowing George W. Bush to win the traditionally Democratic state of West Virginia in the 2000 presidential election, in an upset victory which awarded Bush the narrow margin by which he defeated Democrat Al Gore. Harless had undertaken a large fundraising effort to prevent Gore from winning, as he feared that his prominent environmentalist policies would destroy the coal industry and, in turn, West Virginia's coal-heavy economy. Harless had previously been influential in the elections of governors Cecil H. Underwood and Arch Moore in the 1980s and 1996, in some of only a few governors' elections since the Great Depression where West Virginia voters chose the Republican nominee.

== Early life and career ==
James Howard Harless was born in Taplin, West Virginia, on October 14, 1919, to Pearly J. Harless and Bessie, née Brown. His father worked in logging, and, at age 66, had already been married once with three children, before he married Harless' mother when she was around 17 years old. Following Harless' birth, his mother contracted pneumonia, and died aged 21, when Harless was four months old. Harless recalled that his father "felt he couldn't keep all three" of his children and remarried once again, bringing Harless' older brother with him to a farm in South Point, Ohio, while his sister was raised by a relative in Charleston, and Harless was adopted by one of his aunts. He was raised by the sister of his late mother, Rosa, and her husband, George Erastus Ellis. (Note: The Herald-Dispatch and the West Virginia Senate incorrectly spell George's last name as "Erastis." When asked to spell his last name out, Harless explicitly gives the name of his foster father as "Erastus.") George worked with timber rafting, however as a result of the Great Depression, he was unable to find work while Harless was in high school, and instead raised cows and pigs, later working as a carpenter until his retirement. They lived first in Mallory, in Logan County, but later moved to Gilbert, in Mingo County, when Harless was two years old. Harless attended Gilbert High School, from which he graduated in 1937. He had planned to later attend Marshall University in Huntington, and tried out unsuccessfully for a football scholarship at the school. He was not able to afford the cost of attending it.

He worked first at a local garage, and at a wrecker service, before working for several years at Red Jacket Coal Company, where he worked for his first six months with the cleaning of steel and machines, and keeping the production line free of falling slate. He worked then with dumping coal at a nearby mine for six months, before being transferred to the company's engineering department, where he stayed for a period of six years. (Note: In a sworn testimony before Congress in 1949, Harless claimed that he worked as a miner for the first two years of his employment at Red Jacket. This is inconsistent with aforementioned sources.) He saved up a sum of $500 while working at Red Jacket, and gave up mining in 1947, to become a part-owner and manager of a Gilbert saw-mill. He laid the foundation for Gilbert Lumber Company, with the help of what he later recalled as "$500 and a one-horse sawmill."

== Business career ==
=== International Industries ===
In 1947, Harless founded the Gilbert Lumber Company, where he produced mining equipment with the help of his sawmill. That same year, he also founded International Industries, which he grew over the years into a multimillion-dollar conglomerate. Harless served as president of Gilbert Lumber Company, until 1966, when he sold the company to Georgia-Pacific, who had offered to buy the company, as well as Harless' timber rights in the area, the previous year. As part of the contract signed with Georgia-Pacific, Harless was barred from conducting lumber business in the area for a period of 10 years, and instead chose to establish sawmills in South America at the advice of his son Larry. By the late 70s, he had set up sawmill operations in Brazil, Guatemala, Honduras and Ecuador. His sawmill operation in Brazil was located in the town of Abaetetuba, and its lumber was shipped via a vessel owned by Harless to a division of his company Gilbert Imported Hardwoods in Mobile, Alabama. He founded International Resources, a subsidiary of International Industries that operated in the coal industry, in 1966, and entered the mining industry that same year.

International Industries was Harless' primary business entity, and as of March 2008 it was made up of more than 15 different companies. Subsidiaries and associated companies of International Industries in the coal industry included Lynn Land Company, Jumacris Mining, Kitchekan Fuel, Hampden Coal and Chafin Branch Coal. International Industries also owned Benson International, which was the parent company of a number of subsidiaries in the trailer manufacturing and automotive industries, which also included service centers, dump body manufacturers and auto parts retailers. These included Benson Manufacturing, which was acquired in 1985 as Benson Truck Bodies, and International Trailers, which was founded by International Industries in 1990, as well as Worldwide Equipment. In 1986, Harless purchased Logan & Kanawha Coal Company, which was made a subsidiary of International Industries with sales agent and marketing roles. International Industries also owned a gun shop, and a weapons manufacturing company in South Korea. Guns imported by Harless from South Korea included the USAS-12, which was rejected by the Bureau of Alcohol, Tobacco, Firearms and Explosives on grounds of a "lack of a sporting purpose." It also had holdings in the hotel and real estate industries.

He sold the conglomerate in 2007. Its coal division was bought by the private-equity firm Lightfoot Capital Partners and renamed International Resource Partners, being officially acquired by the company on June 12. Harless remained as chairman of the company past its acquisition by Lightfoot Capital Partners, however, and is known to have served until at least 2011, at which point the company was sold again. He transferred the ownership of Gilco Lumber Company to businessman Everett Hannah in 2009.

=== Banking career ===
In 1973, Harless formed Gilbert Bank & Trust, which was the first bank in Gilbert since the bankruptcy of the previous one in 1929. Harless served as chairman of the bank starting that same year, and remained until 1987, at which point Gilbert Bank & Trust merged into the Matewan National Bank. Harless had been a director of Matewan since at least 1974, and remained as director following the merger. Harless was also chairman of the American National Bank of Logan in the 1980s, chairman of Guyan Bancshares, Inc. from 1984 to 1987, and a director of the National Bank of West Virginia in Morgantown. In 1984, he offered to buy the National Bank of Logan together with one his partners, for a price of $18 million.

=== Board memberships ===
In March 1968, Harless was named to the board of trustees of the non-profit healthcare system Appalachian Regional Hospitals, which provided healthcare services to medically indigent patients free of charge. Serving first until November 1972, he was reelected to the board in 1973, as well as 1975. He was elected chairman of the board in 1974, and is known to have served as chairman until at least 1976. Harless retired as chairman of Appalachian Regional Hospitals in 1977, however he continued to serve as a member of its board.

In 1977, Harless was elected to the board of directors of C&P Telephone. As of 1987, he was still serving as a director of the company. He also served on the advisory boards of Norfolk Southern Corporation and the West Virginia Center for Arts and Sciences.

In May 2001 he was appointed to the Massey Energy board of directors, (Note: According to the U.S. Securities and Exchange Commission, Harless began his service on April 27, 2001.) where he served as chairman of the Public and Environmental Policy Committee, and as a member of the Governance Committee. Originally elected to serve on the board until 2006, he announced his premature resignation in February 2005.

Harless was a member of the board of the West Virginia University Foundation for a total of 19 years, and served as chairman from 1982 to 1985. Prior to his chairmanship, Harless served as vice chairman of the board, where he is known to have been in office as of 1976, as well as 1981. He is known to have been a member of the board until at least 2004, and had also been appointed to the university's advisory board in 1979, where he served as member and chairman sometime before 1987. He was also a board member of Davis & Elkins College from 1985 to 1989, of the Concord College Foundation as of 1976, as well as a former chairman of the board of advisors of Marshall University. Having been appointed a member of the board in 1987, he was elected chairman in 1989, for the term 1989–1990. He served through 1990, as well as 1991, and was reelected again that same year. Serving until at least 1992, Harless was no longer serving as chairman of the board as of 1994, however he is known to have been a member of the board until at least October 1996. As chairman of the board of advisors, Harless headed the Presidential Search Committee in 1990, which led the search for a new president of the university, and took measures which included employing Heidrick & Struggles to assist in the process. He was also a member of the Marshall University Foundation, to which he was first appointed in 1979, and then reelected for a three-year term in 1981, as well as three years later in 1984. Having at some point left the board, Harless returned as a newly elected member in 1990, and is known to have served in 1997, as well as 2001. In 2004 he was described as a former member of the foundation.

== Political career ==
=== Early state politics (1950s–1970s) ===
In 1958, Harless is known to have served as chairman of West Virginia governor Cecil H. Underwood's Governor's Forest Fire Prevention Conference, where he served alongside future circuit judge Kenneth Keller Hall among others. Harless was also a member of the West Virginia Forest Industries Committee as of 1958, where he was known to have still been serving as of 1962, and was reappointed in 1967. He served on the board of the West Virginia Forest Council, to which he was reelected for a three-year term in 1959, and was also elected chairman of the Extension Service Committee of Mingo County in that year.

In the 1960s, Harless served two terms as mayor of his hometown of Gilbert. Starting in 1959, he was reelected to the office in 1961, and served until the June 1963 election, in which he was not a candidate for reelection. His brother Fred sought to succeed him as mayor, but was unsuccessful. Harless served as a member of the People's Party, of which he was also a former chairman. During his tenure, he oversaw the March 1963 flood that impacted the area, leading him to argue in favor of the Justice Reservoir before the House Committee on Appropriations of the United States Congress. Harless was the Republican nominee for court commissioner of Mingo County in 1968, and accused the state Democratic Party of engaging in vote buying in order to influence the upcoming elections, many victims of which were allegedly drunk, and called the situation "a plight upon all citizens of West Virginia, regardless of their political affiliation." In 1970, he supported Democrat Lafe Ward, who was a "close personal friend," in his campaign for the West Virginia Senate, together with Jay Rockefeller.

=== Later state politics (1980s–2010s) ===
Harless was a former member of the board of trustees of the University System of West Virginia. Having first been appointed by governor Gaston Caperton in June 1989, together with members such as tax commissioner David Hardesty and district court judge Robert Maxwell, he declined the appointment, in order to protest Caperton's handling of the ongoing coal wildcat strikes. At the same time, he also resigned from West Virginia Roundtable Inc., an economic development group he had helped form in 1984 together with Caperton and other business leaders. Harless was serving as its vice chairman and as a member of the board of directors, and cited the same reasons for his resignation as that of his resignation from the University System of West Virginia. The strikes were part of the strikes against Pittston Coal, and were initiated at Harless' operations following his refusal to sign a national contract signed by the United Mine Workers with the Bituminous Coal Operators Association. As a result, Harless non-union operation Hampden Coal Company was subject to repeated stone throwings and stormings of guardhouses, as well as damage to several vehicles at the operation. Harless expressed dissatisfaction with governor Caperton's and the state police's handling of the violent pickets that occurred, and stated that although he had initially hoped that Caperton would be "the best governor this state has ever had," he had written in his letter of resignation that he was "sorely disappointed" in his handling of the strikes. Harless eventually accepted another appointment to the state's university system board of directors, and took office on January 1, 1999.

In the 1980s, Harless was a major financial contributor to West Virginia governor Arch Moore, and served as chairman of Moore's Governor's Management Task Force II. He praised the governor for his plan to introduce a tax of 4 cents per hour worked that would be in place for a period of 5 years, in order to pay off the unemployment benefit debt owed by West Virginia to the federal government. Harless considered this a relief on the burden placed on employers, and argued that payroll taxes prevented the economic development of West Virginia. Following Moore's federal conviction however, a journalist noted that a mention of Harless' support of Moore was notably absent from a biography about his life.

During the 1996 gubernatorial election, he was an important backer of Republican candidate Cecil H. Underwood, whose upset victory was largely attributed to Harless' early support for him. In the 2004 gubernatorial election, Harless initially supported his childhood friend Dan Moore, who was seeking the Republican nomination. In the general election, however, Harless voiced his support for Democratic candidate Joe Manchin, and later also his Democratic successor Earl Ray Tomblin. Ahead of the 2006 U.S. senate election, Harless made financial contributions to Republican primary candidate Hiram Lewis, as well as Democratic incumbent Robert Byrd. He again supported Lewis in 2008, during his bid for Attorney General of West Virginia. In 2011, Harless was said to support Democrat Tish Chafin, the wife of state senator Truman Chafin, in her bid for a 12-year seat on the Supreme Court of Appeals of West Virginia in the 2012 election.

He was a financial contributor to West Virginia State Senate candidates, the West Virginia Republican Party, and politicians of both the Republican and Democratic parties.

=== Federal politics ===
Harless was a candidate for delegate to the 1956 Republican National Convention. Seeking to represent West Virginia's 5th congressional district, Harless positioned himself as a "real Eisenhower candidate," and as a supporter of Helen F. Holt and Chapman Revercomb, as well as vice president Richard Nixon. He was aligned with the faction of the state Republican Party opposed to the leadership of party boss Walter S. Hallanan, whom he blamed for the domination of the Democratic Party in the state since Hallanan became leader in 1928. In 1976, Harless donated $500 to the presidential campaign of Robert Byrd in his candidacy for the Democratic nomination.

Harless was an early supporter of the 2000 presidential campaign of George W. Bush and opponent of Democratic nominee Al Gore. Gore, who was known for his prominent environmental activism, was commonly referred to in West Virginia as an environmental extremist, and Harless feared that a Gore administration would put an end to mountaintop removal mining. He argued that Gore's policies would destroy West Virginia's coal-heavy economy. Leading up to the election, Harless served as finance chair of the George W. Bush campaign in West Virginia, and was credited by prominent Republicans Ken Mehlman and Karl Rove of helping Bush win the traditionally Democratic state of West Virginia. In an upset victory, that came to be described by The Wall Street Journal as a "political coup," Harless successfully helped break a long-standing tradition of Democratic victories in the state, and West Virginia's five electoral votes ultimately gave Bush the majority needed to win the election. The political fundraising campaign organized by Harless raised $275,000 for the Bush campaign, five times more than Al Gore collected statewide. His fundraising earned him the title of Bush Pioneer, and he was described by The New York Times as "the state's most prolific Republican fund-raiser."

Harless served as a presidential elector for the 2000 presidential election. He expressed dissatisfaction with the Electoral College system however, calling it a "terrible strain on the democracy," and claiming that a popular vote-based system would have prevented the controversy of Gore winning more votes than Bush while losing the Electoral College. Prior to the gathering of the Electoral College, supporters of Gore attempted to persuade Harless to change his electoral vote from Bush to Gore through thousands of emails, however these were instead sent to the admissions director of Marshall University, who also bore the name "James Harless," with the nearly 5,000 emails sent causing a network congestion in the university's computer system. In response to these efforts, Harless said that he would "absolutely not" change his vote to Gore, as he did not think Gore was "the best qualified man for the job, not the best for West Virginia. He is against coal. He is too much of an environmentalist for me." In the voting process of the Electoral College, Harless cast the 270th and deciding vote for Bush, ultimately giving him the majority needed to win the presidency. Harless and his fellow West Virginia electors later stated that they believed that Bush's win in West Virginia had been more important than that of Florida, since Gore's expected win in what was then "the safest Democratic state for a presidential candidate in the union" would have made the controversy of the contested Florida results inconsequential to the final outcome of the race.

In 2002, Harless was appointed by president Bush to the Board of Visitors of the United States Air Force Academy, where he served from 2002 to 2003. He also served on the Bush Transition Energy Advisory Team. In 2004, he served again as West Virginia finance chair of Bush's presidential campaign. He was a vocal opponent of Bush's Democratic challenger John Kerry, and described his liberal views as "contrary to what West Virginians believe."

Harless introduced Bush to the crowd at the West Virginia Coal Association annual meeting on July 31, 2008. In the speech given by Bush, he remarked that Harless "came down to the governor's mansion, came down just to take a sniff."

Ahead of the 2008 presidential election, Harless made financial contributions to Huck PAC, the political action committee of Mike Huckabee. (Note: Despite being founded by Huckabee, who was a candidate in the Republican primaries, the PAC officially endorsed John McCain for president of the United States, rather than Huckabee.) Starting in 2011, he also made political donations to Mitt Romney's campaign for president ahead of the 2012 election, which he furthered in 2012. Candidates for the United States House of Representatives who received contributions from Harless included John Boehner, Shelley Moore Capito, David McKinley, and Nick Rahall (D). Rahall, a "moderate" on the issue of surface mining, had defeated the incumbent U.S. Representative Ken Hechler, a prominent opponent of the coal industry, in the 1976 House election, and as a newly-elected congressman in 1977, at age 25, he had been a guest speaker when Harless was presented as "Coal Man of the Year" by the West Virginia Surface Mining and Reclamation Association.

== Beliefs and activism ==
=== Conservatism ===
Harless described himself as a conservative both politically and religiously, and was an opponent of many liberal views, including same-sex marriage and abortions. He was described at one point as "the town's only Republican," during the era of Democratic dominance in the area, but was also known to occasionally support "conservative Democrats like Manchin." The Bluefield Daily Telegraph described him as a "strong advocate of his faith," who disapproved of the "gradual turn [away] from God and prayer" that he observed of his nation. He expressed concern over efforts to remove the phrase "under God" from the Pledge of Allegiance of the United States, and questioned a decision by Concord University to replace the traditional prayer with meditation at its 2003 graduation ceremony. He claimed that welfare had "absolutely ruined the initiative of the people," and as chairman of Appalachian Regional Hospitals stated that while he believed in providing healthcare to patients "without regard to their ability to pay," the cost of providing free hospital care to those unable to pay had created an economic deficit for the firm that needed to be covered by new sources of revenue. He also criticized the term "free care," and said of it that "free care infers that the care is not only free to the patient, but also free to ARH," noting the expenses of the firm on payroll and medical supplies.

=== Localism ===
Harless was a proponent of keeping the lumber harvested in West Virginia contained within the state, in order to create jobs for the people of West Virginia, and suggested that the state improve its wood production industry in order to counter the outflow of lumber and subsequent job opportunities to other states. He was critical of plans to build a large pulp mill and more chip mills in the state, and said that value-adding industries such as furniture factories needed to be built instead. In 1961, Harless started a woodworking and furniture firm under the name National Seating and Dimension for the purpose of creating jobs in the area, however after three years of having observed none or only slight profits in the company, the plants were closed down, and Harless stated that despite its losses, he was confident it would have succeeded if skilled labor had been imported from the beginning, instead having attempted to sell job opportunities in a distressed labor area.

Described as having "worked tirelessly in support of higher education in West Virginia," Harless described liberal arts colleges as being just as important as engineering colleges, and sought to encourage younger generations of West Virginians to remain in the state, and to prevent talented students from emigrating elsewhere. He expressed dissatisfaction with changes for the worse made by political leaders in the state, and noted that he had seen several opportunities for advancement that had not been pursued, as leaders had "put self ahead."

Following the departure of West Virginia University president Gene Budig to another university of a similar size, Harless recognized that Budig had been offered "a much more attractive salary" for his transfer, and became an advocate for a policy that would allow private donations to supplement the salaries of university administrators in the state, in order to "attract and keep the type of leadership" that he described as necessary for institutions of higher education. He criticized the state funding of administrative salaries, and called on state officials to improve the salaries of public university staff, arguing that the existing salaries did not sufficiently prevent talented administrators from moving to states where they were able to earn more. As part of his initiative, Harless contributed $21,000 to the yearly salary of West Virginia University president E. Gordon Gee, first as an anonymous donor before later revealing his identity. His contribution faced criticism from employees at the university, however, who argued that the contribution of funds from an anonymous donor could be subject to a potential conflict of interest.

Harless was a supporter of several major infrastructure initiatives in southern West Virginia, including the Justice Dam, the Hatfield–McCoy Trails, a 225-acre housing development and shopping centre complex on a mountaintop outside his hometown, as well as the King Coal Highway. Described by Harless as a "four-lane super highway," Harless supported the construction of the highway to run along the U.S. 52 corridor, stretching from Bluefield to Logan, and said of the project that "the depressed coalfield towns along this antiquated highway will never be any better until they are made accessible to the outside world by a decent road." Harless had previously been a member of the board of West Virginians for Better Roads and Bridges, which campaigned for voter approval of the Better Highways Amendment of 1973, and was later also a member of the Interstate-66 Appalachian Corridor Team.

=== Environment ===
On a number of occasions, Harless criticized several statements and claims made by environmentalists. He was a prominent critic of Democratic presidential candidate Al Gore, and argued that his environmentalist policies would destroy West Virginia's coal industries. In 1994, he accused laws advocated by environmentalists of hindering the ability to mine coal in coal-dependent areas like McDowell County, however he also at the same time recognized the factor of depletion in coal mining, and advocated for preparing coal-heavy regions for "a future when the coal would be gone." Harless was voted "conservationist of the year" of West Virginia in 1958. In 1960, he encouraged the use of renewable resources such as water and timber in the state, and argued that the potential of West Virginia's wood industry was "beyond comprehension," because its resources had never been exploited, claiming that if they were, "[West Virginia] could put some 50,000 men to work immediately, because we have the finest hardwood that grows in the world." Regarding his views on environmental policies, Harless was described as having "a coal baron's talent for exploiting natural resources and an environmentalist's belief in making them sustainable," and said of himself that he believed in "protecting nature as much as you can, [but nature is] put here by our maker for our use." In regards to his role as a timber operator in Brazil, Harless claimed that environmentalists were "dead wrong" on the issue of exploitation of South American resources, and argued that the deforestation in the area was caused by the burning of land for farming, rather than by the forestry industry, and claimed that only "about four or five out of two hundred" wood species in the Amazon basin were economically merchantable.

Harless was a supporter of mountaintop removal mining, and praised the method of coal mining for the resulting flat surfaces that Harless described as beneficial to the mountainous landscape of West Virginia. He described the terrain of his home state as "unfortunate" and as having "no room on which to build housing," and in 1975 made plans to construct a large housing estate and shopping center on a local mountaintop with the help of mountaintop removal mining, noting also that the construction of the estate could not be afforded without extracting the coal in the mountain. His plans to transform the mountain were challenged by the Surface Mining Control and Reclamation Act of 1977, which regulates the usage of land that has been reclaimed from mine lands, and Harless criticized the Office of Surface Mining for requiring a capital commitment from a financial institution for his project, and accused the act of possibly forcing him to abandon his plans for the mountain. Harless' plans to combat the housing shortage in the area of his hometown were again challenged by federal law in 1979, when he constructed a 54-acre fill in the Guyandotte River for the purpose of making room for building lots, without having first acquired a permit required by the Clean Water Act.

=== Labor law ===
In 1981, Harless described independent coal operators as a "vanishing breed" because of the excessive government regulations and programs that he believed pained the coal industry. These included workmen's compensation, which he deemed to have unjustly settled a court case in favor the plaintiff, who had lost an arm in a mining accident at one of Harless' mines. Harless' attorneys argued that the plaintiff, who had operated a defective continuous miner, should never have operated the equipment at the site as he was a boss, and that he had not remained in the machine's driver's compartment throughout its operation. Following the court's decision to award the plaintiff and his wife a total of $4 million in damages, in what was described as "one of the largest settlements in Mingo County history," Harless criticized the compensation program for its inability to protect businesses from incautious employees, who he believed could wipe out small companies "overnight" at the fault of their own mistakes.

Although described as an "outspoken opponent of labor unions," Harless stated himself that he had "nothing against unions," and that his concerns with them mostly had to do with labor leaders, as well as work rules and productivity, rather than the wages of workers. In a 1964 incident however, Harless blamed recurring labor disputes for being the cause of the shutdown of a West Virginia woodworking factory of which he served as chairman. Harless said that these had chased away many prominent management staffers, which along with failed attempts to resolve the disputes had led to the plant's shutdown. Harless attributed the frequent labor disputes to demands for higher wages made by trade unions, and argued that the plant would have been better off had it not invested in the retraining of unemployed coal miners. In a hearing before Congress in 1949, Harless criticized the monopoly of the United Mine Workers and its president John L. Lewis, and was especially critical of Lewis' decision to impose a 3-day workweek on the coal industry. Harless claimed that this policy had increased production costs, lowered demands for goods, and caused uncertainty in the coal market, adding also that the monopoly of UMW disallowed coal operators from setting their own work hours and wages, and that powerful unions had "killed" the competitive spirit of the individual worker. Shortly before the "inevitable" Bituminous coal strike of 1977–78, Harless took part in preventive talks to settle contract negotiations with the BCOA, and said of labor unions that "I have always been an independent cuss. I didn't like having someone else tell me what I had to do all the time. I think the BCOA has made a lot of trouble and mistakes over the years. I didn't want to have to be a party to any more they made." In 1983, Harless withdrew from BCOA, following disagreements with a contract that had been negotiated by UMW chairman Richard Trumka and the chairman of Consolidation Coal Company. He regarded the contract as giving too much power to unions, and believed it to have been designed in order to put smaller unionized coal operations like his own out of business. Harless had previously been a member of UMW in his youth, and had agreed to contracts negotiated by UMW and BCOA since he first entered the mining industry in 1966.

== Philanthropy ==
Harless was widely known for his philanthropic efforts, which included donations to charities for many causes in Mingo County and its surrounding areas. Described as having his name be "synonymous with philanthropy in West Virginia," Harless made contributions to needy individuals, churches and schools, including giving "generously" to Marshall University and West Virginia University, as well as to rural healthcare, education programs and the Boy Scouts of America, of which he had himself been a former member. Harless allowed many students to achieve higher levels of education, by means of either paying for their tuitions or by creating scholarships which they could be awarded. These included scholarships at the West Virginia University College of Law, at the West Virginia School of Osteopathic Medicine, at Davis & Elkins College, and at Concord University. Described by Marshall University president Dale F. Nitzschke as having been "a remarkable benefactor to higher education in West Virginia" since the 1950s, Harless largest contributions to educational institutions included a $1.5 million donation to the West Virginia University Foundation in 1991, for "an innovative program to induce [locals] to stay in school and attend college," a $1 million donation to the West Virginia University College of Law in 2012, for its renovation and the establishment of an educational courtroom, as well $1 million to Marshall University in 1990, $750,000 of which would fund local scholarships and $250,000 of which would go to the Society of Yeager Scholars. Harless was notably said to have been one of the first contributors to the Society of Yeager Scholars. At the account of a documentary filmer, Harless once said that he had even taken out a loan to make a charitable contribution.

Following the death of his son, Harless recalled him saying that there had been nothing to do in their small community, and that he had always wanted a place where children in the town could play. After his death in 1995, Harless contributed the cost of constructing a 55,000-square-foot community center in Gilbert, which was named the Larry Joe Harless Community Center in his honor. Inside the community center would be a pool, movie theaters, a cafeteria, computer rooms, meeting areas, and courts for tennis, racquetball and basketball, as well as several activities and classes. The community center also hosts a clinic, which was started through a friendship Harless had with two physicians of West Virginia University, in order to combat the inability to access healthcare in the area, as local citizens previously needed to travel to Huntington, Charleston, Morgantown or out of state to access specialty care.

== Awards and recognitions ==
During his career, Harless received several awards for his work. These included being named West Virginian of the Year by the Charleston Gazette-Mail in 1983, being inducted into the West Virginia Coal Hall of Fame in 1998, and the West Virginia Business Hall of Fame in 2001, being named Coal Man of the Year of 1976 by the West Virginia Mining and Reclamation Association, and selected as West Virginia's "Outstanding Volunteer Fund Raiser of the Year" at the 1988 National Philanthropy Day, as well as being awarded "West Virginia Son of the Year" by the West Virginia Society of Washington, D.C. He received honorary doctoral degrees from West Virginia University, Marshall University, Stillman College, Pikeville College, University of Charleston and Concord University.

== Personal life ==
Harless became a member of the Presbyterian Church of Gilbert as an adult, when he was baptized in 1955, becoming a "muscular Christian." Harless' conversion has been commonly described as a crucial turning point in his life, including by Harless, who claimed it to be the point when he achieved his "greatest success" in life, by the West Virginia Senate, who referred to the day of his conversion as having begun with Harless "feeling utterly alone and lost," but ended in "tranquility and a sense of redemption," and by biographers, who recall him being given "a vision of God and stewardship[,] and…mental calipers to measure his life in modalities other than the world's." Harless held several religious posts during his life, including serving as an elder of his church, as president of the Men of the Bluestone Presbytery, as president of West Virginia Presbyterians' Bluestone Conference Center, as moderator of the Greenbrier Presbytery, as a clergy representative to the 1976 Synod of the Virginias, and as a board member of the West Virginia Fellowship of Christian Athletes. He also successfully helped promote the study of evangelism at Union Presbyterian Seminary in Richmond, Virginia. His mother and her family, who lived at the Huff Creek, had been Methodists.

Harless married his wife June Montgomery in February 1939. Both attendees of Gilbert High, the two had dated during their time in high school, and were commonly described as being each others' "high school sweetheart." June managed the fiscal side of Harless' Gilbert Lumber Company early in his career, which was described by the Bluefield Daily Telegraph as having been "a key part of the success of Mr. Harless' companies." After 60 years of marriage, June died on April 27, 1999, and was posthumously praised by West Virginia governor Cecil H. Underwood, as a "dear and special friend" of him and his wife Hovah. Harless remarried to Hallie Lois Chapman in 2001.

Harless was described by U.S. senator Joe Manchin as a "dear personal friend," and was said to have had a "tight bond" with businessman James Justice Sr., the father of future West Virginia governor Jim Justice. His 92nd birthday was attended by guests including Robert H. Foglesong, whom Harless had previously accompanied to the Ramstein Air Base in Germany.

Harless was a half-brother of Pearly J. "Bud" Harless, Jr. His brother Fred, who was himself also a former coal operator, died in a plane crash in 1981, when his Beechcraft Baron plane collided with the guy-wire of an antenna tower.

== Death and legacy ==
On Christmas Eve of 2013, Harless health began to suddenly weaken, and Harless died, following a brief illness, on January 1, 2014, at his home in Gilbert, West Virginia, aged 94. His death was acknowledged by West Virginia senators Jay Rockefeller and Joe Manchin, governor Earl Ray Tomblin and attorney general Patrick Morrisey, as well as representative Nick Rahall, state senator Truman Chafin and the state Republican Party. Statements were also issued by university presidents Stephen J. Kopp, of Marshall University, and E. Gordon Gee, of West Virginia University. Representative Shelley Moore Capito, secretary of state Natalie Tennant and America's Got Talent winner Landau Eugene Murphy Jr. spoke of Harless' death via the website Twitter.

Harless' legacy includes many buildings and institutions around West Virginia which bear his name, including several with no relation to the coal industry. Among these are the Larry Joe Harless Community Center, named after his son, and the Harless Stadium at Mingo Central Comprehensive High School, the Buck Harless Bridge and Larry Joe Harless Drive in Gilbert, and several buildings at Marshall University, in honor of his philanthropic efforts there, including the June Harless Center for Rural Educational Research and Development, the Buck Harless Student-Athlete Academic Center, the Harless Dining Hall and the Harless Auditorium, as well as West Virginia University's Buck Harless Bridge Builder Legacy Award, named in part after Harless favorite poem, "The Bridge Builder." He also gave his name to an industrial park in Holden, which formerly hosted a hardwood flooring plant owned by Mohawk Industries.

== See also ==
- 1996 West Virginia gubernatorial election
- 2000 United States presidential election in West Virginia
- Mountaintop removal mining

== Bibliography ==
- Ruel E. Foster; Robert B. Conner (1992). Buck: A Life Sketch of James H. Harless. West Virginia University Press. p. 166. ISBN 978-0-937058-30-5.
- Brisbin, Richard A. (2008). West Virginia Politics and Government. University of Nebraska Press. ISBN 978-0803219366.
- Abernathy, Gary (2005). Elephant Wars: Why Fight the Democrats when We Have Each Other?. iUniverse. ISBN 9780595358878.
- Martin, Richard (2015). Coal Wars: The Future of Energy and the Fate of the Planet. St. Martin's Publishing Group. ISBN 9781466879249.
- Quarterly Journal, Volume 7. Office of the Comptroller of the Currency. 1988.
- Pauley, Bob (2017). Pizzazz!: Mastermind – for your Financial Freedom. Xlibris. ISBN 9781543458145.
- Federal Highway Administration (2003). Appalachian Corridor I-66 from US 23 in Pike County Kentucky to the King Coal Highway in Mingo County West Virginia.
- Elwood L. White (2006). The United States Air Force Academy: A Bibliography, 2001–2005. USAF Academy Library.

=== Congressional hearings ===
- United States Senate Committee on Banking and Currency (1949). Economic Power of Labor Organizations. U.S. Government Publishing Office.
- United States House Committee on Appropriations (1964). Hearings, volume 12. U.S. Government Publishing Office.
- United States Senate Committee on Energy and Natural Resources (1979). Oversight--the Surface Mining Control and Reclamation Act of 1977. U.S. Government Printing Office.

Business positions
New office	Chairman of International Industries; 1947–2011	Succeeded by James River Coal
Political offices
Unknown	Mayor of Gilbert, West Virginia; 1959–1963	Succeeded by Pierce Fox
Party political offices
Unknown	Chairman of the People's Party fl. 1951	Unknown
Awards and achievements
Preceded by Arthur Recht	West Virginian of the Year; 1983	Succeeded by Mary Lou Retton
