= Gilbert Creek =

Gilbert Creek may refer to:

- Gilbert Creek, West Virginia, an unincorporated community and census-designated place
- Gilbert Creek (West Virginia), a stream
