= Keith Perry =

Keith Perry may refer to:

- Keith Perry (singer), American country music and Christian music artist
- Keith Perry (politician) (born 1958), Republican member of the Florida Senate
