= Gilbert, West Virginia =

- Town
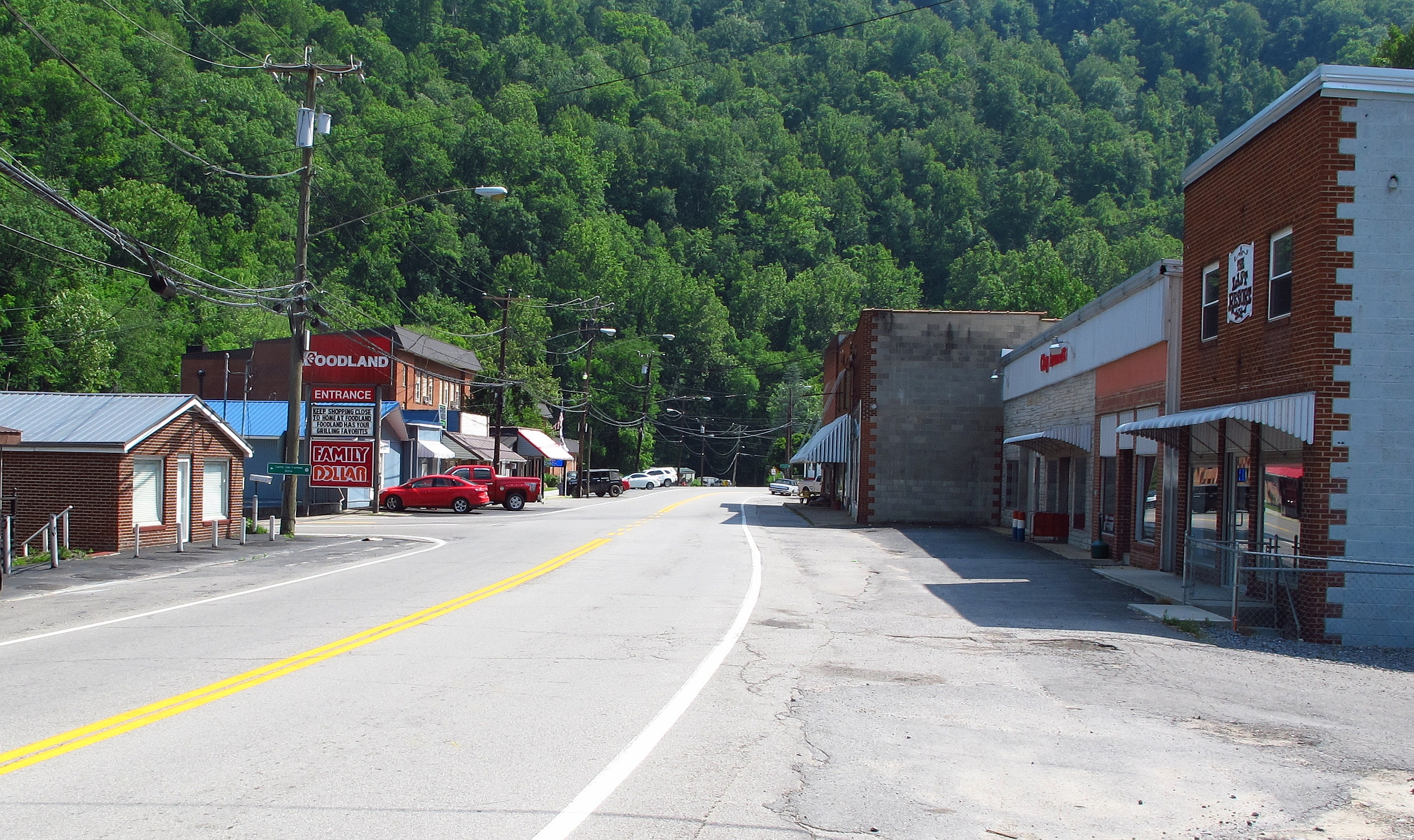
- Central Avenue in Gilbert

- Flag Seal Logo
- Motto: You should see the hills from here!
- Location of Gilbert in Mingo County, West Virginia.
- Coordinates: 37°36′52″N 81°52′2″W
- Country: United States
- State: West Virginia
- County: Mingo

Government
  - Mayor: Michael Fox
  - Recorder: Kyle Surber
  - Council: Valerie Bradford, Brandon Cline, Missy Birchfield, Quinn Miller, Michael Mounts

Area
  - Total: 1.04 sq mi (2.70 km^{2})
  - Land: 1.00 sq mi (2.58 km^{2})
  - Water: 0.046 sq mi (0.12 km^{2})
- Elevation: 840 ft (256 m)

Population (2020)
  - Estimate: 333
- Demonym: Gilbertonian
- Time zone: UTC-5 (Eastern (EST))
  - Summer (DST): UTC-4 (EDT)
- ZIP code: 25621
- Area codes: 304 & 681
- FIPS code: 54-30772
- GNIS feature ID: 1539390
- Website: https://www.gilbertwv.com/

Gilbert is a town in Mingo County, West Virginia, United States, along the Guyandotte River. The population was 333 at the 2020 census. Gilbert was incorporated in 1918 and named for Gilbert Creek, which derives its name from the name of an early traveler in the area who was killed by Native Americans. Gilbert is known nationwide for the Hatfield-McCoy ATV Trails that are located in the area. There are a number of lodges and restaurants in Gilbert.

On July 1, 2023, after a months-long design contest, the town announced its new flag, "The Star of Bright Promise."

== Geography ==
According to the United States Census Bureau, the town has a total area of 1.04 square miles (2.69 km^{2}), of which 0.99 square miles (2.56 km^{2}) is land and 0.05 square miles (0.13 km^{2}) is water.

== Demographics ==
Historical population
Census	Pop.	Note	%±
1930	451		—
1940	490		8.6%
1950	722		47.3%
1960	874		21.1%
1970	778		−11.0%
1980	757		−2.7%
1990	456		−39.8%
2000	417		−8.6%
2010	450		7.9%
2020	333		−26.0%
U.S. Decennial Census

=== 2010 census ===
At the 2010 census there were 450 people, 212 households, and 137 families living in the town. The population density was 454.5 inhabitants per square mile (175.5/km^{2}). There were 262 housing units at an average density of 264.6 units per square mile (102.2 units/km^{2}). The racial makeup of the town was 99.1% White, 0.2% Asian, and 0.7% from two or more races. Of the 212 households, 21.2% had children under the age of 18 living with them, 51.9% were married couples living together, 10.4% had a female householder with no husband present, 2.4% had a male householder with no wife present, and 35.4% were non-families. 32.1% of households were one person and 17.4% were one person aged 65 or older. The average household size was 2.12 and the average family size was 2.64.

The median age in the town was 49.7 years. 15.3% of residents were under the age of 18; 8.2% were between the ages of 18 and 24; 18.6% were from 25 to 44; 36% were from 45 to 64, and 21.8% were 65 or older. The gender makeup of the town was 45.1% male and 54.9% female.

=== 2000 census ===
At the 2000 census there were 417 people, 187 households, and 120 families living in the town. The population density was 407.6 inhabitants per square mile (157.4 inhabitants/km^{2}). There were 227 housing units at an average density of 221.9 units per square mile (85.7 units/km^{2}). The racial makeup of the town was 97.84% White, 0.96% Asian, and 1.20% from two or more races. Of the 187 households 27.8% had children under the age of 18 living with them, 50.3% were married couples living together, 10.7% had a female householder with no husband present, and 35.8% were non-families. 31.6% of households were one person and 15.5% were one person aged 65 or older. The average household size was 2.23 and the average family size was 2.82.

The age distribution was 20.9% under the age of 18, 6.7% from 18 to 24, 28.5% from 25 to 44, 27.1% from 45 to 64, and 16.8% 65 or older. The median age was 43 years. For every 100 females, there were 98.6 males. For every 100 females age 18 and over, there were 90.8 males.

The median household income was $29,219 and the median family income was $32,250. Males had a median income of $38,750 versus $25,938 for females. The per capita income for the town was $20,219. About 11.7% of families and 15.5% of the population were below the poverty line, including 16.7% of those under age 18 and 16.9% of those age 65 or over.

== Notable people ==
- Keith Perry, country music artist
- Bud Harless, racing driver
- James H. "Buck" Harless, coal baron
- Arden Mounts, NASCAR Pontiac and Hudson racer, 1953–1956
- Garin Justice, college football coach
