= Ruthie Collins =

American singer-songwriter (born 1984)

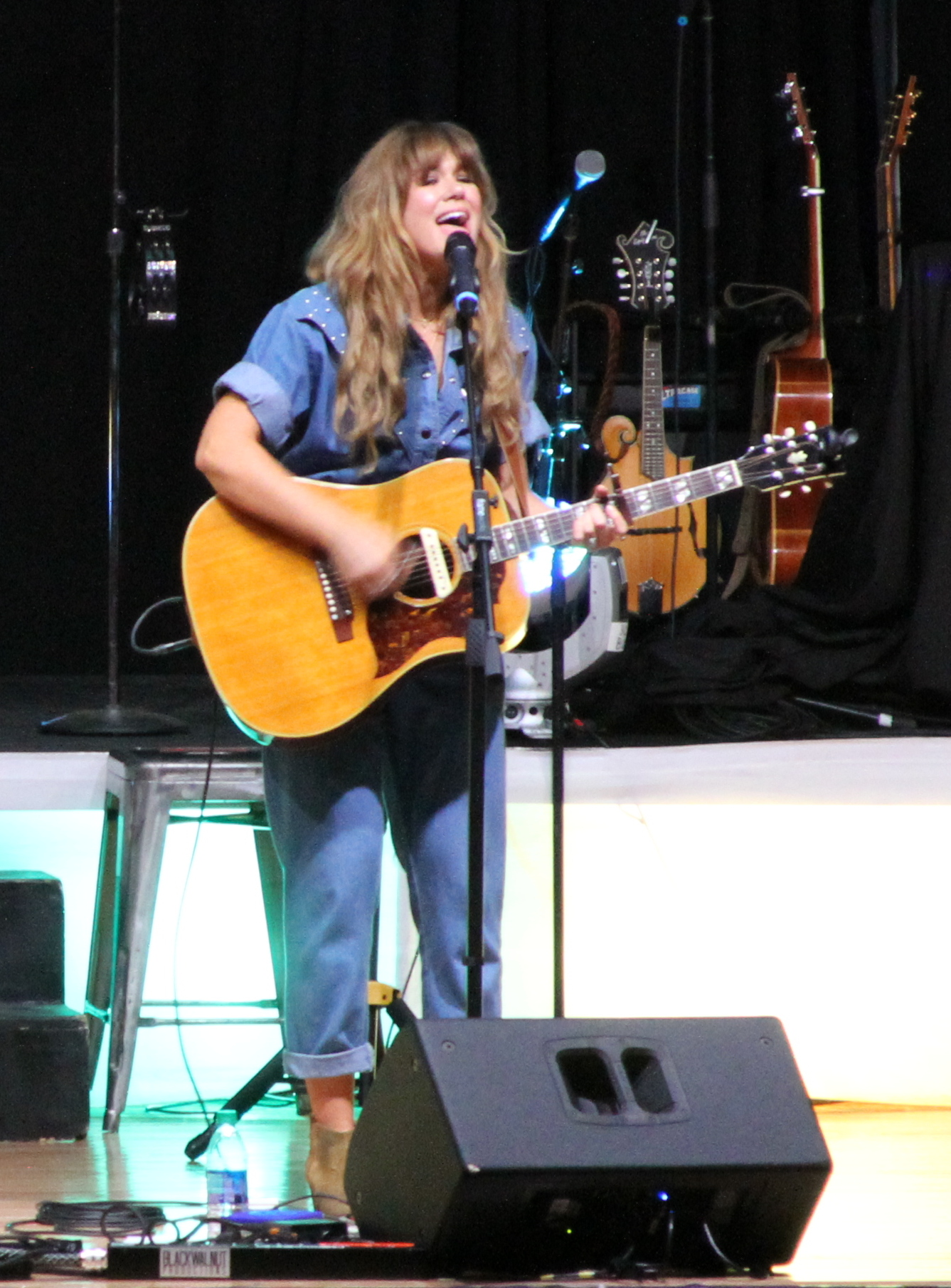
- Maddie & Tae concert, Aug. 8, 2019

Background information
- Born: Ruth Antoinette Collins; March 10, 1984 (age 42); Fredonia, New York
- Genres: Country music; Americana
- Occupation: Singer-songwriter
- Instruments: Voice; Guitar; Piano
- Years active: 2007-present
- Label: Curb Records
- Website: ruthiecollinsmusic.com

Ruthie Collins is an American singer/songwriter and recording artist based in Nashville, Tennessee. Her solo career launched in 2014 with the release of her debut self-titled EP, and she has released two full-length albums since then. Collins also co-hosted the show Home.Made. on A&E and appeared on The Bachelor Winter Games on ABC. Music by Collins has been featured in shows such as Netflix's The Ranch and video games such as Madden NFL 19.

== Early life ==
Collins grew up on a grape farm in Fredonia, New York. She was raised on gospel music through her church, and she learned about classical music from her mother, a pianist and organist. She attended Berklee College of Music.

== Career ==
In 2007, Collins formed the country duo Wild Honey with Victoria Gibson, and the two competed in the reality-competition show Can You Duet on CMT. Collins went on to pursue a solo career, signing with Curb Records in 2011. The label also featured her on two singles put out by the band Sweetwater Rain, although she was not considered an official member of the band.

She released her debut self-titled EP in 2014. Her first full-length album Get Drunk and Cry was released in 2016 along with a short film. She released her album Cold Comfort on April 3, 2020, and toured to support the album in 2021. The expanded version of her most recent album, Cold Comfort +, was released on January 7, 2022.

== Discography ==
=== Albums ===
- Ruthie Collins EP (2014)
- Get Drunk and Cry (2017)
- Jam in the Van - Ruthie Collins (Live Session, Nashville, TN, 2019) (2020)
- Cold Comfort (2020)
- Cold Comfort + (2022)

=== Singles ===
- "Ramblin' Man" (2014)
- "Dear Dolly" (2016)
- "Get Drunk and Cry" (2017)
- "Finally Here (Single from Longshot: Homecoming Original Soundtrack)" (2018)
- "Joshua Tree" (2019)
- "Dang Dallas" (2019)
- "Cold Comfort" (2020)
- "Bad Woman" (2020)
- "Hypocrite" (2021)
- "Dear Santa" (2021)

== See also ==
- List of people from Tennessee
- List of singer-songwriters
