= Norwegian State Council on Disability =

Norwegian government agency

Norwegian State Council on Disability (Norwegian: Statens råd for funksjonshemmede) is a Norwegian government agency responsible for giving advice on matters within discrimination of people with disabilities, including issues related to public accessibility. The council has fourteen members, elected for four years, and acts as an advisory board, primarily related to other public agencies. It was created in 1991.
