= Earling =

Earling may refer to:

- Earling, Iowa, United States
- Earling, West Virginia, United States
- Debra Magpie Earling (born 1957), Native American author
- The Earling, a ceremony to invest a new Earl in the novel Titus Groan by Mervyn Peake

== See also ==
- Erlang (programming language)
- Earlington (disambiguation)
