= Trini (disambiguation) =

Trini is a term for Trinidadians and Tobagonians.

Trini may also refer to:

== People ==
=== Given name ===
- Trini Alonso (1923–2000), Spanish film actress
- Trini Alvarado (born 1967), American actress
- Trini de Figueroa (1918-1972), Spanish romance novelist
- Trini Lopez (1937–2020), American singer, guitarist, and actor
- Trini Montero (1927–2012), Spanish film actress
- Trini E. Ross (born 1966), American lawyer
- Trini Tinturé (born 1935), Spanish cartoonist and illustrator
- Trini Triggs (born 1965), American country music singer

=== Surname ===
- Jade Trini Goring, American singer
- Mari Trini (1947–2009), Spanish pop singer and actress born Maria Trinidad Perez Miravete
- Matteo Trini (born 1987), Italian footballer

== Fictional characters ==
- Trini Kwan, the Yellow Power Ranger from Mighty Morphin Power Rangers
- Trini, either of two dolls in the Groovy Girls doll line by Manhattan Toy
- Trini Mumford, a character from Molly of Denali
