= Pittston Coal strike =

American strike action, 1989–1990

Pittston Coal Miners' Strike
- Date: April 5, 1989 – February 20, 1990
- Location: Primary locations: Clinchfield Moss Mine, Wise County, Virginia 37°6′39″N 82°31′30″W 1,962 feet (598 m); Moss 3 Mine, Dickenson County, Virginia 37°3′50″N 82°10′7″W 1,631 feet (497 m); Moss 3 Preparation Plant, Russell County, Virginia. 36°57′25″N 82°10′53″W 1,555 feet (474 m)
- Also known as: Pittston Strike of 1989
- Participants: UMWA, Pittston Coal Company, and Nonunion members
- Outcome: Health and retirement benefits reinstated to miners. UMWA fined $64 million. Pittston Company lost 2/3 of production.

The Pittston Coal strike was a United States strike action led by the United Mine Workers Union (UMWA) against the Pittston Coal Company, nationally headquartered in Pittston, Pennsylvania. The strike, which lasted from April 5, 1989 to February 20, 1990, resulted from Pittston's termination of health care benefits for approximately 1,500 retirees, widows, and disabled miners. The strikers also cited the refusal of the company to contribute to the benefit trust established in 1950 for miners who retired before 1974 and the refusal of the company to bargain in good faith as grounds for their action. The company cited declining coal prices, decreasing demand, and recession as its reason for limiting health care benefits.

The strike affected production in mines mostly in Virginia, but a few in West Virginia and Kentucky as well. Mine workers and their families engaged in acts of civil disobedience, work stoppage, protests, and rallies. At its peak in June 1989, the strike involved approximately 2,000 miners daily staying at Camp Solidarity with thousands more sending donations and holding wildcat walkouts that involved around 40,000 people. The participation of women in the labor action through the ad hoc formation of the Daughters of Mother Jones—reminiscent of the early days of union organization—proved an essential element of the successful strike.

== Background ==
During the 1980s, the price, adjusted for inflation, of coal declined, which put economic pressure on coal companies. Many of them began employing non-union workers, who would work for less money, to be able to maintain a profit.

By 1987, Pittston Coal had dropped from being the 7th-largest coal operator in the United States to the 15th, and coal production was at an all-time low. The Pittston Coal Company had worked with the Bituminous Coal Operators (BCOA), which regulated health and retirement benefits offered to Pittston workers. The Pittston mines continued to lose money, however, and in 1987, the Pittston Coal Company terminated its contract with the BCOA to establish its own health and retirement benefit contract with the UMWA. Through collective bargaining, the UMWA and the Pittston Coal Company established two different retirement plans for the miners: one for those who retired before 1974 and one for those who retired after 1974 in the hopes that would help the company gain a profit.

In 1988, Pittston still felt the strain of providing benefits, with the cost per miner increasing by $3,746 from the 1979 amount. The company was still going into debt and having a difficult time paying for the miners' benefits. To avoid losing more money, Pittston doubled health deductibles, lowered the coverage from 100% to 80%, and discontinued benefits to miners who retired before 1974. That change in the health care plan was still not enough for the company to gain a profit and so it decided to keep the mines running 24 hours a day and seven days a week, with no overtime for the workers. Pittston also did away with successorship clauses, which meant that the miners of Pittston would not have job security or transfer of job rights in mines that were leased or sold.

Miners were now working longer hours with more expensive health care plans, and the mine was losing no production time because it was never closed.

The UMWA took action against Pittston's new plan of operation and offered to reach a settlement. The coal company stayed quiet, and when the time came to renew the health care and retirement benefit plans for its workers, Pittston refused. The refusal to renew the contract left about 1,500 people without health care. The people were not just miners employed by Pittston but also families, widows, and disabled miners in the Virginia area.

== UMWA declares strike ==
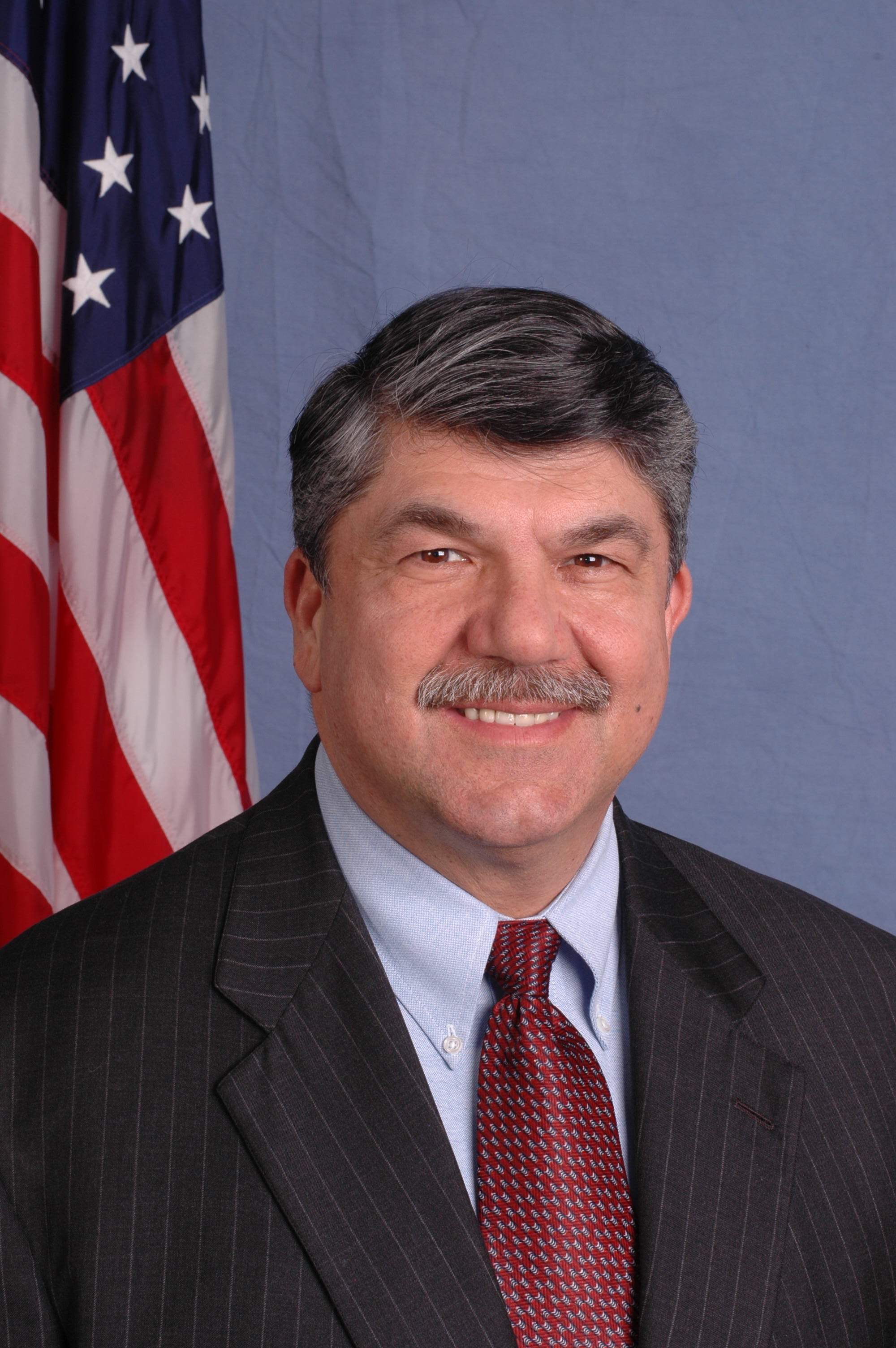
President of the UMWA during the Pittston strike, Richard Trumka.

In April 1989, after the miners had worked 14 months without benefits, UMWA President Richard Trumka declared a strike against the Pittston Coal Company. Around 2,000 UMWA members who worked for Pittston walked out of the mines and reported to the picket line. Pittston responded to the strike by hiring replacement workers. To ensure that production would continue, Pittston also had help from the state police to escort the replacement miners and coal trucks across the picket line.

The UMWA used civil disobedience to attract attention to the needs of the miners. The union stressed that all actions of the strike had to remain peaceful. However, many miners still used violent methods during the strike. The strike gained the news media's attention. People came from all across the country to support the UMWA's cause, and around 50,000 people went to southwestern Virginia during the course of the strike.

During the strike, Pittston's production was reduced by about a third. Low production could have been a result of the strike taking place in several mines owned by Pittston. The main mine involved was the Clinchfield Coal Company in Dickenson County, Virginia. Some of the other mines that participated in the strike of 1989 were the Moss 3 Preparation Plant in Russell County, Virginia, McClure Mine, and the Westmoreland Coal Complex. Pittston refused to give in to the UMWA's demands although it operated at a loss, and the strike continued. Unable to meet the financial needs of the strikers, the UMWA started to suffer as well. As the strike progressed, members of the union were paid less than $210 a week on average, less than a third of the average salary of $640 a week.

Although the union members were getting less pay than promised, they did not lose their faith in the UMWA's ability to negotiate a settlement. Trumka's efforts made the miners keep their spirit and morale during the strike. He knew that giving into the demands of Pittston would lead to other mine companies revoking health care benefits. On August 20, 1989 Trumka was questioned by B. Drummond Ayers Jr., a local reporter from the New York Times, about how long he expected the strike to continue. Trumka responded to the question by saying, "People keep asking how long we can hold out. The answer: one day longer than Pittston."

The strike continued until February 1990, when a settlement was agreed upon by both parties. The settlement was reached after taking the demands to court several times and after many ratifications were made. The miners of the Pittston Coal Company once again received health and retirement benefits.

== Tactics ==
During the Pittston strike, the UMWA wanted to use only nonviolent means of protest against the company. Many union members practiced that method of civil disobedience and found creative ways for their message to be heard such as mass sit down strike and road blockades. However, many wildcat strikers ignored the request of the UMWA and used violence to express the anger that they felt toward the Pittston Coal Company. When the strike ended, over 4,000 people had been arrested for their actions.

=== Violent actions ===
Most of the people who carried out violent acts were nonunion members and wildcat strikers. Actions included destruction of the Pittston Company's mining equipment; pelting coal trucks with rocks to break their windows; and stopping the trucks by slashing their tires usually by using Jack rocks, which were sharp tools made up of nails welded together with their points facing out designed to puncture the tires. Wildcat strikers also began to organize walkouts, which were illegal for UMWA members, but since the wildcats were not affiliated with a union, they continued to organize walkouts throughout Virginia. By June 1989, nearly 37,000 wildcat strikers had become involved with the Pittston strike.

The strike acts soon spread past Virginia and into other parts of the country and other coal companies. Additional violent acts included the making of car bombs that were placed along roadsides that coal trucks would travel. Shotguns were used to shoot employees at the Hampden Coal Company when they tried to enter the coal mines. Some strikers shot into the windows of cars and houses of the replacement miners and Pittston Coal Company owners. There were many different violent strike tactics carried out and although many people were injured, including one striker shot, there were no deaths associated with the strike.

=== Civil disobedience ===
The UMWA tried to focus the strikers on civil disobedience and often stepped in to stop the wildcat strikers. The union members used many different nonviolent strike tactics. The acts included standing and blocking the roads that the coal trucks would travel, mass sit-down strikes, and large groups of people picketing outside of the Pittston coal mines. Those methods of protesting helped the UMWA gain support from other people around the country.

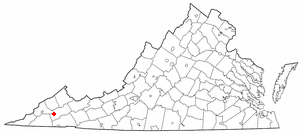
Castlewood, Virginia, marked by this map, was the location of Camp Solidarity. The main mines involved were located close to that area.

Another method of peaceful protesting was demonstrated in the formation of Camp Solidarity, which was in the center of the protesting, in southern Virginia. Supporters came from all over the country to show their outrage against the actions of Pittston, but there was no place that they could stay. Although many people in the local towns would offer shelter, they could not provide enough beds and food for all of the people who came. Union member supporters found a solution to the problem. A local recreational park near Castlewood, Virginia, was turned into a campground where those supporters could stay. A small shelter equipped with bunk beds was built and an already-existing snack bar was opened to provide food for the people staying at Camp Solidarity. Because the location was a recreational park, there was plenty of space for others to bring campers and tents into the area.

As a result of the protests, more than $30 million in fines were levied against the UMWA by Russell County Circuit Court Judge Donald A. McGlothlin Jr. In what many saw as an act of retaliation, the miner and union official Jackie Stump was recruited to mount a write-in campaign for the state legislature against McGlothlin's father, Delegate Don McGlothlin. Stump, who was cellmates with UMWA Vice President Cecil Roberts during the strike, went on to win the November election by more than two to one.

==== Moss 3 ====
The most important act of civil disobedience during the Pittston strike was Moss 3. Since the strike had been going on for a few months, with no settlement expected in the near future, union members began to lose hope. Thousands of people had already been arrested, and a lot of money had been spent on a cause that seemed to be never ending. Union members knew that something had to be done to regain the spirit of the strike and to make it clear to Pittston that they would not give up.

The plan that the Union officers devised was called Moss 3, named after the Pittston's Moss 3 Preparation Plant, which was then its primary coal processing plant. The officials were very secretive about planning that act of nonviolent strike. They wanted Pittston to know nothing about what was about to take place. Officials selected 99 union members out of Virginia, West Virginia, and Kentucky to participate in Moss 3 and the selected miners met in Virginia and were told about the plan.

Moss 3 was set up to be an unexpected mass nonviolent sit-down strike within the preparation plant. The 99 strikers walked into the plant peacefully and sat down inside the plant to halt production. Meanwhile, thousands of other supporters gathered outside the plant to encourage the strikers inside. An estimated 5,000 supporters at the height of Moss 3 were gathered outside the production plant.

The sit-down strike inside Moss 3 lasted from Sunday to Wednesday. After four days, the strikers felt they made their point to Pittston and walked out. Local miners said that Pittston had called in the National Guard and state police to remove the miners if they did not leave within an hour. The Pittston owners felt that the miners inside had been tipped off to that information and that they had left to avoid being arrested.

== Women's involvement ==
Although the Pittston strike involved coal miners, many of the supporters of the strike were not miners. Most of the support that the union members received was from women. Many of the women were wives or daughters of miners who worked for Pittston, but some had no affiliation with Pittston Coal Company or mining. Some women sat down in the middle of roads and caused causing blockages, and others would drive slowly in front of coal trucks to cause delays. Two groups of women supporters arose during that time: "The Daughters of Mother Jones" and "The Freedom Fighters." At the peak of the strike, around 500 women were involved in supporting the miners, most of them housewives.

=== Daughters of Mother Jones ===
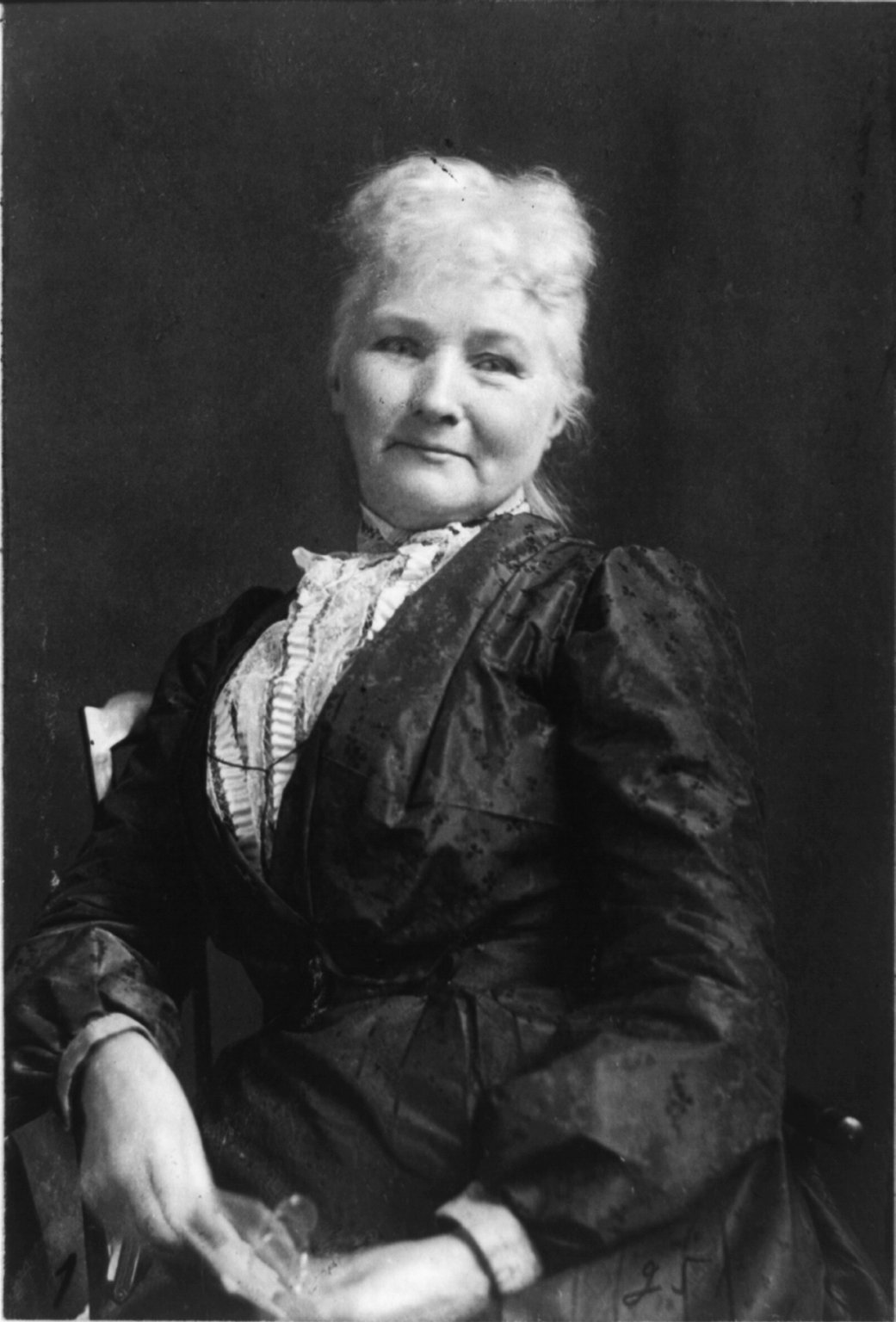
The "Daughters of Mother Jones" named themselves after the union activist Mary Harris "Mother" Jones.

One group of women that formed during the strike were the "Daughters of Mother Jones." The group took their name from Mary Harris Jones, also known as "Mother Jones," a famous mine union activist, in support of the miners. The Daughters provided similar support as other women supporters during the strike, including organizing housing, preparing food, and raising money for the miners.

The Daughters of Mother Jones also conducted a regular protest outside of the Pittston Coal State Headquarters in Lebanon, Virginia, coordinated with UMWA leadership. They picketed outside every Monday and Wednesday outside of the Pittston company headquarters to gain media attention and support for the miners. On April 18, 1989, a group of 39 women went into the Pittston Coal headquarters and held a 36-hour sitdown protest, which shut down coal production for one-and-a-half days. They refused to individually identify themselves to the company management and instead referred to themselves as the Daughters of Mother Jones. They left voluntarily after 36 hours.

=== Freedom Fighters ===
Another women's group that developed during the strike was the Freedom Fighters. They ran Camp Solidarity at Castlewood, Virginia, and the Daughters of Mother Jones provided food and lodging on land donated by a retired UMWA miner. The Freedom Fighters also set up a phone bank to inform other people of the types of food that they could donate and how much food was needed. After Pittson, the Freedom Fighters continue to exist as a group of women who help to support the benefits for miners across the United States.

== Aftermath ==
In February 1990, the Pittston Coal Company and the UMWA came to a settlement. The current miners of Pittston would receive health and retirement benefits once again. Pittston Coal Company also had to pay around $10 million for the retirement benefits plan for pre-1974 miners. In return, Pittston was permitted to operate seven days a week as long as they were closed from 8am to 4pm on Sundays. Miners were also put on a rotating schedule in which every 28 days, they would work one week for 4 days and 10 hours each day.

Both groups had lost a considerable amount of money, Pittston from the slowdown of production and the UMWA for the cost of organizing the strike. At the end of the strike, the UMWA was fined around $64 million because of their actions during the strike. Many of the fines were not only because of violence that had erupted but also for the road blockages and other forms of civil disobedience. Union officials were personally charged $13,000 a day for the strike, and the union was charged $200,000 for their actions at Moss 3. Many people opposed the charges that were made against the UMWA and petitioned for them to be dropped. Although not all charges were, the vast majority were cleared. In return, union officials had to do 10,000 hours of community service to compensate for the removal of the fines.

Miners of the Pittston Coal Company were glad that a settlement had been reached and that they would once again be receiving health and retirement funds. However, because they were without benefits for such a long time, many people had gotten into financial trouble. During the strike, the costs of health care had to be paid out of pocket, and many miners did not have the resources to do so. As a result, many miners had accumulated debt. Another direct result of the Pittston Strike was the formation of the Coal Act, which was established in 1992 and made it mandatory by law for mining companies to provide health and retirement benefits for its workers.

At the time of the strike, Pittston was a strong coal company and the area was full of strikers protesting. After the strike, many of Pittston's coal plants were sold to Alpha Natural Resources. Pittston finally exited the coal business in 2001, and Alpha eventually became one of the nation's top three coal companies. Alpha Natural Resources declared bankruptcy in 2015. After the strike ended, Moss 3 was demolished, and a new plant was built and named after it (the new plant has been since demolished and the land reclaimed), and the recreational park that became Camp Solidarity has been reclaimed by nature and is now an open field. Though the physical aspects of the area have changed since the strike has ended, what has not changed is the feeling that the miners of Pittston accomplished, a win for their own benefits as well as benefits for the UMWA. The union's actions during the strike made it possible for thousands of miners to receive health care and retirement funds for years to come. Even though the miners were able to reach a settlement in early 1990, the case of the UMWA vs. Pittston Coal Company did not end in 1990. The fines of over $60 million did not come into bargaining until 1994 (~$115 million in 2024), and Pittston agreed to drop most of the charges. However, since the case was now in the court system, many courts wanted the UMWA to be responsible for all of the fines. The UMWA appealed all of the fines, and the case remained undecided for many years.

== Sources ==
- Ayres Jr., B. Drummond. "Coal Strike: Armageddon for U.M.W. and Leader?" The New York Times 15 August 1989: 1–2.
- Beckwith, Karen. "Women, Gender, and Nonviolence in Political Movements". PS, Political Science & Politics, 35(1), 75–81. Retrieved March 20, 2010, from Research Library. (Document ID: 1332165031).
- Birecree, Adrienne M. "The importance and implications of women's participation in the 1989–1990 Pittston coal strike". Journal of Economic Issues. Lincoln: Mar 1996. Vol. 30, Iss. 1; pg 187, 14 pgs.
- Brisbin, Richard A. Jr. A Strike like No Other Strike: Law & Resistance during the Pittston Coal Strike of 1989–1990. Baltimore: Johns Hopkins University Press, 2002. ISBN 0-8018-6901-3.
- "Coal Strike: First the Calm, Now the Storm." Time [New York City] 24 June 1989: 1.
- Crow, Peter. Do, Die, or Get Along: A Tale of Two Appalachian Towns. Athens: University of Georgia Press, 2007. ISBN 0-8203-2863-4.
- Demers, Raymond Y., C. William Michaels, Robert Frank, Kathy Fagan, Melissa McDiarmid, and Theresa Rohr. "Termination of Health Care Benefits for Pittston Mine Workers: Impact on the Health and Security of Miners and Their Families." Journal of Public Health Policy (1990): 474–80.
- Dotter, Earl. Tricities "1989 Pittston Coal Strike A Battle." Bristol Herald Courier. 6 September 2009. Accessed 25 March 2010.
- Hayes, Sharon. Times News."Twenty Years Later, Impact of Bitter Dispute between Pittston, UMWA Still Felt." Kingsport Times News | Kingsport, Tennessee. 26 June 2009. Accessed 26 March 2010.
- Laslett, John Henry Martin. The United Mine Workers of America: a Model of Industrial Solidarity? University Park: Pennsylvania State UP in Association with the Pennsylvania State University Libraries, 1996. ISBN 0-271-01537-3.
- McNeil, Bryan. "Do, Die, or Get Along: A Tale of Two Appalachian Towns". The Virginia Magazine of History and Biography. Richmond: 2007. Vol. 115, Iss. 4; pg 596, 2 pgs.
- Mulcahy, Richard P." A Strike like No Other Strike: Law & Resistance during the Pittston Coal Strike of 1989–1990". The Journal of American History. Bloomington: Jun 2004. Vol. 91, Iss. 1; pg. 342, 2 pgs.
- "A Strike like No Other Strike: Pittston Strike Holds Lessons for Today." United Mine Workers Journal 120.2 (2009): 4–12.
