= National Conference of State Societies =

The National Conference of State Societies is an umbrella organization for all societies representing states in the United States of America, as well as all of the inhabited territories of the United States and the federal district of Washington, D.C.

== History ==
The National Conference of State Societies (NCSS) was charted by Congress on April 3, 1952, when President Harry Truman signed Public Law 82-293 (36 U.S.C. 1505). But the association was also known by other names in the early 20th and late 19th Century and the early roots date back to at least a listing of officers in the Congressional Directory of 1876 when the group was known as the Central Association of the States. NCSS is an umbrella organization for all state societies whose members include state and territorial expatriates including students, members of the military, active and retired lobbyists and government workers, members of Congress and staff living in the national capital region. The estimated membership of about 55 state and territorial societies in January 2009 was about 22,000 people. Only Rhode Island was not represented in the group in early 2009 for want of an active state society.

=== Early days ===
State societies have been nonpartisan since World War I. Before that, some were nonpartisan but there were some partisan clubs called state associations between 1854 and 1917. The first state club was the Illinois Democratic Club of Washington City which was founded in 1854 by government clerks from Illinois loyal to President Franklin Pierce. Clubs were formed for Maryland and Louisiana in 1856. However, partisan identification could change quickly as it did when the Illinois club quickly converted to the Illinois Republican Association when President Abraham Lincoln took office in 1861. Members of early state associations were mostly made up of government clerks in the days before Civil Service reform, who wanted to stay on the good side of whichever party controlled the White House. State clubs were considered to be an obstacle to Civil Service reform during the first administration of President Grover Cleveland whose Commissioner of Civil Service, Bishop John H. Oberly of Illinois, tried to abolish all state clubs but did not succeed due to their support on Capitol Hill, according to newspapers of the time.

As Civil Service reforms finally did take hold in the 1890s, government clerks became more secure in their jobs and less worried about political networks. More state associations became nonpartisan and the wide admission of women members helped to change the focus from political activities to nonpartisan social and civic activities. State clubs of the early 1890s included the Wolverine State Society for members from Michigan and the Lone Star Society for members from Texas. In 1905, the Lone Star Society we renamed as the Texas State Society of Washington, DC by founder Dr. Oscar Wilkinson who has also served as a former president of the Mississippi State Society. Wilkinson invited other state associations both partisan and nonpartisan to a picnic in 1913 to start the Union of State Societies. After halting starts during the First World War, the group went through several name changes between 1919 and 1943 including the National Council of State Societies, the All States Society, the Pan State Society, the Association of State Society Officers and finally the Conference of State Societies which helped Civil Defense officials track aircraft over Washington, DC during World War II. Many military service men and women were invited to attend state society dances free of charge during World War II.

== Cherry blossom festival ==
In 1948 the Conference of State Societies joined the DC Commissioners in restarting the pre-war cherry blossom festival as a way to rebuild friendly relations with Japan. The role of the state societies was to sponsor events such as a ball and to sponsor state cherry blossom princesses to participate in festival activities. That is still a primary role for the NCSS in 2009 but there is also a coordinating committee for many such events organized under the umbrella of the National Cherry Blossom Festival. Today all state societies are nonpartisan and all include active participation by state members of Congress, many of whom have in the past and still serve as officers of state societies. For example, former President Lyndon B. Johnson was a president of the Texas State Society in 1955 when he was Senate Majority Leader. Former U.S. House Speaker Dennis Hastert was President of the Illinois State Society of Washington, DC from 1992 to 1994.

== Historical records ==
Historical newspaper articles from the archives of the Washington Evening Star and The Washington Post that track the history of the state societies and NCSS from about 1867 to the present time are found in a history photo album on the NCSS web site. See also a major article about state societies in The Washington Post Sunday Source Section from March 25, 2007, called "Matters of State" by reporter Dan Zak.

== Member State and Territorial Societies ==
- Alabama
- Alaska
- American Samoa
- Arizona
- Arkansas
- California
- Colorado
- Connecticut
- Delaware
- District of Columbia
- Florida
- Georgia
- Guam
- Hawaii
- Idaho
- Illinois
- Indiana
- Iowa
- Kansas
- Kentucky
- Louisiana
- Maine
- Maryland
- Massachusetts
- Michigan
- Minnesota
- Mississippi
- Missouri
- Montana
- Nebraska
- Nevada
- New Hampshire
- New Jersey
- New Mexico
- New York
- North Carolina
- North Dakota
- Northern Mariana Islands
- Ohio
- Oklahoma
- Oregon
- Pennsylvania
- Puerto Rico
- Rhode Island
- South Carolina
- South Dakota
- Tennessee
- Texas
- Utah
- Vermont
- US Virgin Islands
- Virginia
- Washington
- West Virginia
- Wisconsin
- Wyoming
