= West Virginian of the Year =

West Virginian of the Year is an annual selection by the editorial board of the Charleston Gazette (the combined board of that paper and the Charleston Daily Mail between 1961 and 1991) of the individual who best shows the "spirit of West Virginia". The winner can either be a native West Virginian who achieved after leaving the state, or a person living in the state for achievements in the state. The winner is announced in the last Sunday edition of the Charleston Gazette-Mail. It is considered similar to the Time Magazine person of the year award, on a state basis.

== Winners ==
- 1951: Okey Patteson, governor, advocated construction of West Virginia Turnpike
- 1952: Walter S. Hallanan, editor of Huntington Herald-Dispatch, chairman of the 1952 Republican National Convention
- 1953: Felix Stump, admiral, USN, commander of United States Pacific Fleet
- 1954: Chuck Yeager, general, USAF, test pilot
- 1955: Leonard Riggleman, president Morris Harvey College
- 1956: John Hoblitzell, Jr., senator, education advocate
- 1957: Michael Benedum, oil "wildcatter" donated fortune to a foundation for state improvement
- 1958: William Thompson, state trial court judge, advocated probation
- 1959: Jerry West basketball (WVU lost the NCAA Final) and Sam Huff football (New York Giants lost the NFL Championship), athletes at West Virginia University
- 1960: Fred Otto, civic leader, saved local DuPont plant from closure
- 1961: Charles Hodell, editor of Raleigh Register and Beckley Post-Herald, orphan with a disability
- 1962: Pearl Buck, author, won Nobel Prize
- 1963: Cyrus Vance, diplomat
- 1964: Jennings Randolph, senator, advocated Appalachian Regional Commission
- 1965: Leon Sullivan, minister, advocated affirmative action
- 1966: Walter Reuther, labor leader, president United Auto Workers
- 1967: Hilarion Cann, Fred Holloway, Samuel Cooper, & Wilburn C. Campbell, religious ministers, advocated affirmative action
- 1968: Phyllis Curtin and George Crumb, opera singer and composer
- 1969: Daniel Hale, physician and conservationist, advocated construction of flood control dams and clean water supply systems
- 1970: William Brotherton, state senate president, opposed corruption
- 1971: John Norman, physician, researcher in heart disease
- 1972: Arch Moore, governor, cited for "dynamic first term"
- 1973: Arnold Miller, labor leader, overthrew corrupt administration of United Mine Workers
- 1974: Robert Byrd, senator, named chairman of Senate Appropriations Committee
- 1975: James Harlow, physicist, president, West Virginia University
- 1976: James David Barber, political scientist Duke University, author
- 1977: Robert Byrd (2nd award), named Senate Majority Leader
- 1978: Mary Lee Settle, author
- 1979: Maurice Brooks, biologist, West Virginia University
- 1980: Charles Peters, political commentator, editor of Washington Monthly
- 1981: Sharon Rockefeller, state first lady, advocated PBS
- 1982: Arthur Recht, state trial court judge, ruled state school funding system unconstitutional
- 1983: James "Buck" Harless, timber and coal company owner, donated much of his fortune to Marshall University and other state projects
- 1984: Mary Lou Retton, gymnast, won gold medal at 1984 Summer Olympics
- 1985: Louise McNeill, poet
- 1986: Dale Nitzchke, president, Marshall University
- 1987: Roberta Emerson, curator, Huntington Museum of Art
- 1988: Don Nehlen, football coach at 11-1 West Virginia University
- 1989: Michael Carey, lawyer, United States Attorney, fought Democratic Party machine corruption in Mingo County, West Virginia
- 1990: Robert Byrd (3rd award), for appropriation "earmarks"
- 1991: Jay Rockefeller, senator
- 1992: Lyell Clay, Hazel Ruby McQuain, Charlie Erickson, Joan C. Edwards and "other philanthropists", for donations to state projects
- 1993: 1993 West Virginia Mountaineers football team, which went 11-1
- 1994: Henry Louis Gates, professor, Harvard University
- 1995: Robert Frasure, diplomat, Assistant Secretary of State, for work in Bosnia
- 1996: Gaston Caperton, governor, cited for "having few scandals"
- 1997: Elizabeth Hallanan, federal judge, found a school prayer unconstitutional (decision later overruled by United States Supreme Court)
- 1998: Thomas J. Lopez, admiral, USN, commander of Navy in Bosnia
- 1999: Bob Pruett and 1999 Marshall Thundering Herd football team, which went 13-0
- 2000: John T. Chambers, businessman, founder of Cisco
- 2001: West Virginia National Guard
- 2002: Robert Byrd (4th award) for opposing Operation Iraqi Freedom
- 2003: Jessica Lynch, private, USA, briefly a Prisoner of War
- 2004: Charlie Jones, businessman, owner of coal barge company
- 2005: "West Virginia Soldiers and their families"
- 2006: David Hardesty, president, West Virginia University
- 2007: Jennifer Garner, actress
- 2008: Betty Schoenbaum, widow of founder of Shoney's, philanthropist
- 2009: Jim Justice, businessman, saved The Greenbrier from bankruptcy
- 2010: Allen Tackett, general, WVANG
- 2011: Landau Eugene Murphy, Jr., singer, won America's Got Talent
- 2012: Dan Foster, legislator and medical doctor, supported single-payer health care system
- 2013: Jay Rockefeller, senator
- 2014: Boy Scouts of America, built large campground near Fayetteville
- 2015: Katherine Johnson, NASA mathematician
- 2016: Sylvia Mathews Burwell, U.S. Secretary of Health and Human Services
- 2017: Rahul Gupta, physician, battle the opioid epidemic
- 2018: Teachers and school workers
- 2019: Larry Groce, singer-songwriter and radio host
- 2020: Romelia Hodges, public health advocate
- 2021: Joe Manchin, senator
- 2022: Hershel "Woody" Williams, U.S. Marine Corps reserve warrant officer, Medal of Honor recipient
- 2023: Paul Smith, chef
