= Earling, West Virginia =

Unincorporated community in West Virginia, United States

- Census-designated place
- Location within West Virginia Location within the United States
- Coordinates: 37°45′59″N 81°54′55″W
- Country: United States
- State: West Virginia
- County: Logan

Area
  - Total: 0.19 sq mi (0.48 km^{2})
  - Land: 0.17 sq mi (0.44 km^{2})
  - Water: 0.015 sq mi (0.04 km^{2})
- Elevation: 732 ft (223 m)

Population (2020)
  - Total: 76
  - Density: 450/sq mi (170/km^{2})
- Time zone: UTC-5 (Eastern (EST))
  - Summer (DST): UTC-4 (EDT)
- ZIP Code: 25632
- Area codes: 304 & 681
- GNIS feature ID: 1538495
- FIPS code: 54-23020

Earling is an unincorporated community and census-designated place (CDP) in Logan County, West Virginia, United States. It was first listed as a CDP prior to the 2020 census, in which the population was 76. The Earling post office closed on July 1, 1989. The town now shares ZIP Code 25632 with Lyburn and Taplin.

The community used to be known as "Ferndale" and "Manbar"; its name was changed to Earling in 1906. The present name is after a pioneer settler.

== Geography ==
Earling is in south-central Logan County, on the east side of the Guyandotte River. West Virginia Route 10 formerly went through the center of town but is now a four-lane highway that bypasses the town on the west side of the river; the closest access is half a mile to the northwest from Rich Creek Road. The town of Man is 2.75 miles (4.43 km) to the southeast.

According to the U.S. Census Bureau, the Earling CDP has a total area of 0.19 square miles (0.48 km^{2}), of which 0.02 square miles (0.04 km^{2}), or 8.70%, are water. The Guyandotte River, which comprises the water area, is a north-flowing waterway which joins the Ohio River east of Huntington.
