= Gilbert Creek, West Virginia =

Gilbert, West Virginia
- CDP
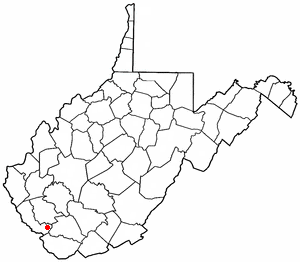
- Location of Gilbert Creek, West Virginia
- Coordinates: 37°34′56″N 81°54′7″W
- Country: United States
- State: West Virginia
- County: Mingo

Area
  - Total: 11.6 sq mi (30.0 km^{2})
  - Land: 11.6 sq mi (30.0 km^{2})
  - Water: 0 sq mi (0 km^{2})
- Elevation: 1,106 ft (337 m)

Population (2020)
  - Total: 1,136
  - Density: 98.1/sq mi (37.9/km^{2})
- Time zone: UTC-5 (Eastern (EST))
  - Summer (DST): UTC-4 (EDT)
- Area code: 304
- FIPS code: 54-30777
- GNIS feature ID: 1867649

Gilbert Creek is a census-designated place (CDP) in Mingo County, West Virginia, United States. The population was 1,136 at the 2020 census (up from 1,090 at the 2010 census). The community takes its name from nearby Gilbert Creek.

== Geography ==
Gilbert Creek is located at 37°34′56″N 81°54′7″W (37.582191, -81.902044).

According to the United States Census Bureau, the CDP has a total area of 11.6 square miles (30.0 km^{2}), all land.

== Demographics ==
As of the census of 2000, there were 1,582 people, 640 households, and 474 families residing in the CDP. The population density was 62.2 people per square mile (24.0/km^{2}). There were 706 housing units at an average density of 27.8/sq mi (10.7/km^{2}). The racial makeup of the CDP was 98.99% White, 0.38% African American, and 0.63% from two or more races. Hispanic or Latino of any race were 0.13% of the population.

There were 640 households, out of which 34.4% had children under the age of 18 living with them, 61.6% were married couples living together, 8.4% had a female householder with no husband present, and 25.8% were non-families. 23.3% of all households were made up of individuals, and 9.2% had someone living alone who was 65 years of age or older. The average household size was 2.47 and the average family size was 2.92.

In the CDP, the population was spread out, with 22.6% under the age of 18, 10.5% from 18 to 24, 32.9% from 25 to 44, 23.5% from 45 to 64, and 10.6% who were 65 years of age or older. The median age was 37 years. For every 100 females, there were 98.7 males. For every 100 females age 18 and over, there were 102.5 males.

The median income for a household in the CDP was $16,625, and the median income for a family was $24,706. Males had a median income of $35,455 versus $12,188 for females. The per capita income for the CDP was $12,689. About 32.7% of families and 36.4% of the population were below the poverty line, including 46.1% of those under age 18 and 30.8% of those age 65 or over.
