= South 65 =

American country music boy band

- Origin: Nashville, Tennessee, U.S.
- Genres: Country
- Years active: 1997–2001
- Labels: Atlantic Nashville
- Past members: Jerimy Pat Koeltzow; Lance Aaron Leslie; Brenton "Brent" Michael Parker; Stephen Phillip Parker; Alfred "Doug" Douglas Urie

South 65 (also spelled South Sixty-Five) was an American country music boy band. The group was composed of vocalists Lance Leslie, Brent Parker, Stephen Parker, Jerimy Koeltzow, and Doug Urie. Between 1997 and its disbanding in 2001, South 65 charted five singles on the Billboard Hot Country Songs charts, in addition to recording two albums on Atlantic Records. In 2006, former vocalist Lance Leslie founded another group called Rio Grand.

== Biography ==
Delious Kennedy, a member of the R&B group All-4-One, wanted to form a boy band for country music. He first picked brothers Brenton and Stephen Parker, and later held a nationwide talent search to find the other three members. All five members were in place by 1997. Delious and Anthony L. Smith produced the band's 1998 self-titled debut album, which reached a peak of No. 70 on the Billboard Top Country Albums charts. Its singles included "A Random Act of Senseless Kindness", "No Easy Goodbye", and "Baby's Got My Number", which respectively reached No. 55, No. 56 and No. 60 on the Hot Country Singles & Tracks (now Hot Country Songs) charts. In 2000, the band released "Love Bug (Bite Me)", which reached No. 72 on that chart and never appeared on an album.

South 65 released its second and final album for Atlantic Nashville in 2001. Titled Dream Large, the album went to No. 63 on the country albums charts. Bobby Huff produced three tracks, and Buddy Cannon and Norro Wilson produced the other seven. This album included a cover of Charlie Rich's 1973 Number One hit "The Most Beautiful Girl", which South 65 took to No. 54 on the country charts. After the album's release, the members of South 65 parted ways due to the closure of Atlantic Records' Nashville division. Urie began a solo career, while Leslie joined Rio Grand, which he has since left.

== Critical reception ==
Charlotte Dillon of Allmusic gave four stars out of five to both of the band's albums. She said that the first album did not have a distinctively country music sound, but called the group "revitalizing" and said that the first album's songs were "mostly done in sweet harmonies sure to set young female hearts to fluttering." She said of the second album that it had a more country sound with some R&B influences. An uncredited review in Billboard gave a negative review, saying that the members had "anonymous, pretty voices" and that the songs "are not very convincing country." Jennifer Webb of About.com gave Dream Large a favorable review, saying, "South 65 amazes me with their harmonizing and vocal abilities."

== South Sixty-Five (1998) ==
South Sixty-Five

Studio album by South 65
- Released: December 1, 1998
- Genre: Country
- Length: 36:17
- Label: Atlantic Nashville
- Producer: Delious, Anthony L. Smith

=== Track listing ===
1. "Baby's Got My Number" (Roger Cook, Anthony L. Smith) – 3:00
2. "Climbing Up Mt. Everest" (Tommy Lee James, Robin Lerner) – 3:03
3. "I'm There" (Kelly Shiver, Jon Vezner) – 4:12
4. "Uncle Hickory's General Store" (Stephanie C. Brown, Larry Wayne Clark) – 3:16
5. "One of the Precious Few" (Walt Aldridge, Bob DiPiero) – 3:40
6. "All of This and More" (Jim Photoglo, Smith) – 3:54
7. "No Easy Goodbye" (Jerry Holland) – 4:07
8. "Love Will Last" (Michael Dulaney, Tim Norton) – 3:13
9. "To Me" (James, Roberta Schiller) – 4:07
10. "A Random Act of Senseless Kindness" (Gary Baker, Frank J. Myers, Jerry Williams) – 3:57

=== Musicians ===
As listed on Allmusic.

- Bruce Bouton – steel guitar
- Mike Brignardello – bass guitar
- Dennis Burnside – piano
- Mike Chapman – bass guitar
- Tabitha Fair – background vocals
- Owen Hale – drums
- Chris Leuzinger – electric guitar
- Greg Morrow – drums
- Steve Nathan – synthesizer
- Danny Parks – acoustic guitar
- Barry Walsh – piano
- Biff Watson – acoustic guitar
- John Willis – acoustic guitar
- Curtis Young – background vocals

== Dream Large (2001) ==
Dream Large

Studio album by South 65
- Released: May 1, 2001
- Genre: Country
- Label: Atlantic Nashville
- Producer: Bobby Huff (tracks 1, 3, 8); Buddy Cannon and Norro Wilson (tracks 2, 4-7, 9, 10)

=== Track listing ===
1. "The Most Beautiful Girl (2001 version)" (Billy Sherrill, Norro Wilson, Rory Michael Bourke) – 3:29
2. "Like an Angel" (David Leone, Pat Buchanan) – 3:34
3. "I Swear to You" (Bobby Huff) – 3:26
4. "Only Perfect" (Mark McGuinn, Trey Matthews) – 3:13
5. "All I Ever Did" (Neal Coty, Randy VanWarmer) – 3:39
6. "The Great Love of 1998" (Bob DiPiero, Craig Wiseman, Tim Nichols) – 3:30
7. "One Moment" (Chris Waters, Wes Hightower) – 3:37
8. "Gettin' the Feelin'" (Huff) – 3:33
9. "Even If" (Liz Hengber, Tommy Lee James) – 3:07
10. "Dream Large" (Danny Mayo) – 3:32

=== Musicians ===
As listed in liner notes.

- David Angel – strings
- Eddie Bayers – drums
- Larry Beaird – acoustic guitar
- David Briggs – piano
- Arbry Burcon – banjo
- David Davidson – strings
- Dan Dugmore – steel guitar
- Larry Franklin – fiddle
- Paul Franklin – steel guitar
- Rob Hajacos – fiddle
- John Hobbs – Hammond B-3 organ
- Bobby Huff – acoustic guitar, keyboards, drums, percussion
- John Jorgenson – electric guitar
- Paul Leim – drums
- B. James Lowry – acoustic guitar
- Randy McCormick – piano, keyboards, Hammond B-3 organ
- Terry McMillan – harmonica
- Dale Oliver – electric guitar
- Danny Parks – acoustic guitar
- Larry Paxton – bass guitar
- Buck Reid – steel guitar
- Randy Threet – bass guitar
- Jason West – bass guitar
- John Willis – electric guitar
- Bob Wray – bass guitar

== Discography ==
=== Albums ===
Title	Album details	Peak positions
Title	Album details	US Country
South Sixty-Five	Release date: December 1, 1998; Label: Atlantic Nashville	70
Dream Large	Release date: May 1, 2001; Label: Atlantic Nashville	63

=== Singles ===
Year	Single	Peak positions	Album
Year	Single	US Country	Album
1998	"A Random Act of Senseless Kindness"	55	South Sixty-Five
1999	"No Easy Goodbye"	56	South Sixty-Five
1999	"Baby's Got My Number"	60	South Sixty-Five
2000	"Love Bug (Bite Me)"	72	single only
2001	"The Most Beautiful Girl (2001 version)"	54	Dream Large

=== Music videos ===
Year	Video	Director
1998	"A Random Act of Senseless Kindness"	Bob Gabrielsen
1999	"No Easy Goodbye"	Bob Gabrielsen
2001	"The Most Beautiful Girl"	
