= Cactus Choir (band) =

American country music group

- Origin: San Francisco, California, United States
- Genres: Country
- Years active: 1997–1998
- Label: Curb/Universal
- Past members: Marty Atkinson; Gary Hooker; Dave Ristrim; Tim Hensley; Shane Hicks; Cal Ball; Eric Nelson

Cactus Choir was an American country music group from San Francisco, California, composed of Marty Atkinson (vocals), Gary Hooker (guitar), Dave Ristrim (steel guitar), Tim Hensley (banjo), Shane Hicks (keyboards), Cal Ball (bass) and Eric Nelson (drums). The group's self-titled debut album was released by Curb/Universal on March 24, 1998. Jesse Mullins of American Cowboy gave the album a favorable review, writing that the musicians "come from varied musical backgrounds but have blended their talents well." Mullins compared their "wistful harmonies" to Restless Heart and Blackhawk.

The group's first single, "Step Right Up", was released on December 9, 1997. It peaked at number 62 on the Billboard Hot Country Singles & Tracks chart. A music video for the song aired on CMT.

In 2011, Atkinson formed the duo Blue Cactus Choir with Katy Boyd.

== Discography ==
=== Albums ===
Title	Album details
Cactus Choir	Release date: March 24, 1998; Label: Curb/Universal

=== Singles ===
Year	Single	Peak positions	Album
Year	Single	US Country	Album
1997	"Step Right Up"	62	Cactus Choir
1998	"It's Your Move"	—	Cactus Choir
"—" denotes releases that did not chart

=== Music videos ===
Year	Video	Director
1997	"Step Right Up"	Jim Hershleder
