= Earlington =

Earlington may refer to:

- Earlington, Kentucky, United States
- Earlington, Pennsylvania, United States
- Earlington, West Hill, a neighborhood of Bryn Mawr-Skyway, Washington, United States
- Earlington Heights station, a Metrorail station in Brownsville, Miami-Dade County, Florida, United States

== See also ==
- Eardington, Shropshire, England
- Earling (disambiguation)
