= Sweetwater Rain =

American country music band

- Origin: Nashville, Tennessee, U.S.
- Genre: Country
- Years active: 2012-2013
- Label: Curb
- Spinoff of: Rio Grand
- Past members: Ruthie Collins; Fred Stallcup; Thomas Rennick; Danny Rivera

Sweetwater Rain was an American country music band from Nashville, Tennessee. The band consisted of Fred Stallcup (guitar), Thomas Rennick (bass guitar), and Danny Rivera (lead vocals, guitar), along with guest vocalist Ruthie Collins. They recorded two singles for Curb Records.

== Biography ==
Prior to the foundation of Sweetwater Rain, both Stallcup and Rivera were members of the Texas-based country band Rio Grand, who recorded for Curb Records in 2006.

After Rio Grand broke up, Stallcup and Rivera joined bassist Thomas Rennick in Nashville, Tennessee to form Sweetwater Rain. The label also included female vocalist Ruthie Collins on the band's recordings, as she was also signed with Curb at the time. However, she did not perform with the band in live settings due to scheduling conflicts and her role in this capacity was instead taken by Marisa Rhodes. The group worked with Anthony Smith to record material in 2012 and 2013, including the single "Starshine". They also were signed as an opening act for Rascal Flatts.

Robert K. Oermann of MusicRow rated "Starshine" favorably, praising Collins's harmony vocals and the musical arrangement. "Starshine" charted for 11 weeks on Billboard Hot Country Songs between 2012 and 2013, peaking at number 51. Another single, "Pray for Me", was released in 2013.
