= Trini Triggs =

American singer-songwriter

- Born: August 5, 1965 (age 60)
- Origin: Natchitoches, Louisiana, United States
- Genres: Country
- Occupation: singer
- Years active: 1998–present
- Labels: MCG/Curb; Asylum-Curb

Trini Triggs (born August 8, 1965 in Natchitoches, Louisiana) is an American country music artist. In 1998, he released a self-titled album for MCG/Curb Records; produced by Chuck Howard and Anthony Smith, the album produced three singles on the Billboard Hot Country Singles & Tracks (now Hot Country Songs) charts that year. Triggs also charted a fourth single in 2004 on Asylum-Curb.

== Discography ==
=== Albums ===
Title	Album details
Trini Triggs	Release date: 1998; Label: MCG/Curb Records
Best of Trini Triggs	Release date: May 28, 2013; Label: Curb Records

=== Singles ===
Year	Single	Peak chart positions		Album
Year	Single	US Country	CAN Country	Album
1998	"Straight Tequila"	47	91	Trini Triggs
1999	"Horse to Mexico"	53	89	Trini Triggs
2000	"The Wreckin' Crew"	62	—	Trini Triggs
2002	"You Never Can Tell"	—	—	Inside Traxx 2002
2002	"I'm Only in It for the Love"	—	—	singles only
2004	"Heaven on Earth"	59	—	singles only
"—" denotes releases that did not chart

=== Music videos ===
Year	Video	Director
1998	"Straight Tequila"	Chris Rogers
2000	"The Wreckin' Crew"	
2002	"I'm Only In It for Love"	
