= Jamie Slocum =

American singer-songwriter

Jamie Slocum was an American Christian worship leader, singer, songwriter and producer from Grants Pass, Oregon. He grew up in Phoenix and moved to Nashville in the 1990s. He succumbed to injuries after being run over by a bus in Scottsdale, Arizona on January 10, 2023. He was 52.

He began as a staff songwriter for Curb Records. Songwriter and producer Mike Curb thought that Slocum should be performing his own music, leading to a record deal. Slocum toured and produced music. He was signed to Curb and lived in Nashville with his family. He wrote and produced hit songs in country/pop and Christian music as well as jingles. "Grace Changes Everything" was his first hit as a solo artist and reached No. 7 (AC radio 2000).

Jamie Slocum's single " Dependence" (Curb 2009) was a No. 1 hit for 11 weeks on light AC radio. An album, "Dependence" came out in June 2011. The "expanded edition" contained "Just Another Mountain". (Dependence "expanded edition" was Slocum's first No. 1 album. The title song was nominated for a Dove Award "Inspirational Song of the Year". Also on the album, "Fragile" was a top 10 song on Billboard light AC radio in March 2010. "Dependence" "Fragile " and "Just Another Mountain" had videos. There were plans for a tour. In 2016. he had an album, Safe released on April 1, 2016 on Curb Records. The music was Slocum's first release in four years. It was produced and arranged by Slocum.

== Discography ==
Slocum's first album entitled Somewhere Under Heaven, produced by Keith Olsen and Slocum was recorded and mixed at Goodnight L.A. studios. It is considered to lean more to pop music than other music of his which is contemporary Christian. It featured Elliot Easton of The Cars, Alex Ligertwood of Santana, Richard Baker on keyboards and programming and Tim Pierce on guitar. Slocum received a Dove nomination for "New Artist of the Year".

His second album was Grace Changes Everything (2000) on Freedom Records. He produced the album and had his first major hit with the title track. The album featured "Wounded" and a cover version of "Bless the Broken Road". The album has a Norman Greenbaum classic song ("Spirit in the Sky") which predates Slocum's birth. His next album was My Heart Knows (2003) on Curb which included two No. 1 songs, "By Your Side" and "I Cannot Turn Away". In September 2011, Jamie Slocum's music was used in "Breaking the Press", a 20th Century Fox film. His songs " Dependence" and the theme song, Jesus Take my Hand" (Curb) were in the film. In August 2012, a new song from Jamie Slocum's upcoming 2013 Curb project, "You are the Reason" was released to radio. It was produced and written by Slocum and Chicago lead singer and bass player Jason Scheff.

== Sources ==
- Ringgenberg, Patty (July 24, 1999). "Review of Jamie Slocum, "Grace Changes Everything"". The Wichita Eagle, (Wichita, Kansas). p. 3E.
