= Rio Grand =

American country music group

- Origin: Texas, United States
- Genre: Country
- Years active: 2006–2012
- Label: Curb
- Spinoffs: Sweetwater Rain
- Past members: Lance Leslie; Tommy Rennick; Danny Rivera; Fred Stallcup
- Website: http://www.riograndband.com

Rio Grand was an American Texas Country group founded by Lance Leslie (harmonica, vocals), Tommy Rennick (vocals, bass guitar), Danny Rivera (lead vocals, guitar, banjo, lap steel guitar, Dobro, and Fred Stallcup (lead guitar, vocals). All four members were natives of the state of Texas. In addition, Tommy Rennick was previously a member of 37 South and the Allison Paige band. Fred Stallcup was previously a member of Lucious Funk. Lance Leslie was formerly in South 65.

In 2006, the group was signed to Asylum-Curb Records. Shortly afterward, their first single (titled "Kill Me Now") was released to radio, reaching a peak of 42 on the Billboard Hot Country Songs charts. Co-written by John Rich, Vicky McGehee and Anthony L. Smith, it received a positive rating from Deborah Evans Price of Billboard, who called it "promising". The band released an album, Painted Pony, in 2010.

Stallcup and Rivera found a second band in 2012 called Sweetwater Rain, which was also signed with Curb.

== Discography ==
=== Extended plays ===
Title	Album details
Painted Pony	Release date: January 5, 2010; Label: Curb Records

=== Singles ===
Year	Single	Peak positions	Album
Year	Single	US Country	Album
2006	"Kill Me Now"	42	Painted Pony
2007	"That's My Memory"	—	—N/a
2007	"The Storm Inside of Me"	—	Painted Pony
2008	"God's Got a Bigger Plan"	—	Painted Pony
2009	"Nothing to Go On"	—	—N/a
2010	"Painted Pony"	—	Painted Pony
2010	"Beckett's Back Forty"	—	—N/a
2010	"I Love Beer"	—	—N/a
"—" denotes releases that did not chart
