= West Virginia State Society =

U.S. nonprofit organization

West Virginia State Society of Washington, D.C.
- Abbreviation: WVSS
- Formation: 12 September 1914
- Founder: David W. Gall
- Type: Non-Profit Organization
- Headquarters: Washington, D.C.
- Website: www.westvirginiastatesociety.org

The West Virginia State Society of Washington, D.C. (WVSS) was founded for those who live in the Washington, D.C. metropolitan area and have West Virginia connections. WVSS is a non-profit organization that hosts opportunities for West Virginians located in Washington, D.C., to gather, socialize, and create a strong identity in the city.

== History ==
Founded on September 12, 1914, the Society's first president was David W. Gall. Among the 78 original members were U.S. Senators, Nathan B. Scott and Davis Elkins. In 1939, State Societies began to coordinate events and in the late forties organized a Conference of State Societies. On April 3, 1952, Congress formally created the Conference of State Societies. The West Virginia State Society was led by U.S. Senator Robert C. Byrd in 1963. On July 5, 1968, the name of the Conference was changed to the National Conference of State Societies. WVSS is a member of the NCSS.

Four past Presidents of the National Conference of State Societies have been members of the West Virginia State Society of Washington, D.C. Additionally, the Society has been honored with a dinner with President of the United States of America in 1978, and has received the Haines Award from the NCSS in 1977–78.

== See also ==
- National Conference of State Societies
