= Keith Perry (singer) =

American singer-songwriter

- Origin: Gilbert, West Virginia, United States
- Genres: Country, Christian
- Occupation: Singer-songwriter
- Instruments: Vocals fiddle mandolin
- Years active: 1996–2002
- Label: Curb

Keith Perry is an American country music and Christian music artist. He has recorded three albums for the Curb Records label.

Perry began playing mandolin and fiddle at an early age; by age 14, he toured with country music artist Mel Street, and later became a member of the Revival Spirits, a gospel music group. He later worked as a paramedic and coal miner before moving to Nashville, Tennessee in 1987. Perry landed a songwriting deal in 1990, and was signed to Curb Records as a recording artist in 1995. Two singles, "All I Give a Darn About Is You" and "I'm Gonna Hurt Her on the Radio", were released but failed to make the country charts.

== Discography ==
=== Albums ===
Title	Album details
Keith Perry	Release date: August 24, 1999; Label: Curb Records
Inspirational Favorites	Release date: November 20, 2001; Label: Curb Records

=== Singles ===
Year	Single	Album
1996	"All I Give a Darn About Is You"	Keith Perry
1997	"When I Could Fly"	Keith Perry
1999	"I'm Gonna Hurt Her on the Radio"	Keith Perry
2002	"Mama Was Right"	Inspirational Favorites

=== Music videos ===
Year	Video
1997	"When I Could Fly"
