= Taplin, West Virginia =

- Unincorporated community
- Location within West Virginia Location within the United States
- Coordinates: 37°45′30″N 81°53′44″W
- Country: United States
- State: West Virginia
- County: Logan
- Elevation: 732 ft (223 m)
- Time zone: UTC-5 (Eastern (EST))
  - Summer (DST): UTC-4 (EDT)
- Area codes: 304 & 681
- GNIS feature ID: 1555781

Taplin is an unincorporated community and coal town in Logan County, West Virginia, United States. Taplin is located on the Guyandotte River, 1.6 miles (2.6 km) northwest of Man. Taplin had a post office, which closed on March 7, 1998.
