= Advisory board =

Body providing strategic advice to an organisation

An advisory board is a body that provides non-binding strategic advice to the management of a corporation, organization, or foundation. The informal nature of an advisory board gives greater flexibility in structure and management compared to the board of directors. Unlike the board of directors, the advisory board does not have authority to vote on corporate matters or bear legal fiduciary responsibilities. Many new or small businesses choose to have advisory boards in order to benefit from the knowledge of others, without the expense or formality of the board of directors.

== Function ==
The function of an advisory board is to offer assistance to enterprises with anything from marketing to managing human resources to influencing the direction of regulators. Advisory boards are composed of accomplished experts offering innovative advice and dynamic perspectives. Meeting quarterly or biannually, boards can provide strategic direction, guide quality improvement, and assess program effectiveness.

Entrepreneurs, especially from startup companies or small business may not want to dilute their control of their business by establishing a board of directors with formal responsibilities and authorities. Thus, an advisory board may be a more suitable solution to entrepreneurs who want access to high-quality advice and network in the industry. Advisory board, as an external group, could also provide non-biased information and advice to entrepreneurs.

Advisory boards can be implemented in various different areas, including science, medicine, technology, editorial policy, citizen participation, and other topics. The Advisory Board Sector has grown by 52% since 2019 according to the State of the Market Global Report 2021.

=== Roles and responsibilities of advisory board members ===
- developing an understanding of the business, market and industry trends
- provide "wise counsel" on issues raised by owners/directors or management
- provide unbiased insights and ideas from a third point-of-view (not involved in the operation of the business)
- encourage and support the exploration of new business ideas
- act as a resource for executives
- provide a social networking platform for directors and the company
- encourage the development of a governance framework that enables sustainable growth of the company
- monitor business performance
- impose challenges to directors and management that could improve the business

== Reasons for creating an advisory board ==
The main reason to create an advisory board is to seek expertise outside of the company. Advisory board members should provide the company with knowledge, understanding and strategic thinking of the industry or management of the company.

Companies should seek advisory board members whose qualities complement the existing board of directors and not mask gaps in knowledge or skill in the main board. An advisory board strengthens the existing board, but does not interfere with authorities of the existing board. The former editor of The Economist, also an advisory board member, once said, “They [advisory boards] are there to give focus to or sometimes challenge research and intelligence work being done in the company, thus avoiding groupthink and giving direction on big picture issues.”

== Creating and operating an advisory board ==
There are two key questions to be asked when creating and operating an advisory board. The first question is who is trying to achieve what from an advisory board. The second question is how the business of the board should be conducted. The following issues need to be addressed.

=== Mandate ===
The type of advisory board members should be determined by the nature of what is sought and expected from them by the enterprise. Advisory board members should have distinctive knowledge on different aspects of business such as marketing, product development, and sales techniques that are of use to the directors.

A lack of definition in “what is sought from the advisory board” or “what sort of advice is to be sought” would lead to a disorganized board, which eventually could lead to an advisory board that provide less value per dollar or hour invested than a well-mandated one. Eventually, it could result in a waste of resources and time for the enterprise and the advisory board members.

=== Focus ===
The advisory board must determine what the focus of the committee is, whether it is a broad focus or a narrow one on a specific product feature. Individuals in an advisory board should share a common goal or similar interests.

=== Size ===
Size of an advisory board influences the efficiency of delivering ongoing information and effectiveness of organizing board meetings. A large advisory board may result in managerial issues. Therefore, it is recommended that an advisory board begin with the advisory board leader, and grow from a fairly small size to its ultimate number. Group dynamics suggests the maximum size for an advisory board is eight members, which takes into account the need for enterprise people and other facilitators at meetings. Some advisory board's mandate may require more significant representation of a specific and large number of constituencies.

=== Meeting organization and frequency ===
The functioning of an advisory board is affected significantly by how effectively the group's activities are organized and directed. A fixed meeting should be held regularly (monthly, annually or other) and advisory board members must be well informed of the purpose and background information of the meeting in order for them to provide valuable advice.

A corollary should be provided to advisory board members, which should be of an appropriate length, organized, comprehensible and informative. While it should be concise, it should provide enough details to provide advisory board members a suitable foundation for them to advise on the business. Confidentiality of the information discussed in the meeting should be considered.

A skilled facilitator, administrator or corporate secretary is required to organize schedules of advisory board meetings and meeting materials. The facilitator or chair of the board should be committed and aware of time management for the meeting. An agenda could improve the organization and time management for the meeting.

=== Term of membership ===
Advisory board members can be appointed to specific terms i.e. one, two or three years ensuring them to actively commit to the company and prevent them from getting too comfortable with their positions. Term of membership is also important when it comes to expansion of the board; term of membership ensures that the size of the advisory board remains efficient and manageable.

=== Compensation ===
Advisory board members serve an enterprise for a range of reasons, from personal loyalty to direct compensation.

== Benefits and drawbacks ==
=== Benefits of an advisory board ===
The benefits of having an advisory board over board of directors may include the following:

- Distance control

Multinational companies have local companies running their business in a particular foreign jurisdiction for lower costs e.g. tax, price of raw materials, and organizational benefits. However, giving authority to an outside group of directors in the local company may increase risks and instability of the multinational corporation. Since an advisory board can operate in a different location, with different cultural and business norms, in a different language, multinational companies may choose to have an advisory board instead of a localized board of directors in order to avoid loss of control.

- Accountability

An advisory board can provide accountability to keep the organization on track, as staff are expected to report on progress.

- Preparation for board of directors

Companies may choose to have an advisory board before they have a board of directors. The development of an effective board of directors requires a group of individuals with good chemistry and has the combination of appropriate skills to propel the business. Having an advisory board allows companies to assess the commitments and capabilities of each individual and observe the chemistry between them before appointing them to a board of directors.

- Higher efficiency

A large board of directors may grow to an unmanageable size where organizational complexity and communication breakdown may occur, leading to ineffective and inefficient function of the board. A smaller advisory board, without the complexity of authority involved in a board of directors, may work more effectively compared to a board of directors that grows in size as the corporation grows.

- Formal advice

The complexity and speed of enterprises often make it difficult to seek advice on any particular topic. Enterprises may also find building trust in any person or group to provide on-going and meaningful guidance difficult. An advisory board can then provide the degree of consistency, longevity and background knowledge as advisory board members provide reliable advice on particular issues. Advisory board members may receive compensation for committing to their positions. This gives incentives to advisory board members to provide quality advice and ensure that a request for assistance is taken formally.

- Less pressure on executives

Executives can express partially defined or a tentative view to an advisory board since an advisory board's sole purpose is to provide advice. This allows them to “test-drive options” before they face the board of directors which demands definitive and assertive business decisions. The board of directors assesses the CEO and establishes his or her compensation. While an advisory board may induce change in the company for the benefits of the company, a board of directors inducing change in the company could suggest a lack of confidence in the senior management team. This imposes great pressure on senior executives and could become a barrier for senior executives to express their issues and seek advice from the board. Thus, an advisory board could be a 'safe harbor' for senior executives to seek advice and test business options.

- Directorial Input

Directors and Assistant Directors are still required to bring any changes to policy or financial matters to the board for direction. No directors or assistant directors should make any changes without board approval.

- Focused input

An enterprise may need advice on a particular aspect of its business (such as marketing, product direction, customer service or contact network expansion). While board of directors need to take into account all aspects and go through a series of administrative proceedings, e.g. formal approval and/or ratification, an advisory board can focus directly on a particular issue and give advice.

=== Drawbacks of an advisory board ===
The drawbacks of having an advisory board instead of a board of directors may include the following:

- Less compensation

An advisory board deals with a more narrow range of issues and meet less often than a board of directors. There is less commitment for advisory board members compared to directors on the board. This is reflected in the lower compensation advisory board members receive as compared to those on the board of directors. Nevertheless, the compensation for advisory board members depends on various factors, including return of investments, time, organization and cost.

- Fiduciary duty/liability issues

A board of directors is exposed to a variety of legislated liabilities, fiduciary and other duties. Responsibilities include unpaid wages, unpaid taxes, environmental damage, etc. By subjecting directors to such liabilities and fiduciary, directors are forced to make decisions and establish policies in a way that minimizes risks. Whereas, an advisory board is not subjected to fiduciary duties or liabilities and therefore could influence the enterprise by providing risky advice.
