= Bituminous Coal Operators Association =

Bituminous Coal Operators Association (BCOA) is a coal mining lobbying organization. It was founded in 1950 by various companies to deal with the UMWA and unionizing of mines during the change from human labor to mechanical labor. The BCOA would strike deals between miners, mine companies, and coal buying companies to provide a steady flow of continuous labor and a steady purchasing price for coal. The main deals normally contained negotiations of some miners being put out of work by mechanizations while the miners left would be guaranteed a steady job and pay as long as they agreed to not hold up progress with strikes and other activities. In addition, the BCOA hears requests from the UMWA employees for pay raises but often results in unprotected employees being laid off after a deal has been reached. The current president of BCOA is David M Young. He is the main representative for the BCOA and lobbyist.

== History ==
BCOA was formed in 1950 as a group to negotiate with the UMWA on behalf of large coal companies located in the Appalachian region. BCOA agreed to provide job security to workers in mining companies who were part of BCOA and also negotiate wages and benefits. UMWA and BCOA came to an agreement that miners would not strike against layoffs if they were allowed health benefits and a fair wage. BCOA still exists today but is much smaller organization and is now mainly used for lobbying for important coal issues. BCOA recently has been working with the UMWA and Murray mines to negotiate a new contract between thousands of workers in West Virginia, Ohio, and Pennsylvania.

== Legacy of the Health and Retirement Agreement ==
In 1946, under President John L. Lewis, the union created The Welfare and Retirement Fund, a multi-employer benefit plan. This was an entirely new method for benefits and pensions because it introduced health care for the union workers and their families.

In May 1946, the National Bituminous Coal Wage Agreement established a health, welfare, and retirement fund backed up by a five-cents-per-ton levy on all coal produced by bituminous coal companies.

From the 1950s to the 1970s, there were various updates to the agreement with the goal to completely satisfy miners enough to end random wildcat strikes throughout coal mines across the country. By 1974, the coal industry led the country for the rate of work stoppages in a year, ten times the rate in other industries.

On December 6, 1974, a new National Bituminous Coal Wage Agreement resulted in the development of four separate trust funds, replacing the single Welfare and Retirement Funds. The 1950 Benefit Pension Trust was created for workers retiring before 1976; the 1974 Pension Trust, for workers retiring after 1975; the 1950 Benefit Trust, provides medical and death benefits for workers retiring after 1975 and their dependents; and the 1974 Benefit Trust, providing medical and death benefits for workers retiring after 1975 and their dependents. These four funds operate collectively under the title Health and Retirement Funds.

Changes to the agreements in 1974 resulted in $5.57 billion worth of unfunded liabilities.

== Timeline of lobbying activity ==
year	spent on lobbying	paid to others
2015	$28,000	$30,000 to Forscey PLLC
2014	$208,728	$120,000 to Forscey and Stinson, $10,000 to Tauzin Consultants
2013	$722,288	$200,000 Forscey and Stinson, $200,000 Arent Fox LLP, $40,000 Tauzin Consultants
2012	$516,053	$200,000 Forscey and Stinson, $20,000 Arent Fox LLP, $35,000 Tauzin Consultants
2011	$376,683	
2010	$394,083	
2009	$431,411	
2008	$486,738	
2007	$160,000	
2006	$220,000	

The majority of this has been work on specific acts like the Safety acts, which deals with health benefits to miners, and other smaller health acts or protection bills like the Federal mine and health and safety act of 1977 which was created by the Mine Safety and Health Administration (MSHA) who deal with the BCOA on many accounts. The BCOA also works on an average of one land restoration act a year like the Crow Tribe Land Restoration Act which was passed in 2009.

== Bibliography ==
- United Mine Workers of America Members Ratify New Five-Year Agreement with The Bituminous Coal Operators Association. PR Newswire Association LLC, 2001.
- United mine workers of America. The New proposed contract between United Mine Workers of America and the Bituminous Coal Operators' Association. Place of publication not identified], 1978.
- Putney, B. (1935). Stabilization of the bituminous coal industry. Editorial research reports 1935 (Vol. II). Washington, DC: CQ Press. Retrieved from http://library.cqpress.com/cqresearcher/cqresrre1935072400
- "The Bituminous Coal Problem." Editorial Research Reports 1925, vol. III, CQ Press, 1925, p. 491. CQ Researcher, 20 Feb. 2018, library.cqpress.com/cqresearcher/cqresrre1925081500.
- “Union Mine Workers Vote to Approve New Contract with Murray Energy.” Charleston Gazette-Mail, 21 Nov. 2017, www.wvgazettemail.com/news/union-mine-workers-vote-to-approve-new-contract-with-murray/article_1f799654-97ea-5b22-85ea-e2fc241e68dc.html.
- “UMWA-BCOA Ratify New Agreement.” CA-Black-Transp, 6 July 2011, www.coalage.com/news/latest/1146-umwa-bcoa-ratify-new-agreement.html#.WqraHejwa00.
