= Gilbert Creek (West Virginia) =

Stream in West Virginia, U.S.

Coordinates: 37°36′45″N 81°52′01″W

Gilbert Creek is a stream in the U.S. state of West Virginia.

Gilbert Creek was named after Joseph Gilbert, an early settler.

== See also ==
- List of rivers of West Virginia
