= Curb Records =

American record label

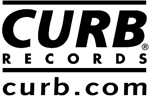
- Founded: 1964
- Founder: Mike Curb
- Distributors: MGM Records; (former); Word Records and Warner Records; (current; world except Australia); Sony Music; (current; Australia)
- Genre: Rock; country; country rock; pop; soul; gospel; soundtrack
- Country of origin: United States
- Location: Nashville, Tennessee
- Official website: curb.com

Curb Records (also known as Asylum-Curb and formerly known as MCG Curb) is an American record label started by Mike Curb, originally as Sidewalk Records in 1963. From 1969 to 1973, Curb merged with MGM Records where Curb served as President of MGM and Verve Records.

== History ==
Throughout the years, the Curb Companies have had major successes with such artists as the Stone Poneys (featuring Linda Ronstadt), Eric Burdon and War, Sammy Davis Jr., the Osmond Family (including Donny & Marie), Lou Rawls, Exile, the Righteous Brothers, Solomon Burke, Gloria Gaynor, the Hondells, the Arrows (featuring Davie Allan), Lyle Lovett, Roy Orbison, the Electric Flag (featuring Mike Bloomfield and Buddy Miles), the Sylvers, and the Four Seasons. The Four Seasons' comeback album, Who Loves You, included "December 1963 (Oh, What a Night)". It was the first single to spend more than one year on the Billboard Hot 100 Chart.

Curb's roster past and present includes Chet Atkins, Rodney Atkins, Kaci Battaglia, Bellamy Brothers, KMC Kru (hip-hop), Lee Brice, Sawyer Brown, Solomon Burke, Clark Family Experience, Sammy Davis Jr., Desert Rose Band, Exile, Family Force 5, Four Seasons, Gloria Gaynor, Lee Greenwood, Steve Holy, Wynonna Judd, The Judds, Hal Ketchum, Lyle Lovett, Ronnie McDowell, Tim McGraw, Jo Dee Messina, Roy Orbison, Lou Rawls, Righteous Brothers, LeAnn Rimes, Rio Grand, Neil Sedaka, T.G. Sheppard, Jim Stafford, Ray Stevens, Jonathan Thulin, Mel Tillis, Trick Pony (featuring Heidi Newfield), Hank Williams Jr. and Chris Young.

In late 2002, Curb Records also acquired a stake in Word Records from then-owners Time Warner. Warner Music Group sold its remaining stake in the label to Curb in 2016, making Word a wholly owned subsidiary, while Warner Music continues to distribute its output.

Four-time GMA Music Award Female Vocalist of the Year Natalie Grant is signed to Curb Records, in addition to the five-time GMA music award-winning group Selah. Throughout the years, Curb has had success with other Gospel music artists such as MercyMe, the Second Chapter of Acts, Degarmo and Key, Patti Cabrera, Michael English, Debby Boone, the Fisk Jubilee Singers, Barlowgirl, pureNRG, Worship Kids, Francesca Battistelli, Big Daddy Weave, Building 429, Fernando Ortega, Downhere, Nicole C. Mullen, Larry Norman, Jonathan Pierce, Plumb, Point of Grace, Group 1 Crew, Salvador, Jamie Slocum, Steller Kart, Jaci Velasquez and Mark Schultz.

In 2006, Curb launched a sister rock label Bruc Records, the name of which is an backronym for "Blues, Rock, Urban, Country" (the name is also "Curb" spelled backwards). Straight to Hell by Hank Williams III was the first album to be released on the new imprint.

In 2011, Curb filed a lawsuit against singer Tim McGraw alleging breach of contract, and McGraw filed a counter lawsuit against Curb. Early court rulings came down in favor of McGraw. In 2012, McGraw stopped recording with Curb, which had released all his albums and singles since 1990s, and switched to Big Machine Records.

In 2015, Jim Ed Norman was named CEO of the Curb Group. However, Mike Curb remains extremely involved as the founder and chairman of the board.

== Curb Foundation ==
Curb Records supports charitable programs through the Mike Curb Family Foundation. Some of the supported programs include: the Mike Curb Family Welcome Center at Second Harvest, Curb Youth Symphony, Curb Young Musicians Competition, Curb Concerto Competition, the Curb Family Humane Center, the Curb Junior Achievement Center in Los Angeles and Nashville, the Curb Family Pediatric Center, the Nashville Boy Scout Conference Center, the Patriots Theatre at Fort Campbell, the Curb Family Education Oasis Center and the Stella Curb Teacher Development Classrooms.

The Curb Foundation is very active in education including the Curb Center at Vanderbilt (which has launched the Curb Creative Campus Program), the Curb College for Music Business at Belmont University, the Curb College of Arts, Media and Communication at Cal State University Northridge, the Curb Beaman Jubilee Singers Chair at Fisk University, the Curb College of Arts, Music and Sciences at Daytona State College, the Business and Law Chair and Facility at Claremont McKenna College, the Curb Learning Lab for Music and Entertainment at Baylor University, the Curb Keller Dormitories at Neve Yerushalayim in Jerusalem University and the Curb History Institute at Rhodes College.

== Projects ==
In conjunction with Curb's educational projects, Curb has purchased and restored Elvis Presley's first home in Memphis, Tennessee, the Johnny Cash Museum in Nashville, Tennessee, the Historic RCA Studio B, and Columbia's Historic Quonset Hut (which was the first recording studio on Nashville's famed Music Row). These historic facilities were used by students, at the various Curb-supported colleges and universities, for the purpose of studying music history.

In October 2008, the 6,000 seat Curb Event Center at Belmont University in Nashville hosted the Town Hall Presidential debate between Senators John McCain and Barack Obama.

== Curb Records (Europe) ==
In the United Kingdom, Curb artists (apart from those sub-licensed to majors) are eligible for the UK 'independent' charts. In January 2006, Curb scored a Top 10 hit with Brian Kennedy and Peter Corry's Tribute to George Best, an EP featuring recordings of "You Raise Me Up". Curb previously had major hits in Europe with the Four Seasons, the Osmonds, LeAnn Rimes and soundtracks, such as Coyote Ugly.

== See also ==
- List of Curb Records artists
- Curb Racing
- Curb Agajanian Performance Group
