= Coal sludge spill =

Coal sludge spill may refer to:

- Buffalo Creek flood (February 26, 1972)
- Kingston Fossil Plant coal fly ash slurry spill (December 22, 2008)
- Martin County sludge spill (October 11, 2000)

== See also ==
- Hard coal spill on Bolinao (a spill from a barge on November 27, 2007)
