= Stephen A. Smith (environmentalist) =

American clean energy activist

Stephen Anderson Smith (born March 9, 1962) is an American environmentalist, clean energy advocate and peace activist. He was a former Democratic nominee for Tennessee's 2nd congressional district in the United States House Representatives in 1996. In 1988, Smith was a cofounder of the Foundation for Global Sustainability and the Oak Ridge Environmental Peace Alliance (OREPA). He is currently the Executive Director of the Southern Alliance for Clean Energy and the Southern Alliance for Clean Energy Action Fund.

== Early life and education ==
Stephen Smith was the second son of Rapahel Ford Smith III and Dorothy B. Smith. He was born in Boston, Massachusetts while his father was finishing his medical training at the Harvard Medical School. He spent his formative years in Pensacola, Florida and Nashville, Tennessee and currently lives in Knoxville, Tennessee. He graduated with a bachelor of science degree in biology and chemistry from Kentucky Wesleyan College in 1988 and a doctorate in veterinary medicine from the University of Tennessee in 1992. Smith volunteered as an environmental advocate while attending college and veterinary school. He left his veterinary practice to focus on environmental advocacy in 1999.

== Politics and activism ==
In 1988, Smith was a cofounder of the Oak Ridge Environmental Peace Alliance (OREPA) and the Foundation for Global Sustainability which later spawned the Tennessee Clean Water Network and Wild South. Smith while working with OREPA helped expose the environmental damage and radioactive contamination from nuclear weapons production at the Oak Ridge Nuclear Weapons Complex and advocated for the end of nuclear weapons production at the Oak Ridge Y-12 nuclear facility. In 1989, he was the lead author of the Citizen’s Guide to Oak Ridge detailing the extensive environmental damage for the general public. In 1990, Smith helped publicly document extensive contamination of TVA's Watts Bar Reservoir with over 75 metric tons of the heavy metal mercury, and radioactive cesium and plutonium from Oak Ridge’s historic operations.

Smith ran for political office in 1996, running for Tennessee’s 2nd congressional district against long time Republican Jimmy Duncan. A predominantly Republican leaning district, Smith was able to get the second highest percentage of votes of any of Duncan's Democratic opponents with almost 30%.

The Tennessee Valley Authority runs the Kingston Fossil Plant, a coal-fired power plant near Knoxville, where, in December 2008, billions of gallons of coal ash were spilled. This was the largest industrial spill in United States history. The toxic sludge covered 300 acres, destroyed three houses, and polluted the Emory and Tennessee rivers. Smith was asked to testify before the Senate Environment and Public Works committee at a hearing held on January 8, 2009. He testified that "The lack of regulation we have right now is unacceptable, and that is one of the reasons why this accident has happened." He also called for greater oversight of TVA and a better resource planning process.

In the November 2016 General Election, Florida had a solar ballot measure, heavily backed financially by the Florida utilities, which would have restricted the expansion of solar rooftop power. Smith and Floridians for Solar Choice led a grass-roots coalition to ultimately bring down the initiative that had $25 million in utility-company funding behind it. This coalition reached across party lines to join environmentalists, Tea Party free marketers, solar companies, and elected officials to defeat this proposal.

== Assignments ==
• Two terms on the Regional Energy Resource Council for TVA

• Tennessee Valley – Renewable Energy Information Exchange

• TVA’s Integrated Resource Plan Stakeholder Review Group

• TVA’s Green Power Marketing Team

• Regional Resource Stewardship Council

• Energy Vision 2020 Integrated Resource Plan Review Group

• Tennessee Energy Policy Council

== Initiatives ==
His current initiatives include pushing Florida to the number one position in rooftop solar, organizing energy efficiency initiatives for low income persons in Memphis, addressing risky nuclear activities, and supporting clean energy legislators throughout the southeast.
