= Toxic sludge spill =

Toxic sludge spill may refer to:

- Ajka alumina plant accident, in Ajka, Hungary on 4 October 2010.
- Kingston Fossil Plant coal fly ash slurry spill, in Roane County, Tennessee, United States on 21 December 2008.
- Martin County sludge spill, in Martin County, Kentucky, United States on 11 October 2000.
