= Martin County water crisis =

Water contamination event in Kentucky

The Martin County water crisis is an on-going public health crisis that began in 2000, when a coal slurry spill contaminated the area's water supply with cancer-causing disinfection byproducts and coliform bacteria. Residents report the water having a strong smell of chlorine, discoloration, odd taste, sediment and irritation/burning when in contact with skin. The contamination was caused by the spillage of approximately 300 million gallons of arsenic and mercury concentrated coal sludge into an abandoned underground mine and two tributaries of the Tug Fork River by local coal company Massey Energy Company on October 11, 2000. According to the Environmental Protection Agency (EPA), the spill was one of the worst environmental disasters ever in the southern United States.

In 2001, the EPA ordered Massey to help rehabilitate the impaired sections of Martin County. This rehabilitation included paying $46 million for the cleanup, $3.5 million in state fines, and an undisclosed amount to residents who sued the company. MCC had to pay $3.25 million in penalties and damages to Kentucky, which was the largest mining-related fine in the history of the state. After the spill, the water system was found in disarray and root and branch reforms were needed to repair the damaged infrastructure and water management systems; however, since the incident, no meaningful investments have been made while increasing the service area of provision of contaminated water. As a result, water outages and line breaks are recurrent, causing the residents of Martin County to resort to either bottled water or having to boil it for safety. Moreover, the price for the contaminated water has had a history of steady increase due to the extensive treatment needed, yet the fact that Martin County is one of the poorest counties in the United States, has made it inaccessible for some of the residents. Jack Spadaro, a previous director of the National Mine Health and Safety Academy (NMHSA), led an investigation on the spill and revealed that Martin County Coal (MCC), a subsidiary of Massey, had a past spill in 1994, and knew that another break was almost inevitable. Spadaro also argued that the MCC could have, but did nothing to prevent this break, even adding several feet of sludge to the sludge pond between 1994 and the 2000 spill.

In December 2018, a yearlong study of the county's water was instigated by University of Kentucky researchers, and members of Martin County Concerned Citizens (MCCC). This study revealed that the drinking water consistently exceeded the U.S. EPA maximum contamination levels for cancer-causing disinfection byproducts and coliform bacteria, with 47% of the 97 samples taken from Martin County households containing at least one contaminant, and 13% containing the bacteria. The MCCC conducted a survey with the owners of the households above, and revealed that only 12% of respondents said they drank the tap water.

== Timeline ==
- May 23, 1994- About 342 acre-feet of water in excess of allowable water quality standards flowed from a coal slurry refuse impoundment into Wolf Creek through abandoned mine shafts in the area.
- August 18, 1994- A revision that proposes a seepage barrier to be built by Martin County Coal Corporation is passed.
- October 7, 1999- Concerns are expressed about the stability of the mine shafts underneath the slurry impoundment.
- October 11, 2000- At about 2:00 A.M., approximately 250 million gallons of coal fine refuse slurry are released into the Wolf Creek and Rockcastle Creek watersheds. This is caused by a breach in an underground mine adjacent to Martin County Coal Company's refuse impoundment.
- October 11, 2000- Nearly all aquatic life in the creeks is killed due to suffocation by the slurry.
- October 12–16, 2000- Martin County Coal Company constructs filter dams in Wolf Creek and Rockcastle Creek to manage the flow of the coal slurry.
- October 17, 2000- Schools are closed to preserve water.
- October 25, 2000- Louisa, KY completes a water pipe upstream to supply residents. Advisories about the safety of drinking water are lifted.
- December 17, 2000- Cleanup of coal slurry is no longer represented as an emergency, and as a result EPA presence is removed from the area.
- October 17, 2001- The Department of Labor Mine Safety and Health Administration publishes a report on the Martin County Coal Company's failure to comply with previous provisions which led to the disaster.
- 2002- Massey Energy, the parent company of Martin County Coal Company, settles to pay 3.25 million dollars in damages to the state of Kentucky, after reportedly paying 46 million dollars on cleanup.
- June 4, 2003- Whistleblower Jack Spadaro is placed on involuntary administrative leave after his role in the investigation of MCCC and MSHA, which furthers Martin County resident's distrust of the government and water supply.
- April 11, 2005- The documentary “Sludge” is released, telling the story of the sludge spill and its effects on the people of Appalachia.
- August 7, 2006- The CDC publishes a report concluding that the slurry spill produced no adverse health affects on the people of Martin County, and that any water contamination was caused by a change of source rather than contamination by the slurry.
- December 22, 2018- Country music singer Tyler Childers distributes water to Martin County residents, bringing attention to the water crisis.
- 2000–present-Despite assurances from the EPA, CDC, and MCCC, residents of Martin County report distrust of the tap water in the area. About 96% of residents rely on bottled water for drinking.

== Background ==
Martin County is a community in eastern Kentucky with a current population of approximately 11,195 people. The people of this county have been struggling to survive due to heavily contaminated water for the last several decades. The contamination can be traced back to an incident in October 2000. A local subsidiary of Massey Energy was mining coal in the area for energy production. The byproduct of the energy production process is a black sludge substance which contains high levels of arsenic, lead, mercury, and other industrial pollutants. This substance is very hard to dispose of so it was being stored in a 72-acre coal slurry impoundment pond. Underneath the pond was an abandoned coal mine which collapsed under the pressure. The contents of the pond poured through the mine tunnels and exited directly into two large water supplies. Over 300 million gallons of sludge flowed into two county streams, Goldwater Creek and Wolf Creek. These empty into the Tug Fork River which is the source for the county's drinking water. This leads to even more damage past just the water quality. Residents’ yards were flooded with the thick, black paste which destroyed everything in its path. Wildlife in Wolf and Goldwater Creek was exterminated, including an estimated 1.6 million fish. After the spill, the coal companies responsible and the EPA told residents that their drinking water was safe. They claimed the local water filtration plant was able to remove the harmful contaminants. However, it was later revealed that the plant's filters were not washed properly and some of the filter control valves were not fully functional. This has caused many of the residents to be distrusting of water quality authorities and as a result they choose not to use tap water because they do not believe it is safe. Now, only 12% of the county uses water from the tap. After it was found that the water system was failing, recommendations were made for reform to fix the broken infrastructure and the poor management. However, the utility failed to come through on those recommendations. Due to this, pipes and pumps have frequent line breaks and outages. Line breaks cause risk of contamination like harmful bacteria and brown water. Some of the household bills show over 50,000 gallons of water being used which is four times the national average. This is directly linked with the water district's leakage problem. Approximately 70% of Martin County's water is lost because of leaking pipes. About 97% of the country's 153,000 public drinking water systems serve 10,000 people or less. The reservoir is littered with empty liquor bottles and used syringes, and only one of the three water clarifying tanks is actually even fully functional. Local officials are trying to fix all that which has caused water rates to go up by 41% last year alone. Twenty years later the inhabitants of Martin County are still struggling to live in their environment of fear, distrust, and pollution.

== Early contamination ==
The hygiene of the water in Martin County has been a concern since a coal slurry spill contaminated the water supply in 2000. The spill was a result of a mining accident that occurred on October 11 when the bottom of a coal slurry impoundment owned by Massey Energy cracked under pressure and sent an enormous amount of coal slurry into an abandoned underground mine. After entering the mine, an estimated 306-million gallons of slurry found its way to two tributaries of the Tug Fork River. Shortly after, nearby creeks were filled with the black, gooey waste. The slurry contained mercury, arsenic, and several other harmful chemicals. This killed almost all local aquatic life and harmed many species that depended on the nearby water sources. The spill stretched across over 200 miles of the Big Sandy River and made its way to the Ohio River. Thus, the water supply for over 27,000 residents was compromised. It remains one of the worst environmental disasters to strike the southeastern United States, according to the Environmental Protection Agency (EPA). Almost a year after the spill in 2001, the EPA ordered Massey Energy to restore the streams and waterways affected by the spill. However, even with supervision from the EPA and numerous efforts to try to mitigate the damage, the water supply is still compromised two decades later. Martin County residents are still finding slurry and/or sludge in the surface waters of the county. After a large coal fly ash slurry spill in 2008, slurry pond regulations have been made by the Mine Safety and Health Administration to prevent spills like this one and the Martin County coal slurry spill in the future. The administration has also issued annual checks on mining impoundment areas by mining engineers and increased staff training on preventive measures of another spill.

Massey Energy company was fined $5,600 by the federal government for the spill. The rest of the investigation on the company was suspended after George W. Bush was elected. This is thought to be caused by Massey Energy being a large contributor to the Republican Party. A whistleblower, Jack Spadaro, released information that the Bush administration was purposefully covering up the Martin County spill. After this, many residents of Martin County were outraged.

== Studies ==
After the spill on October 11, 2000, the coal companies responsible for the spill as well as the Environmental Protection Agency stated that the water was safe to drink for Martin County residents and that the water filtration plant removed all harmful contaminants. A later undisclosed report found that many of the filter control valves were not functional and that many of the filters were not washed properly.

The Kentucky State Government began an investigation of their own. In 2002 the Kentucky Public Service Commission (PSC) began an investigation into the “district’s ability to provide adequate and reasonable service”. They identified 43 areas in Martin County's Water District that needed improvement. When the PSC returned to Martin County for another investigation in 2006, they concluded that many of their recommendations were ignored and not implemented. They issued 35 more recommendations, bringing the total number to 78 areas of improvement with the water district since the 2002 investigation. The PSC returned once again to Martin County in 2014, they found that there were still 37 uncompleted corrective measures and recommendations. They also found several issues in Martin County Water's recordkeeping and issued recommendations to fix those issues. The PSC opened another investigation in 2016. They claimed that Martin County's loss rate was around 60% in recent years, which meant that “six out of every 10 gallons the utility produces or purchases are unaccounted for and not reflected in metered usage.” The rate is also more than quadruple what is permitted with Kentucky's guidelines. They also claim that Martin County Water has failed to implement numerous remedial actions required after the 2006 investigation, including a comprehensive plan to reduce water loss, implementing a preventative maintenance program and improving financial management.”

On July 31st, 2020, a study conducted by Jason Unrine and Wayne Sanderson, both Professors at the College of Agriculture at the University of Kentucky, found that the county’s drinking water “regularly exceeded U.S. Environmental Protection Agency maximum contamination levels for cancer-causing disinfection byproducts and coliform bacteria”. The study found that nearly all Martin County residents reported problems with their drinking water, some of their complaints include odor, appearance, taste, and pressure. The study found that only 12% of respondents drink the tap water from the water plant. They also found that 47% of the water samples had “at least one contaminant that exceeded U.S. EPA regulatory guidelines.” 10% of the water samples had above the EPA's maximum level of haloacetic acids, and 29% of the water samples had above the EPA's maximum level of total trihalomethanes. The samples with the above maximum levels of haloacetic acids were more likely to be further away from the water treatment plant. The researchers also found that 13% of the water samples detected coliform bacteria, which can indicate that there are harmful bacteria in the water. However, the researchers did not find any levels of E.Coli in the samples. There were higher levels of coliform bacteria during the summer and early autumn months.

== Investigations ==
Ongoing investigations since 2000 have shown that the Martin County water supply is still a major issue within the region and drinking water is neither safe nor affordable. Shortly after the initial coal slurry in 2000, Martin County residents were informed by both the EPA and coal companies responsible that their water was safe to drink due to a brief investigation into the water filtration plant. However, a water plant inspection report that occurred at the same time found that the water filters and control valves were not properly taken care of. However, this report was undisclosed. In 2002 the Kentucky state government launched an investigation that resulted in forty-three problems being addressed in the Martin County water supply. However, subsequent relaunches of this investigation in 2006 and 2016 into the MCWD's operations found that the MCWD had failed to implement any solutions to the forty-three problems and had not taken steps to improve drinking water infrastructure. In 2016 the "Martin County Water Warriors" was founded as a result of the Flint Michigan water crisis and aimed to investigate water issues in the region and spread awareness about water leaks through social media. In 2018, a rate increase in drinking water prompted an investigation by the Appalachian Citizens’ Law Center & Martin County Concerned Citizens. While this rate increase was approved by city regulators so long as Martin County hired a professional outside manager for expertise, this caused a sequence of economic problems for residents. In the drinking water affordability report, headed by Mary Cromer and Nicki Draper, a 41.5% increase in water service cost was noted to have occurred since January 2018, with more rate increases expected. This was reported along with the finding that 18.1% of Martin County households with an income of less than $10,000 had water burden levels well above the EPA's affordability threshold. In addition, it was noted that significant water loss had been occurring in treatment plants such that it was affecting water affordability greatly. Safety issues were also outlined in this report, as a University of Kentucky study found unsafe levels of trihalomethane and coliform bacteria in 15-20% of homes studied. In June 2019, an investigation by the Kentucky Attorney General was launched in order to potentially charge individuals on the Martin County water district board with misappropriation of money, theft of grant money, and potentially receiving free water. However, this investigation returned none of these charges. Martin County's 2020 CCR report did not find any violations in water contaminants, after investigating potential sources of roads, bridges, culverts, and oil and gas pipelines. After an investigation in 2021, residents of the Martin County Water District received letters noting that their system had violated a drinking water requirement. The water was found to have spiked turbidity levels due to a flood, and the system was unable to react to this large issue. The water is still deemed safe, ].

== Political responses ==
=== Federal government ===
On October 12, 2000, Massey Energy spilled more than 300 million gallons of coal slurry, sparking an investigation by the Mine Safety and Health Administration (MSHA). At the time, Senator Mitch McConnell's wife, Elaine Chao, ran the MSHA. The company received a fine of $5,600 for the accident in 2002. The investigation was meant to continue past this point but was ended prematurely by the Bush administration when they entered office. There is speculation that the rapid closure of the case was because of the contributions Massey Energy gave to the Republican Party

Jack Spadaro, an engineer at Massey Energy, came forward when the investigation ended. He went to the public to expose that another coal spill occurred in 1994, and problems persisted until the spill in 2000. No information regarding the original spill was released to the public. The Bush Administration placed him on forced administrative leave, searched his office for evidence of the accident, then concluded that the case should be closed and discarded the evidence.

On September 9, 2019, Congressman Hal Rogers of the 5th district of Kentucky announced that Martin County will receive $7.23 million in federal grants for critical water system improvements and improved economic development opportunities. They received $2 million from the Abandoned Mines Lands (AML) pilot program to improve water supply infrastructure and address current water problems and $2 million from the U.S. Army Corps of Engineers to improve water service. Then an additional $3.37 million from the AML to facilitate economic and business growth in the area.

=== State legislature ===
On March 4, 2020, House Resolution 122 was introduced to the Kentucky House of Representatives, urging Governor Andy Beshear to declare a State of Emergency in Martin County, Kentucky, and make emergency funds available to resolve the county's water crisis. The same resolution later was introduced to the Standing Committee of Natural Resources & Energy (H).

On April 1, 2021, the American Rescue Plan Act invested 1 billion dollars in many issues affecting Martin County, especially drinking water. These efforts to improve access to drinking water in Martin County are estimated to provide roughly 3,800 jobs statewide.

On June 1, 2021, Andy Beshear announced the Better Kentucky program that would include $250 million allocated for developing water infrastructure across Kentucky. $150 million worth of these funds were delegated amongst the counties based on their population; Martin County received $411,000.

=== Water rates ===
In 2018, the Martin County Water District requested a 49.5% increase in the water rates. The Kentucky Public Service Committee (PSC) refused this request due to the water system's high water loss rate. The PSC instead gave two orders to increase the water rates. The first of these orders came on March 16, 2018, and granted an emergency rate increase of 26.5% and included an additional fee of $4.19 to help pay off the debt the water district faced. The second order came on November 5, 2018, where the PSC raised rates another 25.72%. In all, the rates increased by 41.5%.

On July 9, 2021, an additional emergency rate increase was proposed by the Martin County Water District and approved by the PSC. This proposal increased the rates further by 11.68%. Without increasing the water rates, the Martin County Water District would shut down operations or enter into receivership.

Part of the problem was that previous water commissioners were not willing to raise the rates when it was needed. When the costs rose with the process of treating water. This was a big issue as to why there was a such a high rate increase.

=== Other responses ===
Citizens Responses: The citizens of Martin County heavily rely on their bottled water for drinking and tap water for cooking. According to a study at the University of Kentucky, 96% of Martin County residents rely on bottled water for drinking, and 56% of residents use tap water for cooking. With the fear and uncertainty in Martin County's water, its citizens responded by not drinking the water due to their fear and uncertainty of their health and safety. Martin County resident Florene Reed says, “It makes you sick to my stomach, I would never let my baby drink it, it smells bad and it tastes bad. It’s nasty, but sometimes I have no choice.” The common response from the Martin County citizens is, “It smells bad, it tastes bad". The people are beyond frustrated and upset with their water drinking situation and struggle to even pay for their water that they cannot even drink, which is a huge issue considering about 40% of Martin County's estimated 12,000 are living in poverty.

Group Responses: Citizens of Martin County who were passionate about putting an end to the situation have assembled Facebook groups of people who wanted to make a change to their contaminated water. These groups were known as the Water Warriors and Martin County Concerned Citizens. These groups were developed after the Flint Water Crisis made headlines in 2016. The Water Warriors would share images and stories about containment and outages leaks while the Martin County Concerned Citizens persuaded the Kentucky State Regulator to give ordinary and regulator citizens a role in holding the water department accountable. Media Responses:

Media Responses: In a News report from Newsy a citizen from Martin County, Nina McCoy, is interviewed about her personal experience with the water crisis. Once Martin County suffered from the environmental disaster that caused them to have unsafe water occurred, organizations such as the EPA and the Frankfort Water Department came to inspect Martin County's water. According to Nina, both of those organizations said their water looked fine and blew off the situation. Nina states that what finally got them the attention they deserved was when there were so many broken pipes that people would start to run out of water for days and even weeks. The people suffering have already given up on drinking water, they only use their water to cook, clean, and wash dishes, and now, they do not even have that luxury. Host of Kentucky Sports Radio (KSR), Matt Jones, showed a huge interest in the Martin County water crisis. On his Twitter he stated, “There is clearly a concerted effort by someone in Martin County to keep us out tomorrow...which of course only makes me want to go there more...KSR will Be LIVE in Martin County tomorrow no matter what, even if we have to do it outside". This proves anyone who is passionate about Kentucky cares about the struggles that the citizens of Martin County are going through and that they want to help them out in any way that is possible.

== Coverage ==
On October 2, 2018, Mary Cromer of Appalachian Citizens Law Center Inc. and Ricki Draper of Martin County Concerned Citizens Inc. released a twenty one page report over the water crisis. This report was then covered by local media including local public radio, as well as by Morning Edition on NPR, and by the Associated Press. On December 22, 2018, country artist and Lawrence county native, Tyler Childers personally delivered 500 cases of bottled water to Martin County and gave a heartfelt speech touching on the cancer rates, opioid crisis and his memories of clean water issues from his youth. He went on to point out the injustice of how eastern Kentuckians have "carried corporations into the future" while having water that "isn’t fit for dogs to bathe in, let alone your children." Many news outlets statewide wrote about his actions which sparked a state-wide demand for change. On November 12, 2019, Maanasa Manchikanti wrote about how a participant of the Community Leadership Institute of Kentucky (CLIK), Ricki Draper, has started receiving national attention for the report she co-wrote in 2018. It also goes on to update that now Draper is focusing on the water affordability crisis in Martin County, which she says has received no coverage because of the local and national focus on the water quality issue. On August 22, 2020, Visa News's article "Martin County, Kentucky’s Water Crisis Isn’t Over. But It Has Changed." provided the most up-to-date summary of the crisis, encompassing not only the progress in water quality issues, but the rising problem of water affordability and the ongoing political issues surrounding the water crisis.

== See also ==
- Flint water crisis
- Water scarcity
- Martin County coal slurry spill
