= Massey Energy =

American coal company (1920–2011)

Massey Energy Co.
- Type: Public company
- Traded as: NYSE: MEE
- Industry: Coal
- Founded: 1920 in Richmond, Virginia
- Fate: Acquired by Alpha Natural Resources (2011)
- Headquarters: Richmond, Virginia, U.S.
- Key people: Baxter Phillips, President and CEO; Christopher Adkins, SVP & COO; John Poma, VP & CAO; Shane Harvey, VP & General Counsel
- Revenue: US$2.69 billion (2009)
- Net income: US$104.4 million (2009)
- Number of employees: approx. 5,850
- Website: www.alphanr.com

Massey Energy Company was a coal extractor in the United States with substantial operations in West Virginia, Kentucky and Virginia. By revenue, it was the fourth largest producer of coal in the United States and the largest coal producer in Central Appalachia. By coal production weight, it was the sixth largest producer of coal in the United States.

Massey's mines yielded around 40 million tons of coal annually. The company controlled 2.3 billion tons of proven and probable coal reserves in Southern West Virginia, Eastern Kentucky, Southwest Virginia and Tennessee or about a third of all Central Appalachian reserves. It employed approximately 5,850 people, and operated 35 underground mines and 12 surface mines.

Massey Energy owned and operated Upper Big Branch Mine where 29 miners were killed in April 2010. The Mine Safety and Health Administration found that the company's culture of favoring production over safety contributed to flagrant safety violations that caused the coal dust explosion. On December 6, 2011 the Mine Safety and Health Administration announced a $10,825,368 levy against Massey, the largest monetary penalty imposed by the agency in history.

The resulting $10.8 million in total was from 369 citations and orders. Following Alpha Natural Resources' acquisition, Alpha additionally settled Massey's potential criminal liabilities for $209 million.

In January 2011, it was announced that Massey Energy company would be bought by competitor Alpha Natural Resources for $7.1 billion. More than 99% of Massey shareholders and 98% of Alpha shareholders voted in favor of the acquisition and courts in Delaware and West Virginia agreed with the shareholders' vote.

== History ==
A.T. Massey incorporated the A.T. Massey Coal Company in 1920 as a coal brokering business in Richmond, Virginia, and served as the company's first president. A.T. Massey acquired its first mining operation in 1945 and expanded its business to include coal mining and processing. Five generations of the Massey family headed the company, including Evan Massey in 1945, William E. Massey in 1962, and E. Morgan Massey in 1972.

St. Joe Minerals acquired controlling interest in A.T. Massey in 1974. Six years later, St. Joe Minerals sold 50% of its interest in A. T. Massey to Royal Dutch Shell, forming the Massey Coal Partnership to run the company. In 1981, the Fluor Corporation acquired St. Joe Minerals. In 1984, the United Mine Workers of America went on strike against A.T. Massey, sparking a series of confrontations documented in the film Mine War on Blackberry Creek. Fluor and Royal Dutch Shell dissolved the Massey Coal Partnership in 1987, with each entity assuming ownership of half of the operations. Fluor changed the name of the operations it owned back to A. T. Massey Coal Company, initiating a period of significant growth through acquisitions.

In 1992, Don Blankenship was appointed President, Chairman and CEO of A.T. Massey Coal Company; he served as the Chairman and CEO of Massey for 18 years. Blankenship oversaw continued company growth, including several more acquisitions and the establishment of several subsidiaries.

A.T. Massey completed a reverse spin-off from Fluor Corporation in 2000 and was renamed Massey Energy Company. As of 2010, Massey Energy produced, processed, and sold bituminous coal of steam and metallurgical grades, primarily of low sulfur content, through its 22 processing and shipping centers, called "resource groups," many of which received coal from multiple coal mines.

On Dec. 31, 2010, longtime CEO Don Blankenship stepped down, and was replaced as CEO by Massey President Baxter F. Phillips Jr.

=== Sale of Massey to Alpha ===
On June 1, 2011, shareholders of Alpha Natural Resources agreed to buy Massey Energy for $7.1 billion, making it the nation's largest metallurgical coal company. Some shareholder groups had tried to block the sale claiming that Massey managers had engineered the sale of the company to protect themselves from liabilities and had arranged new management jobs with Alpha.

== Board of directors ==
- Baxter F. Phillips Jr., president and CEO, Massey Energy
- James B. Crawford, former chairman and CEO, James River Coal Company
- General Robert H. Foglesong, retired four-star general, U.S. Air Force
- Richard M. Gabrys, former vice chairman, Deloitte & Touche LLP
- Robert B. Holland, former director, Financial Guaranty Insurance Corporation
- Admiral Bobby Inman, former director, National Security Agency
- Dan R. Moore, chairman, Moore Group, Inc.
- Stanley C. Suboleski, former commissioner, Federal Mine Safety and Health Review Commission
- Linda J. Welty, former president and Chief Operating Officer, H. B. Fuller and Flint Ink

In response to a prolonged citizen campaign on the environment, on May 29, 2009 Ohio State University President E. Gordon Gee announced his resignation from the Board of Massey Energy. Gee had said he believed he could do more environmental good on the board than off it.

== Location ==
There are 23 coal mining sites run by Massey Energy. There are 16 sites located in West Virginia, five in Kentucky, and one in Virginia. The organization's headquarters was located in Richmond, VA. Locations in West Virginia: Delbarton, Elk Run, Greun Valley, Guyandotte, Independence, Logan, County, Mammoth, Marfork, Nicholas Energy, Progress Energy, Rawl, Republic Energy, and Stirrat. Locations in Kentucky: Long Fork, Martin County, New Ridge, and Sidney. Locations in Virginia: Knox Creek.

== Environmental and safety record ==
In January 2008, the company agreed to a $20 million settlement with the U.S. Environmental Protection Agency (EPA) to resolve thousands of violations of the Clean Water Act for routinely polluting waterways in Kentucky and West Virginia with coal slurry and wastewater. Although this was the largest Clean Water Act settlement, the violations were estimated to have fines on the order of $2.4 billion.

=== Martin County coal slurry spill ===
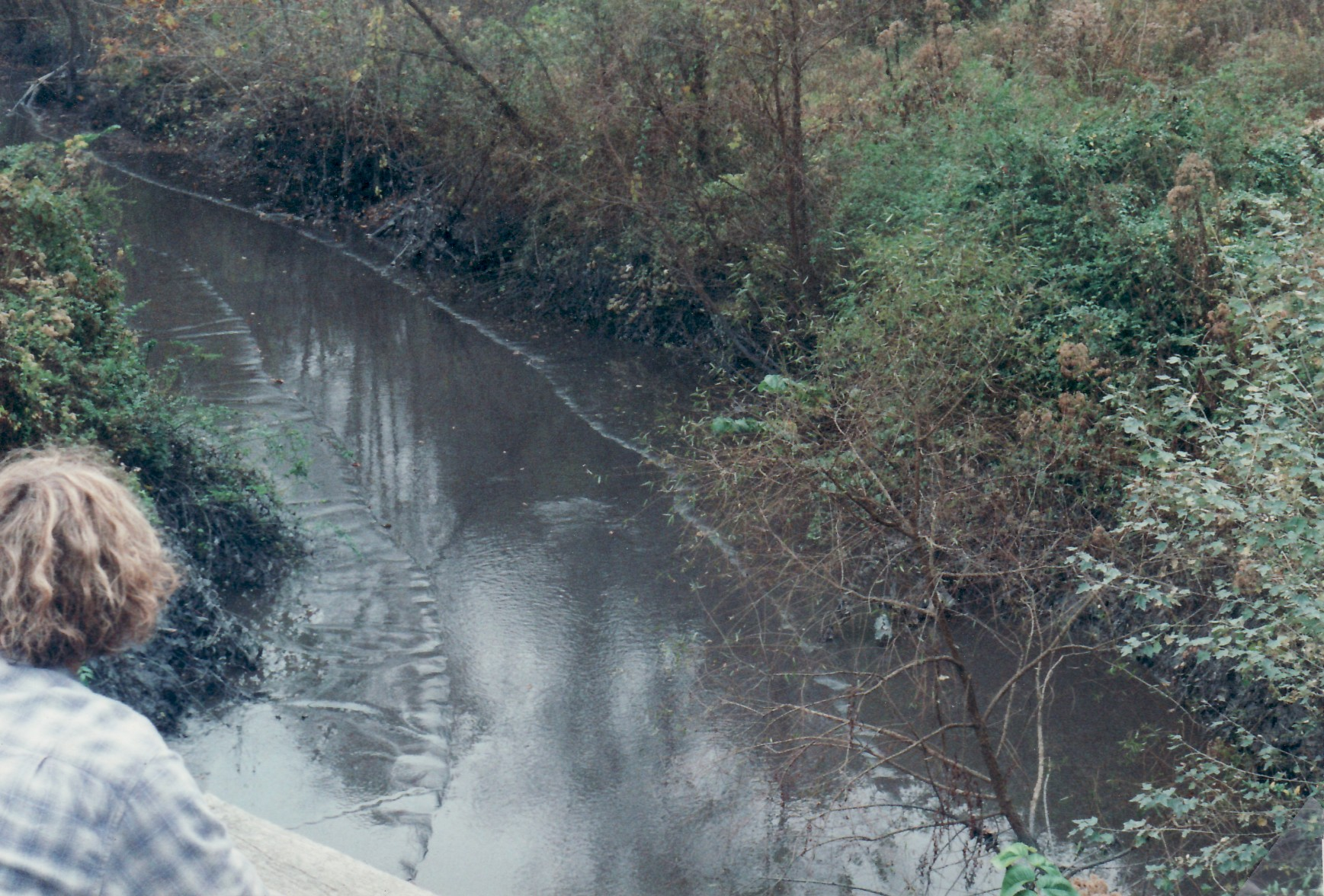
Wolf Creek, October 22, 2000

In October 2000, a coal slurry impoundment owned by Martin County Coal Company, a Massey Energy subsidiary in Martin County, Kentucky, suddenly breached into an abandoned mine below it and released over 200 million gallons of coal slurry into two mountain streams, Coldwater Creek and Wolf Creek. The Martin County coal slurry spill was called the worst ever environmental disaster in the southeastern United States by the EPA. The spill smothered all aquatic life in the streams and left residents with contaminated drinking water. Cleanup costs for the spill were approximately $50 million.

=== Aracoma Alma Mine accident ===
On January 19, 2006, a belt line fire killed miners Don I. Bragg, 33, and Ellery Elvis Hatfield, 47, at Massey's Aracoma Alma Number 1 Mine in Logan County, West Virginia. Efforts to fight the fire were hampered by inadequate fire extinguishers, fire hose couplings which did not match the water line, and a lack of water in the lines. On December 22, 2008, Massey Energy agreed to pay $4.2 million in civil and criminal penalties for the accident. It is the largest financial settlement in the coal industry's history. The Charleston (WV) Gazette reported on January 15, 2009 that Aracoma widows Delorice Bragg and Freda Hatfield urged U.S. District Judge John T. Copenhaver to reject Massey's plea bargain and fine for the accident. Widow Bragg stated that it was clear "that Massey executives expected the Alma Mine to emphasize production over the safety of the coal miners inside."

=== Mine safety violations ===
On February 1, 2006, bulldozer operator Paul K. Moss, 58, of Sissonville, West Virginia died when his machine ruptured a 16-inch (410 mm) natural gas line at Elk Run Coal Co.'s Black Castle surface mine. The bulldozer was immediately engulfed in flames. According to the Mine Safety and Health Administration report, operator Moss exited the cab but his body was found behind the blade. Massey Energy was fined $2.5 million after a federal judge accepted the company's guilty plea to 10 criminal charges for the fire. A U.S. District approved a plea deal despite a provision sparing Massey officials and the Richmond, Va., coal company from prosecution. The agreement also required Aracoma to pay a $1.7 million fine for civil violations found by the federal Mine Safety and Health Administration.

On October 8, 2008, Steven Cain, 32, of Comfort, West Virginia was killed at Massey Energy's Independence Coal Justice No. 1 Mine when he was crushed by a railcar. A Mine Safety and Health Administration report concludes Cain was killed because Massey managers assigned him a dangerous job, although he had “little mining experience and minimal training.”

In 2009, the federal Mine Safety and Health Administration cited Massey Energy's Upper Big Branch coal mine for 495 violations and proposed $911,802 in fines.

=== Upper Big Branch mine disaster ===
On April 5, 2010, an explosion at Massey owned Performance Coal Co. mine in Montcoal, West Virginia resulted in the deaths of 29 miners. The explosion, which has become known as the Upper Big Branch Mine disaster, is the worst mining disaster in 40 years, with a greater loss of life than in any mining accident since the 1970s. The federal Mine Safety and Health Administration (MSHA) released its final report on December 6, 2011, concluding that flagrant safety violations contributed to a coal dust explosion. It issued 369 citations at that time, assessing $10.8 million in penalties. Investigators also noted the historical record of safety violations at the Upper Big Branch mine, which amassed more than 1,100 violations in the past three years, many of them serious, including 50 of them in March 2010 for violations including improper ventilation of methane and poor escape routes. Federal regulators had ordered portions of the mine closed 60 times over the year preceding the explosion. It was claimed, that the FBI had launched a probe investigating the possible bribery of federal officials overseeing mining industry regulation by Massey Energy.

== Protests ==
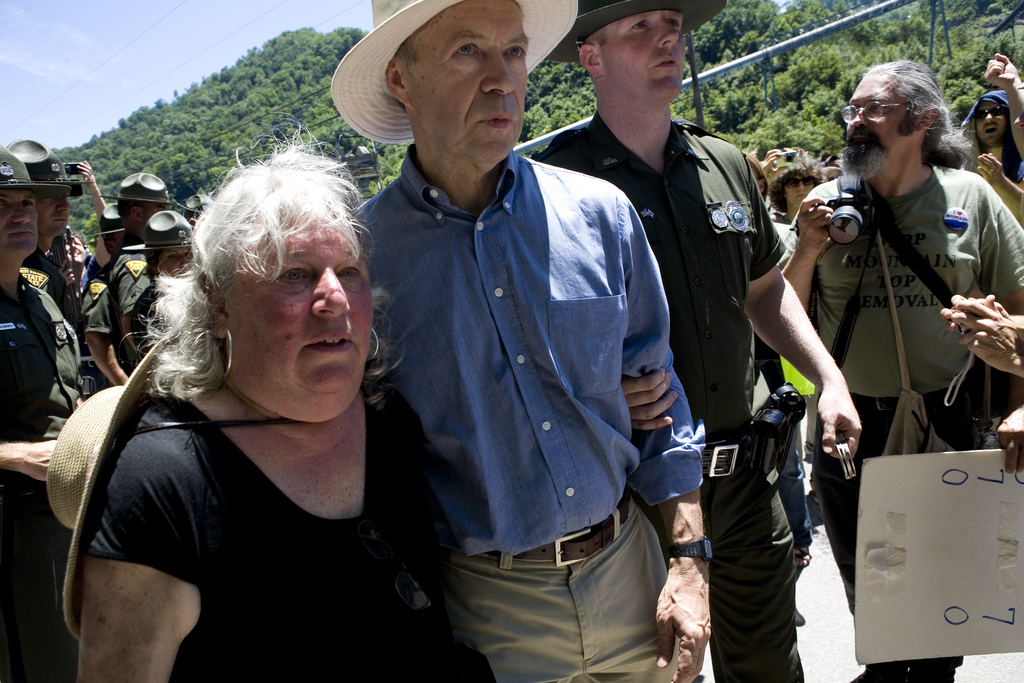
Susan Rosenberg and Dr. James Hansen were arrested June 23, 2009, at the gates of Massey Energy-operated Goals Coal Company. At least 15 people were arrested protesting mountaintop removal coal mining in Appalachia.

In June 2009, a Raleigh County judge granted a preliminary injunction to block anti-mountaintop removal activists from further protests on some Massey Energy sites.

== Court rulings ==
In 1998, Hugh Caperton filed a lawsuit against A.T. Massey Coal Company alleging that Massey fraudulently canceled a coal supply contract with Harman Mining, resulting in its going out of business. In 2007, when the case came before the West Virginia Supreme Court, Caperton petitioned for Justice Benjamin to recuse himself. Benjamin declined and was ultimately part of the 3 to 2 majority that overturned the jury's $50 million verdict. In November 2008, the United States Supreme Court agreed to hear the appeal. Wal-Mart, PepsiCo, Intel Corporation, Lockheed Martin, Common Cause and Public Citizen filed briefs in the case urging the United States Supreme Court to reject the West Virginia Supreme Court's decision. The briefs contended that Justice Brent Benjamin was biased in the case. On June 8, 2009, The US Supreme Court agreed 5–4, sending the case back to the West Virginia Supreme Court, and forcing Justice Benjamin to recuse himself from the case. The New York Times opined that the case involved "egregious ethical myopia" on the part of Justice Benjamin.

In February 2003, a judge ordered Massey to pay the residents of Sylvester, West Virginia $473,000 to settle complaints that coal dust from Massey's Elk Run Processing Plant had caused health problems and lowered property values in the nearby town. In addition, the payment to the residents of Sylvester, Massey Energy was ordered to construct a cloth dome over their coal processing plant to reduce the dust.

On September 16, 2004, a civil jury ordered Massey to pay $1.54 million in damages to 245 residents of Mingo County, W. Va., who lost their water wells after Massey had mined beneath the homes. The jury concluded that Massey acted “with malicious, willful, wanton, reckless or intentional disregard for plaintiffs’ rights.”

In 2005, Wheeling, W.Va.-based steelmaker Wheeling-Pittsburgh Steel sued Virginia-based Massey Energy claiming Massey failed to deliver on a contract of 104,000 tons of coal monthly. In July 2007, a Circuit Court in Brooke County, W.Va. upheld the jury award of more than $267 million, including accrued interest. Massey appealed the case to the US Supreme Court, which declined to hear the appeal in December 2008.

In 2005, some residents of Raleigh County, West Virginia, complained that Massey's Goals Coal Company was endangering the health and well-being of students at the adjacent Marsh Fork Elementary School. In July 2005, the West Virginia Division of Environmental Protection revoked a permit for construction of a coal silo near the school. However, some local employees and residents supported Massey Energy by arguing that the economic benefits received from the company outweigh the environmental impact to the area. 30 non-violent protestors were arrested, including actress Daryl Hannah, NASA climatologist James E. Hansen, and former West Virginia Congressman Ken Hechler. In June 2009, the West Virginia Supreme Court concluded that the Massey was allowed to build their second silo; "We therefore find that the circuit court did not err, and properly affirmed the decision of the West Virginia Surface Mine Board."

In December 2008, residents of Prenter, West Virginia filed a lawsuit claiming that underground slurry injection from a Massey coal facility, and other coal preparation plants, contaminated their underground water supply. On June 12, 2012, a confidential settlement was reached between Massey Energy and the residents of Prenter, West Virginia.

On Oct 30, 2009, Fayette County West Virginia Judge Paul Blake ruled in an age discrimination lawsuit that more than 200 miners who were not rehired after Massey Energy Co. bought a bankrupt West Virginia mine were entitled to a settlement of $8.75 million. The suit covers 229 miners, including 82 union miners. Massey has been ordered to rehire the miners. Under the terms of the settlement, the 82 union miners will each receive $38,000. The remaining miners will receive $19,000.

== Community service ==
Among Massey Energy's contributions to the community are an annual Christmas Extravaganza for local children, financial assistance to local schools, and $1 million in college and post-graduate scholarships. Massey co-sponsors the Appalachian Leadership and Education Foundation (ALEF) and in 1997 formed Doctors for our Communities with Marshall University, providing MD student loans that are waived if the recipient practices medicine for a minimum of seven years in Massey's operating region. The Massey Cancer Center of Virginia Commonwealth University is named in honor of William E. Massey for his financial endowment.

In 2005, Massey established the Family Wellness Center that offers medical services to employees' families in McDowell and Logan county in West Virginia, who often lack access to primary care physicians and health care facilities. A Harvard study found that these counties' life expectancies average among the 25 worst in the United States.

== See also ==
- Aracoma Alma Mine accident
- Martin County coal slurry spill
- Mountaintop removal
- Upper Big Branch Mine disaster
- Julia Bonds
