= CWSF =

CWSF may refer to:

- Central Washington State Fair, a state fair held in Yakima, Washington
- Canada-Wide Science Fair, a Canadian science fair
- Coal-water slurry fuel, a type of coal-based fuel
