= Jack Spadaro =

American mining engineer (born 1948)

- Born: October 11, 1948 (age 77); Mount Hope, West Virginia
- Occupations: Mine Health & Safety and Environmental Consultant
- Known for: Revealing details of oversight of United States government in relation to coal safety

Jack Spadaro (born October 11, 1948) is an American mining engineer. He is from West Virginia and is known for bringing attention to oversights of the government in relation to the Martin County coal slurry spill and whistleblowing on the subsequent downplaying of the role of the government and Massey Energy in the disaster.

== Early life ==
Jack Spadaro was born in West Virginia and graduated from Mount Hope High School in 1967. Under the guidance of an influential English teacher who was married to the head of the Bureau of Mines at that time, he received a scholarship to West Virginia University where he studied mining engineering.

== Career ==
Two years after graduation from college, Spadaro was teaching and doing research when, on February 26, 1972, the Buffalo Creek flood disaster occurred. Spadaro was one of the investigators called upon by Governor Arch Moore to investigate the matter. When Spadaro arrived he noticed workers pulling dead bodies from the mud. This inspired him to protect miners and regulate activity in those communities.

He began to uncover information that proved dams built across West Virginia had not used standard engineering methods. Vice president of Buffalo Mining Steve Dasovich said that during the construction of one dam on Buffalo Creek no engineering calculations were made. Nearly a decade later Spadaro joined the Department of Natural Resources and began building an inventory of dams and enforcing laws regulating coal waste and dam construction.

Spadaro spent his career overseeing environmental disasters and damage caused by coal mining. For 38 years he worked alongside companies, citizens, and many other organizations to combat hazards that correlate with coal mining incidents and processes. He worked as a Mine Safety and Health Administration consultant, providing assistance as an expert witness in cases that involved damage to the environment and mining incidents that affected workers. Spadaro has been a key trial witness due to his personal experience with large mining incidents.

== Martin County sludge spill ==
The Martin County sludge spill was an incident that Spadaro worked closely on. This coal slurry impoundment resulted from the Massey Energy Company's mining expeditions. He was asked to investigate the incident, working alongside colleagues to find the root of the impoundment failure. This investigation led to the discovery of a previous spill at the same spot. Accusations came amid claims that this problem had been fixed in the past. Through Spadaro's efforts and investigation, it was discovered that engineers were aware of the previous spill in 1994, and that the issue had been ongoing until it broke in October.

Spadaro came forward with viable evidence and sources stemming from his research. This information intended to show the origin of the spill. During this time, the Bush administration had a strong push for more energy, which led to the deregulation of energy companies. On June 4, 2003 government agents entered Spadaro’s office and went through his files. He was locked out and placed on administrative leave. Spadaro stated that the Bush administration was covering up the Martin County spill. Spadaro complained that the new administration had given lucrative contracts for work at the National Mine Health and Safety Academy to friends. The MSHA denied the accusations, while Spadaro claimed the program was divided into 186 smaller contracts.
