= Southern Alliance for Clean Energy =

American energy advocacy organization

- Abbreviation: SACE
- Formation: 1985; 41 years ago
- Headquarters: Knoxville, Tennessee
- Board President: E. Leon Jacobs, Jr.
- Executive Director: Stephen A. Smith
- Board of directors: E. Leon Jacobs, Jr.; Patricia San Pedro; Enid Sisskin, PhD; John Noel; Gary A. Davis; Bob Freeman; Pearl Walker
- Website: https://cleanenergy.org/
- Formerly called: Tennessee Valley Energy Coalition; Tennessee Valley Energy Reform Coalition

The Southern Alliance for Clean Energy (SACE) is a nonprofit advocacy group that promotes the use of sustainable energy in the southeastern United States. SACE’s primary focus states are Florida, Georgia, North Carolina, South Carolina, and Tennessee.

== History ==
Beginning in 1979, an informal group of citizens began to question the actions of the Tennessee Valley Authority. By 1985, this had become a formal coalition, and the Tennessee Valley Energy Coalition (TVEC) was founded. It later evolved to the Southern Alliance for Clean Energy (SACE). TVEC championed ratepayer protections and tracked the environmental and energy policies of the Tennessee Valley Authority. By the late 1980s, the informal group had started to become a full-time operation, and was formally consulted on a number of major TVA initiatives in the late 1980s onwards. This included the management and financing of nuclear power in Tennessee, including the Browns Ferry Nuclear Plant. From the mid-1980s onwards, journalists would frequently use TVEC financial analysis to draw summaries on how TVA policies would likely affect the local energy market and taxpayers.

In 1992, TVEC's name changed to Tennessee Valley Energy Reform Coalition (TVERC). In 1993, Stephen A. Smith, SACE's current executive director, became the executive director of TVERC after serving on the board.

In 1999, TVERC was renamed the Southern Alliance For Clean Energy (SACE) as the organization expanded its focus beyond the TVA service area to encompass clean energy efforts with other utility providers in Florida and South Carolina. In 2001, SACE merged with Georgians For Clean Energy, thereby expanding its influence in the Southeast to also include Georgia. The ex-TVA Chairman S. David Freeman joined the SACE Board of Advisors in 2020.

SACE's programs have expanded to address multiple issues relating to energy and the environment, such as increasing renewable energy deployment with a focus on solar power programs, the use of electric transportation, reducing reliance on fossil fuel power stations, and addressing climate change.

== Climate Advocacy and Decarbonization ==
Since 1998, SACE has been involved in monitoring and promoting the development of clean energy solutions in the southeastern United States. SACE releases four annual reports as part of this monitoring, “Solar in the Southeast,” “Transportation Electrification in the Southeast,” "Energy Efficiency in the Southeast," and “Tracking Decarbonization in the Southeast.” All four of the reports analyze how clean energy has been utilized in the previous year.

SACE has also partnered with a number of American corporations and non-profits to understand both the need and benefits of transitioning to clean energy to protect the global climate. More recently, SACE Executive Director Stephen A. Smith was quoted in the New York Times stating that the Tennessee Valley Authority needed to be a leader on climate protection by shifting to clean power more quickly.

In Memphis, Tennessee, SACE has supported the Memphis Has the Power campaign, a multi-year effort to secure affordable, equitable, and clean energy for Memphis residents and to press the Tennessee Valley Authority and Memphis Light, Gas and Water toward greater investment in energy efficiency and renewables. The campaign has been credited with helping secure the 2017 redesign of MLGW's Share the Pennies low-income energy assistance program into an opt-out format, and SACE has held an appointed seat on MLGW's Power Supply Advisory Team. SACE staff have also organized Memphis-area residents to raise energy-burden and equity concerns directly at TVA board meetings.

== Reducing Reliance on Fossil Fuels ==
SACE has regularly campaigned for the phasing out of fossil fuel power plants. Following completion of TVA's 1995 IRP, TVERC shifted its focus to research on air pollution and efforts to clean up or retire coal-fired power plants. In 1997, TVERC formed the Tennessee Clean Air Task Force.

In the early 2000s, SACE participated in national campaigns addressing emissions and pollution from coal-fired power plants, including the Clear the Air Campaign. In 2000, SACE, as part of the Clean Air Task Force, commissioned a study, Out of Sight: Haze in our National Parks, claiming that cleaner air in the Great Smoky Mountains National Park could boost the local tourism-driven economy by up to $300 million. In 2003, SACE joined the Clean Air Task Force’s National Clean Up Diesel Campaign.

Several environmental incidents during this period informed the organization’s advocacy. The 2008 Kingston Fossil Plant coal ash spill in Tennessee, the largest industrial spill in U.S. history, drew national attention to coal ash disposal and regulation. Following the spill, Dr. Stephen Smith was asked to provide testimony before the Senate Environment and Public Works Committee, which oversees TVA. at its January 8, 2009, hearing on the coal ash disaster. In his testimony, Smith called for greater regulation of coal ash, increased oversight of TVA’s coal ash impoundments, and for TVA to restart public Integrated Resource Planning in an effort to have TVA retire its fleet of aging coal-fired power plants.

SACE continues to advocate against the Tennessee Valley Authority's over-reliance on coal power. In the early 2020s, both short- and long-term energy policy plans suggested the state of Tennessee would begin to reduce its reliance on coal. Part of these plans were for additional gas power stations, but SACE questioned publicly both the logic and reasoning for the use of methane gas as a fuel source. SACE had campaigned for two coal power plants in Tennessee to be replaced by clean energy initiatives, but TVA instead opted for methane gas. In 2026, TVA backtracked on their plans to close the two coal power plants.

In 2010, following the Deepwater Horizon oil spill, SACE launched the Clean Energy Gulf Challenge, a competition offering a cash prize for proposals demonstrating how the United States could eliminate both offshore oil drilling in the Gulf of Mexico and imports of Persian Gulf oil.

SACE has also participated in campaigns opposing the expansion of offshore oil and gas drilling along the Southeast coast, including as a longtime sponsor of Hands Across the Sand, an annual international day of action in which participants gather on beaches to oppose offshore drilling and advocate for clean energy alternatives. SACE has been listed among the event's sponsoring organizations alongside groups such as the Surfrider Foundation, Oceana, and the Sierra Club in multiple years of the campaign. More recently, SACE joined more than 140 environmental organizations in a 2026 letter urging the U.S. Department of the Interior to reject a proposed expansion of offshore drilling leases along U.S. coastlines.

== Renewable Energy advocacy ==
In 1998, TVERC engaged with TVA to launch the Green Power Switch program, giving TVA ratepayers the option to support wind, solar, and biogas renewable resources. Following the launch of TVA’s Green Power Switch program, SACE subsequently supported the development of voluntary green power pricing programs across the Southeast. In North Carolina, the nonprofit NC GreenPower launched in 2003 with participation from environmental and renewable energy advocates, including SACE. In 2003, the Georgia Public Service Commission approved Georgia Power's Green Energy Pricing Program, which was developed with input from SACE and other environmental groups. In Florida, Florida Power & Light launched its Sunshine Energy program in 2004. Smith stated that the utility had "done more in a year than any other Southeastern utility" to support renewable energy development and encouraged further expansion of clean energy investments.

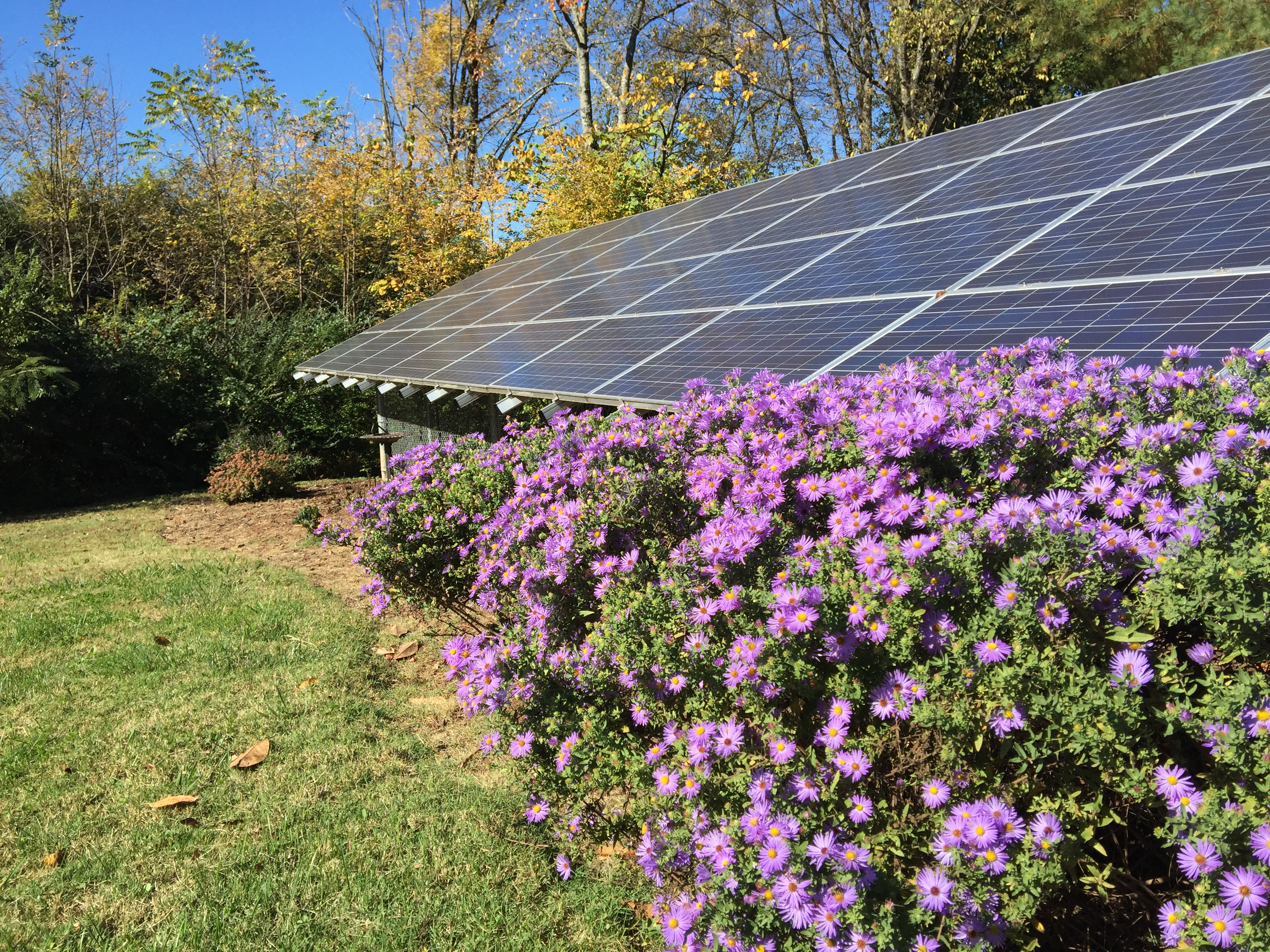
Solar panels in Tennessee

In 2004, SACE co-founded the Tennessee Wind Working Group in partnership with TVA and the State of Tennessee to promote wind energy development and education in the region.

SACE has also supported solar energy policy initiatives. In 2014, the organization helped organize the Solar Uprising rally at the Florida State Capitol, advocating for expanded solar energy policies in the state. The following year, the SACE Action Fund, the organization's affiliated 501(c)(4) advocacy organization, co-founded Floridians for Solar Choice, a coalition that supported policies to expand customer access to solar energy. SACE collaborated with activists including Debbie Dooley on solar-related causes in Florida and other states. In 2016, the SACE Action Fund took positions on several Florida ballot initiatives affecting renewable energy markets, including Florida Amendment 1. SACE argues that homeowners with rooftop solar should continue to receive fair compensation for electricity generated by domestic solar panels, which is then exported to the grid.

In a collaboration with Vote Solar and Sierra Club, SACE announced it was filing a lawsuit against the North Carolina Utilities Commission. The lawsuit challenges the Commission chairman's attempt stop its 2026 solar procurement process.

== Clean, Electric Transportation ==
In 2009, SACE partnered with the University of Tennessee Institute of Agriculture and the Tennessee Department of Environment and Conservation to establish a biodiesel production unit in Tennessee. In 2012, SACE partnered with Clean Energy Biofuels to open a retail biodiesel fueling station in Atlanta, Georgia. The station was developed as part of the U.S. Department of Energy's I-75 Green Corridor Project and was described as the only retail biodiesel fueling station located inside Atlanta's Perimeter at the time of its opening.

In 2019, SACE launched the Driving on Sunshine Roadshow, a regional tour designed to provide residents across the Southeast with opportunities to ride in and test-drive electric vehicles.

Since 2020, SACE has led regional transportation electrification work through its Electrify the South program, which leverages research, advocacy, and community outreach to accelerate an equitable transition to electric transportation across the Southeast. The coalition has been working to make the EV transition credible and appealing to Southern audiences by emphasizing economic and consumer benefits alongside environmental ones. As part of this program, SACE co-founded the Southeast Electric Transportation Regional Initiative (SETRI), a multi-state coalition working to accelerate EV market growth in the region.

Beginning in 2023, SACE and the Southeast Sustainability Directors Network (SSDN) launched the Electrify the South Collaborative, an ongoing peer-learning initiative connecting sustainability directors, city managers, and fleet managers from municipalities across the Southeast to help them access federal transportation-electrification funding. The initiative has been recognized by Duke University's Nicholas Institute for Environmental Policy Solutions as one of the region's key local government transportation electrification programs, alongside efforts by the EPA and regional Clean Cities coalitions. The inaugural Collaborative convened representatives from 38 cities and towns for a two-day meeting in Savannah, Georgia, in September 2023, with subsequent in-person and virtual convenings held in cities including Orlando, Florida.

SACE has also partnered with EVHybridNoire on a multi-year research and community engagement initiative examining EV knowledge, attitudes, and access barriers among Black and Latino communities in Georgia and North Carolina.
