= Sludge (disambiguation) =

Sludge is a semi-solid slurry produced from industrial processes.

Sludge may also refer to:

- Sewage sludge
- Mining sludge
- Biliary sludge
- Oil sludge, a solid or gel in motor oil caused by the oil gelling or solidifying
- Sludge metal, a fusion genre between doom metal and hardcore punk
- Sludge content, a split video format
- Sludge (comics), an Ultraverse comic book
- Sludge (film), a 2005 documentary film by Appalshop filmmaker Robert Salyer
- SLUDGE syndrome, a medical acronym describing the symptoms of overdose or poisoning of certain drugs and pesticides
- Sludge (news), an investigative journalism news outlet covering lobbying and money in politics
- Sludge theory, an economic behavioral theory

== See also ==
- Slurry
