= Kingston Fossil Plant =

Coal-fired power plant in Tennessee, United States

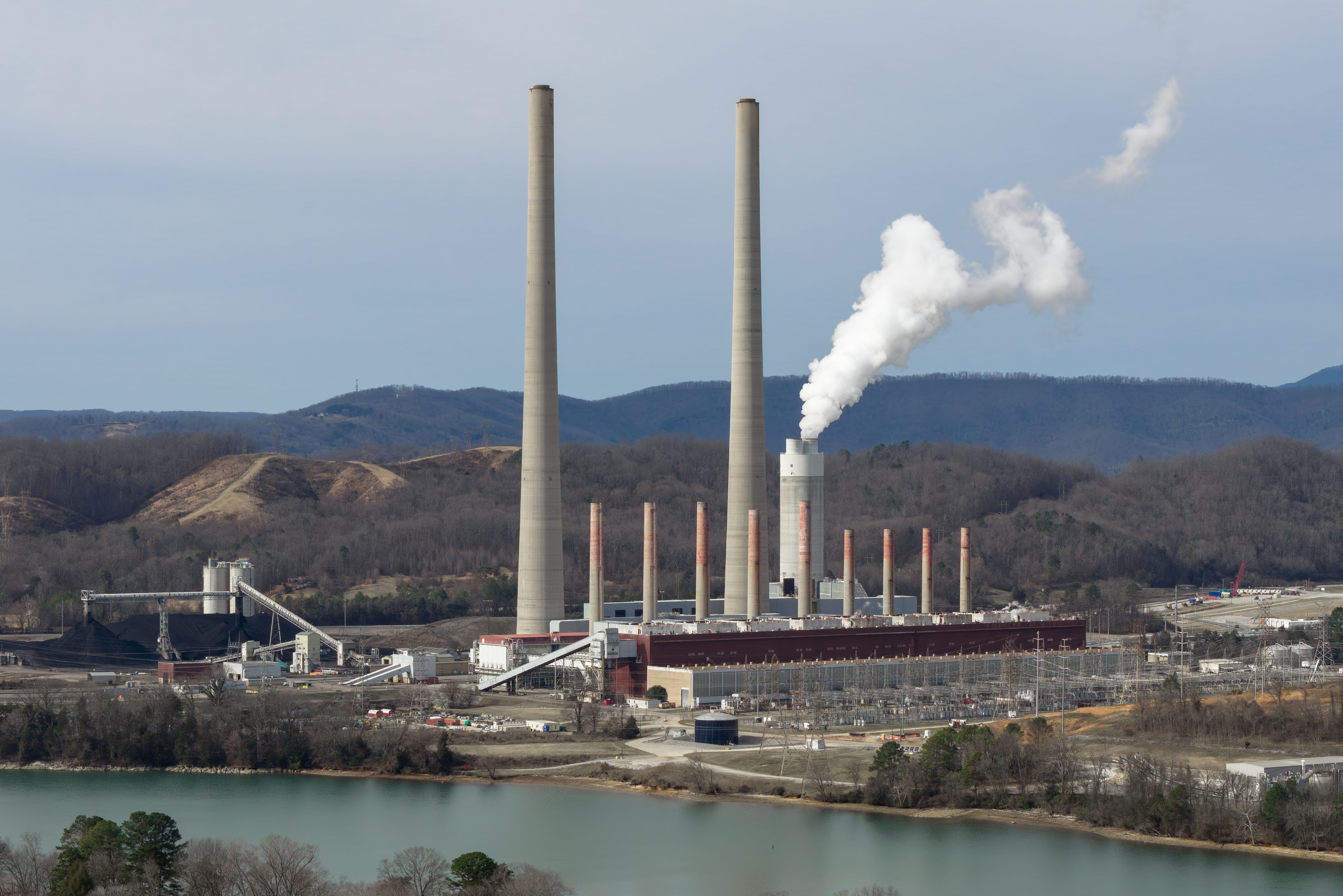
- Kingston Fossil Plant
- Country: United States
- Location: Harriman, Tennessee
- Coordinates: 35°53′54″N 84°31′08″W
- Status: Operational
- Commission date: Unit 1: February 8, 1954 Unit 2: April 29, 1954; Unit 3: June 11, 1954; Unit 4: July 27, 1954; Unit 5: January 18, 1955; Unit 6: March 3, 1955; Unit 7: May 6, 1955; Unit 8: August 3, 1955 Unit 9: December 2, 1955
- Construction cost: US$198,200,000 (equivalent to $2,382,000,000 in 2025)
- Owner: Tennessee Valley Authority
- Operator: Tennessee Valley Authority

Thermal power station
- Primary fuel: Coal
- Cooling source: Watts Bar Lake

Power generation
- Units operational: 9
- Nameplate capacity: 1,398 MW

External links
- Commons: Related media on Commons

Kingston Fossil Plant, commonly known as Kingston Steam Plant, is a 1.4-gigawatt (1,398 MW) coal-fired power plant located in Roane County, just outside Kingston, Tennessee, on the shore of Watts Bar Lake. It is operated by the Tennessee Valley Authority. The plant is known for the Kingston Fossil Plant fly ash spill which occurred in December 2008.

== History ==
Construction of the Kingston Fossil Plant began on April 30, 1951. It was the largest coal-fired power plant in the world when completed in 1955. It was built primarily to provide electricity for the nearby Oak Ridge National Laboratory. A dedication ceremony for the plant took place on November 17, 1955.

The plant has nine generating units: Units 1–4, rated at 175 MW each (launched into service in 1954), and Units 5–9, rated at 200 MW each (launched in 1955). Combined, the plant has a total capacity of 1,700 MWe (1,398 MWe net). It produces about ten billion kilowatt hours of electricity from some five million tons of coal each year. All nine generating units are equipped with selective catalytic reduction (SCR) systems to reduce nitrogen oxide (NO_{x}) emissions that contribute to the formation of ozone. In 1976, its original nine stacks were taken out of service (though left standing) and replaced by a pair of 1,000-foot (304.8 meter) tall chimneys, one for Units 1–5 and one for Units 6–9. These stacks were replaced with a single stack connected to scrubbers which were installed in 2007.

The plant is a popular site for birdwatchers, as many waterfowl come to the settling and treatment ponds nearby.

After decommissioning many other of its coal plants, TVA plans to operate Kingston for many more years.

== 2008 spill ==
In December 2008, an impoundment at the plant failed, releasing 1.1 billion US gallons (4,200,000 m^{3}) of coal fly ash slurry that covered up to 300 acres (1.2 km^{2}) of the surrounding land, damaging homes and flowing into nearby waterways such as the Emory River and Clinch River, tributaries of the Tennessee River. This was the largest accidental release of coal fly ash in the United States.

== EPA compliance agreement ==
On April 14, 2011, the U.S. Environmental Protection Agency (EPA) announced a settlement with the Tennessee Valley Authority to resolve alleged Clean Air Act violations at 11 of its coal-fired plants in Alabama, Kentucky, and Tennessee. Under the terms of the agreement, Units 1–9 will continuously operate SCR systems to reduce their emissions of NO_{x}.

== See also ==
- List of power stations in Tennessee
