= Sludge (film) =

- Directed by: Robert Salyer
- Release date: 2005
- Country: United States
- Language: English

Sludge is a 2005 documentary film by Appalshop filmmaker Robert Salyer chronicling the Martin County Sludge Spill that was an accident that occurred after midnight on October 11, 2000, when a coal sludge impoundment in Martin County, Kentucky, broke through an underground mine below, propelling 306 million gallons of sludge down two tributaries of the Tug Fork River. The movie documents the continuing story of the Martin County disaster, the resulting federal investigation, and the looming threat of coal sludge ponds throughout the coalfield region.

In the United States today, coal is the largest single source of fuel for energy production. Annually, the country mines over a billion tons of coal. Coal waste is a consequence of this consumption; the Mine Safety and Health Administration has estimated that there are over 235 sludge ponds throughout the region with the potential to break into an underground mine, as the Martin County pond did in 2000.
