= Prenter, West Virginia =

- Unincorporated community
- Location within West Virginia Location within the United States
- Coordinates: 38°00′52″N 81°37′37″W
- Country: United States
- State: West Virginia
- County: Boone
- Elevation: 968 ft (295 m)
- Time zone: UTC-5 (Eastern (EST))
  - Summer (DST): UTC-4 (EDT)
- Area codes: 304 & 681
- GNIS feature ID: 1545237

Prenter is an unincorporated community and coal town in Boone County, West Virginia, United States. Prenter is 11 miles (18 km) east-southeast of Madison.
