= Coal-water slurry fuel =

Combustible mixture of coal particles in water

Coal-water slurry fuel is a mixture of fine coal particles suspended in water. Such slurries are used to transport coal. Typically, the slurry is dried prior to combustion. In principle but not in practice, coal slurries can be used to power boilers, gas turbines, diesel engines, and heating and power stations.

== Characteristics ==
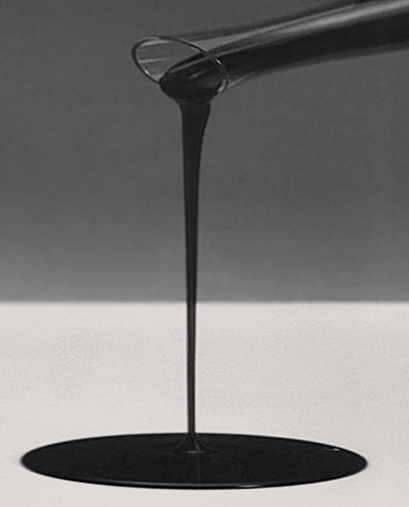
Coal-water slurry fuel, Grade III

A coal-water slurry fuel is defined by a number of factors including its viscosity, particle size, rate of sedimentation, ignition temperature (800–850 °C [1,470–1,560 °F]), combustion temperature (950–1,150 °C [1,740–2,100 °F]), ash content and calorific value (3,700–4,700 kilocalories per kilogram [15.5–19.7 MJ/kg]).

When coal-water slurry fuel combusts, over ninety-nine percent of its carbon content is consumed. Coal-water slurry fuel is fire-proof and explosion-proof. Ash content of less than ten percent is desirable for boilers. For diesel engines, there is no limit.

Parameters	І GRADE	ІІ GRADE	ІІІ GRADE
Coal content, %	≥ 65	63–65	60–63
Viscosity	≤ 1200		
Minimum energy yield (kcal/kg)	≥ 4700	4420–4660	4000–4420
Ash content, %	≤ 6	6–8	8–10
Sulfur content, %	≤ 0.35	0.35–0.65	0.65–0.80
Ash softening temperature	≤ 1250		
Particles of more than 300 μm, %	≤ 0.05	0.05–0.20	0.20–0.80#
Particles up to 75 μm, %	≥ 75.0		
Volatile content, %	> 30	20–30	≤ 20

== Production ==
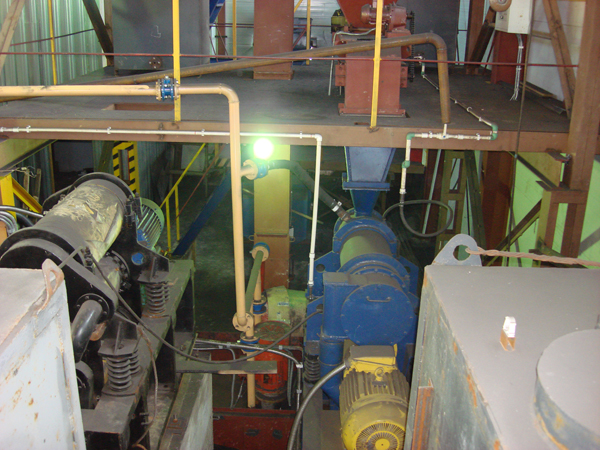
Ball mills for production of coal-water slurry in Russia

The production of coal-water slurry fuel involves the crushing of coal or coal sludge to particles between 10 and 65 micrometers diameter (standard crushers can be used); wet milling and homogenisation (with additives as required). The resulting product (coal slurry) is then prepared for intermediate storage or transport.

Large particle coal-water slurry fuel can be used to produce steam in boilers. Smaller (under 80 micrometer) particle coal-water slurry fuel can be used in diesel engines with or without co-fuels. For example, low speed marine or modular power plant diesels can operate on pure coal-water slurry fuel whereas medium speed diesels such as locomotive engines may need diesel as a co-fuel which will act as an ignition source. Very small (5 to 10 micrometer) particle coal-water slurry fuel has been trialled in combined cycle gas turbine power plants. Smaller sized particles are more versatile in use but are more difficult to produce.

== Prototypes ==
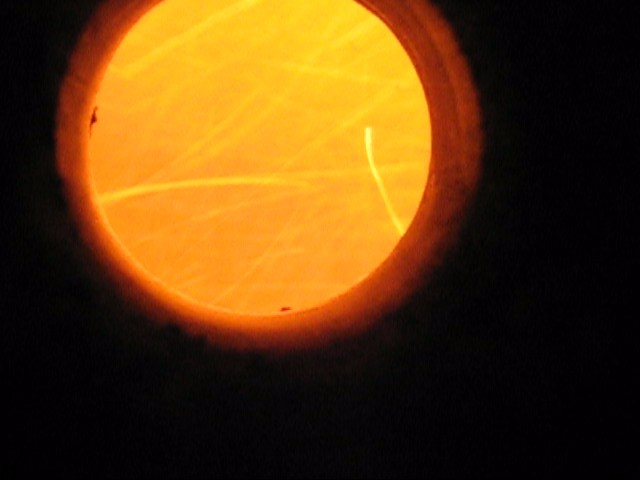
Combustion of coal water slurry fuel in a steam boiler, Murmanskaya region, Russia.

Converting coal into a liquid form may simplify the delivery and dispensing of the fuel. It may be a cost-efficient alternative to oil and natural gas. Separating non-carbonaceous material before making the slurry may reduce the production of ash to two percent.

=== Development ===
Type of coal	Possibility
Brown coal (lignite)	possible, tested and confirmed
Flame coal (V=40–45%)	well developed
Gas flame coal, gas coal (V=28–40%)	well developed
Fat coal – anthracite (V=7–28%)	possible, tested and confirmed

=== Belovo Novosibirsk project ===
In the late 1950s, the Soviet Union looked for new methods of using coal sludge for power generation. Coal-water slurry fuel was made in a ball mill which pulverised the coal or coal sludge. This was done near a coal mine in Belovo, Siberia. The coal-water slurry fuel was transported through a pipeline to Novosibirskaya TEC-5, Novosibirsk, a distance of 262 km (163 mi). The pipeline had three intermediate pumping stations. The Belovo Novosibirsk project used coal-water slurry fuel in steam boilers at a rate of 1340 tonnes per hour. There was a further project at Belovo Novosibirsk between 1989 and 1993 and development of coal-water slurry fuel technology for district heating stations and power stations. In 2004, a coal-water slurry fuel production plant was opened at Enskiy village, Murmansk.

=== Austria ===
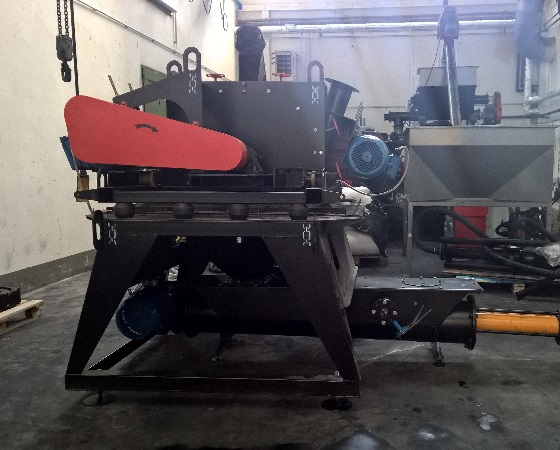
Coal water slurry fuel production machine in Austria

In 2012, the Austrian company, Effective Energy Technology GmbH (EET) built facilities for production and combustion of coal-water slurry fuel in Europe. Examples of the technology in practice are hydroshock type wet-milling devices and standard water boilers equipped with swirl pre-chamber and coal-water slurry nozzle., developed by group of companies EET.

=== Ukraine ===
Verkhovna Rada requested China Development Bank credit for the implementation of coal-water slurry fuel technology. Ukteplokom, a state owned entity, commenced operation.

== See also ==
- Coal dust
- Pulverized coal-fired boiler
