= Martin County coal slurry spill =

2000 environmental disaster in Kentucky, US

Coordinates: 37°44′50″N 82°32′50″W

Map showing location of Martin County in Kentucky

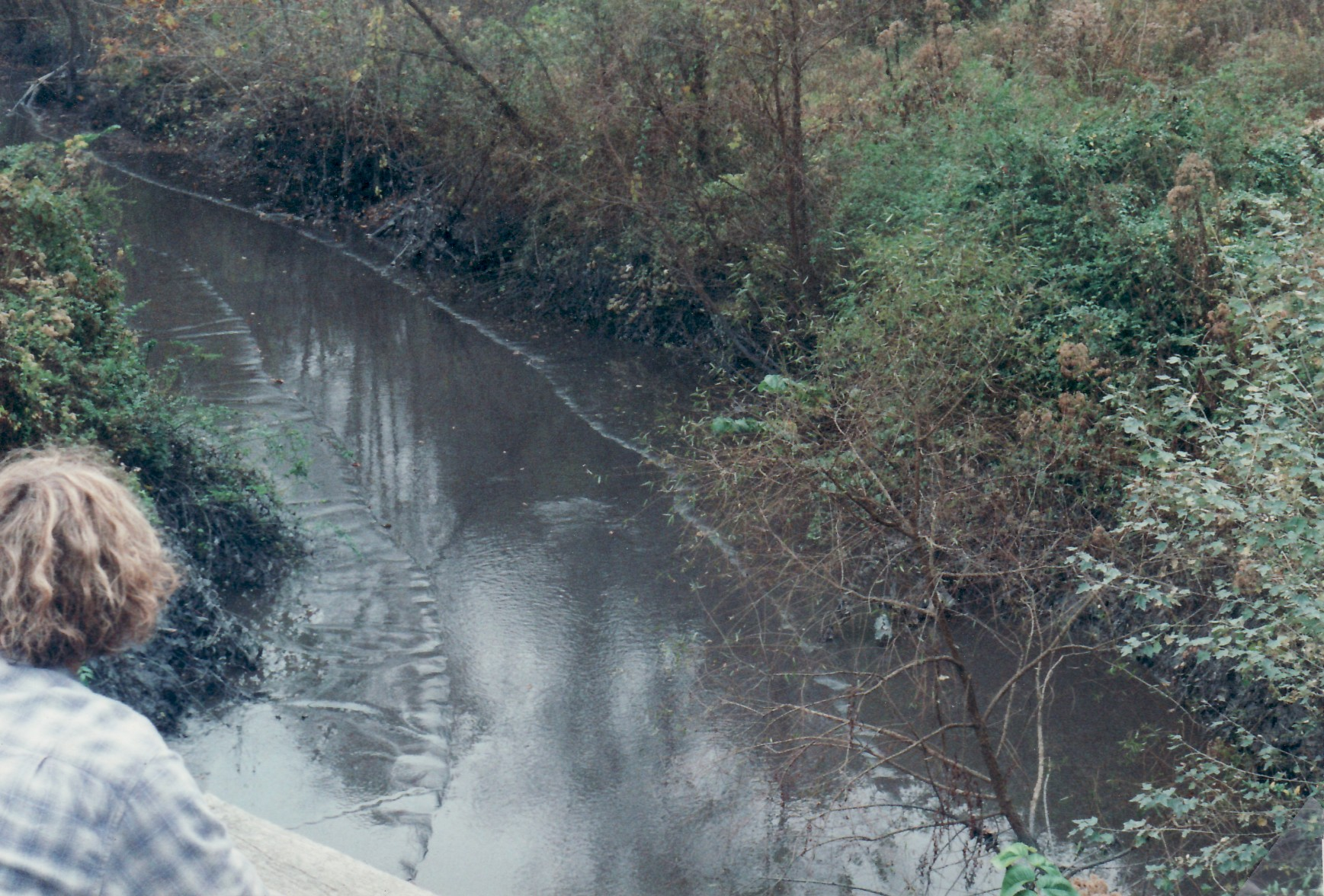
Wolf Creek on October 22, 2000

The Martin County coal slurry spill was a mining accident that occurred after midnight on October 11, 2000, when the bottom of a coal slurry impoundment owned by Massey Energy in Martin County, Kentucky, broke into an abandoned underground mine below. The slurry came out of the mine openings, sending an estimated 306 million US gallons (1.16 million cubic metres; 1.16 billion litres) of slurry down two tributaries of the Tug Fork River. By morning, Wolf Creek was oozing with the black waste; on Coldwater Fork, a 10-foot-wide (3.0 m) stream became a 100-yard (91 m) expanse of thick slurry.

== Event ==
The spill, which contained arsenic and mercury, killed everything in the water. It was over five feet deep in places and covered nearby residents' yards. The spill polluted hundreds of miles (200–300 mi or 300–500 km) of the Big Sandy River and its tributaries and the Ohio River. The water supply for over 27,000 residents was contaminated, and all aquatic life in Coldwater Fork and Wolf Creek was killed.

The spill was about 28 times larger than the Exxon Valdez oil spill. It was one of the worst environmental disasters ever in the southeastern United States, according to the United States Environmental Protection Agency (EPA). The spill was exceeded in volume by the Kingston Fossil Plant coal fly ash slurry spill in 2008.

In 2001, the EPA ordered Massey Energy to clean up and restore the damaged areas of Martin County. The EPA took measures to investigate this site and make restoration plans. A decade later, there are still water quality issues in Martin County; people are still finding sludge and slurry in their surface waters, such as streams.

== Aftermath ==
U.S. Secretary of Labor Elaine Chao, wife of Senator Mitch McConnell (R-Ky.), oversaw the Mine Safety and Health Administration (MSHA) at the time. In 2002, a federal penalty of $5,600 (equivalent to $10,000 today) was levied against Massey Energy and was subsequently paid. When the Bush administration came into power, they cut the investigation short, as Massey Energy was a generous contributor to the Republican Party. In addition, the Bush presidency aimed to expand energy production and resources in the U.S., and therefore relaxed regulations.

Since the spill, MSHA made efforts to prevent this from happening in the future by implementing new slurry pond regulations. A few of MSHA's efforts include increasing training for staff, and requiring mining engineers to perform thorough investigations of mining impoundment areas.

Jack Spadaro, a whistleblower who worked in natural resources and mining, was one of the lead investigators that looked into the spill. He reported evidence that showed the administration and the engineers who were to be looking out for the best interests of people were aware of another spill in the same area from 1994 on, but they had never released the information to the public and had instead covered it up. Specifically, Spadaro argued that the Bush administration was covering up the Martin County spill. Spadaro complained that the new administration had given lucrative contracts for work at the National Mine Health and Safety Academy to friends, and that the MSHA was divided into 186 smaller contracts. The MSHA denied the accusations. On June 4, 2003, government agents began sifting through Spadaro's documents in his office. He was locked out and placed on involuntary administrative leave. Eventually the investigation was closed, and Spadaro's evidence was discarded.

== Documentary ==
In 2005, Appalshop filmmaker Robert Salyer released a documentary entitled Sludge, chronicling the continuing story of the Martin County disaster, the resulting federal investigation, and the looming threat of coal slurry ponds throughout the coalfield region. In the wake of the Kingston Fossil Plant coal fly ash slurry spill, Appalshop provided a web stream of Sludge for a limited time.

== See also ==
- Buffalo Creek Flood
- Mountaintop removal mining
- Martin County Kentucky Water Crisis
