= Coal slurry =

Product of coal preparation

Coal slurry is a mixture of solids (mined coal or coal waste) and liquids (water or organic) produced by a coal preparation plant.

== Preparation ==
To transform the coal ash into a slurry, coal is separated from non-combustible components and can be fractionated by particle size as well. Coal slurry can be transferred by pipeline or with specialized pumps such as a progressive cavity pump to pump the highly abrasive, corrosive and viscous coal slurry. More than 7 billion tons of coal are mined per year (2010), using approximately 200 litres of water per ton. However, the amount of water required hinges on the surface characteristics of the coal being used. Most coal slurries require the addition of a surfactant to reduce the viscosity, ergo reduce the stress on pipelines and pumps.

Recent studies have employed new methods of slurry preparation, like using ultrasonic irradiation and a mixture of natural and synthetic surfactants to improve the stability and rheological properties of coal slurry.

== Environmental concerns ==
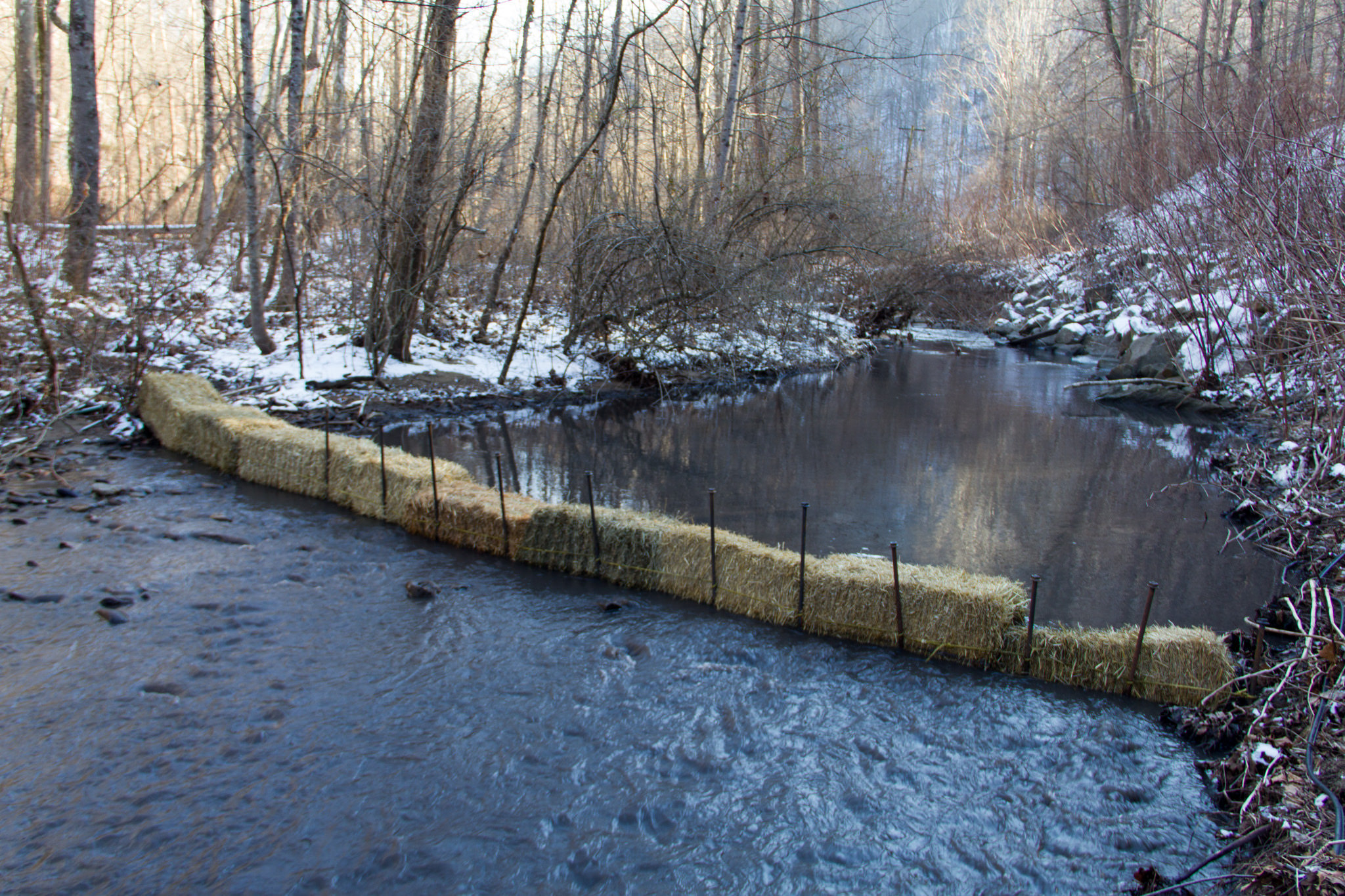
A 2014 coal slurry spill into a river at Patriot Coal, West Virginia. A straw impoundment has been created across the river to try to hold the spillage.

Ideally, coal slurry consists only of crushed coal and water, which can be efficiently separated. In practice, the separation is significantly costly because of the large amounts of water needed and wastewater generated by the process. Furthermore, the slurry consists also of very fine coal dust that results in a waste called blackwater. As blackwater cannot be purified by a water treatment plant, it is stored in large impoundment ponds. Such ponds are susceptible to disastrous releases, such as the Buffalo Creek flood of 1972 or the Martin County coal slurry spill of 2000, which released over 250 million gallons of coal slurry. Coal slurry can contain hazardous chemicals such as arsenic and mercury and can kill aquatic wildlife, as was the case in the Martin County spill. This impounded liquid waste can sometimes total billions of gallons in a single facility.

== The scope of coal slurry applications ==
To date, coal slurry fuels are recognised to have low energy density and therefore can only be successfully combusted in high compression engines such as diesel or gas turbine power plants (large engines with low energy density requirements). Other engine systems include slow speed diesel engines and turbines used as power plants for shipping and stationary electricity production. However, in the combustion market, for small and medium power plants ranging from 20 kW (27 hp) to 5 MW (6,700 hp), the utilisation of CSs will require boiler’s retrofitting.

Other applications found for these slurries are in systems such as boilers, gasifiers and stationary engines with specific requirements divided into two main areas: chemical and physical as shown in table below.

Aspect	Parameter	Application
Fuel chemistry	Low N < 0.6 wt% (db.) Low S < 0.1 wt% (db.) (limit for corrosion)	Boiler
Fuel chemistry	Ash < 0.01% wt% (db.)	Diesel engine (No. 2 diesel fuel)
Fuel chemistry	Bulk density 0.6-0.9 ton/m^{3} or higher	Boiler and gasifier
Physical and handling property	Viscosity ≤1000 mPa at shear rate of 100s^{−1} at 25 °C (77 °F) (desirable for fuel handling).	Boiler

== See also ==
- Coal-water slurry fuel
- Pulverized coal
- Sludge (film)
- Tailings dam
