= 2016 Florida Amendment 1 =

Failed proposal on solar energy

- Rights of Electricity Consumers Regarding Solar Energy Choice
- Outcome: Amendment not adopted (failed to reach 60% threshold)

Results
Choice	Votes	%
Yes	4,544,601	50.77%
No	4,406,583	49.23%
Valid votes	8,951,184	93.43%
Invalid or blank votes	629,305	6.57%
Total votes	9,580,489	100.00%
County results
Yes
60–70%
50–60%
No
50–60%
60–70%

Florida Amendment 1, whose full title is Rights of Electricity Consumers Regarding Solar Energy Choice, Amendment 1, is a 2016 constitutional amendment on solar energy in the U.S. state of Florida. It is supported by Consumers for Smart Solar and opposed by Floridians for Solar Choice. The amendment has been called misleading by opponents.

== Results ==
Although the amendment received a majority of the vote, it failed to receive the needed 60% supermajority support to pass, receiving only 50.77% of votes cast.

Amendment 1
Choice	Votes	%
Yes	4,560,682	50.79
No	4,418,788	49.21
Required majority		60
Total	8,979,470	100.00
Source: Florida Secretary of State
