= Coal dust =

Fine-powdered form of coal

Coal dust is a fine-powdered form of coal which is created by the crushing, grinding, or pulverization of coal rock. Because of the brittle nature of coal, coal dust can be created by mining, transporting, or mechanically handling it.

Grinding or pulverizing coal to a dust form before combusting it improves the speed and efficiency of burning, which makes the coal easier to handle. However, coal dust is hazardous to workers if it is suspended in air outside the controlled environment of grinding and combustion equipment. It poses the acute hazard of forming an explosive mixture in air and the chronic hazard of causing pulmonary illness in people who inhale excessive quantities of it.

The distribution of the particle-size of coal dust is frequently measured in mesh. The British slang term for cheap fuel consisting of coal dust (slack) containing small lumps of coal (nuts) is nutty slack.

== Energy generation ==
For use in thermal power plants, coal is ground into dust using a device called a powdered coal mill. The resulting product, called powdered coal or pulverized coal, is then generally used in a fossil fuel power plant for electricity generation. Pulverized coal is a significant dust explosion hazard, as large quantities are suspended in air for transfer from the mill to the power plant. Explosions have occurred when the flow drops and flames in the burning chamber pass back along the ductwork delivering fuel.

== Hazards ==
Coal dust is a fugitive combustible dust - a dust that is both a pollutant and combustible when dispersed into the air. Due to the small particle size and combustible nature of this dust, there is a risk of an explosion and inhalation. The control of coal dust is difficult due to the coal dust being such a fine particle, allowing it to escape and be suspended in the air for a large amount of time.

Dust explosion pentagon showing the needed elements for an explosion: Oxygen, Combustible dust, Dispersion of dust, Confinement of dust, and an Ignition Source.

=== Explosions ===
Stages of a coal dust explosion. Top, Beginning stage of a propagating coal dust explosion. Middle, The flame front appears behind the shock wave. Bottom, The cycle continues with the shock wave lifting coal dust and the lagging flame front igniting and propagating the explosion.

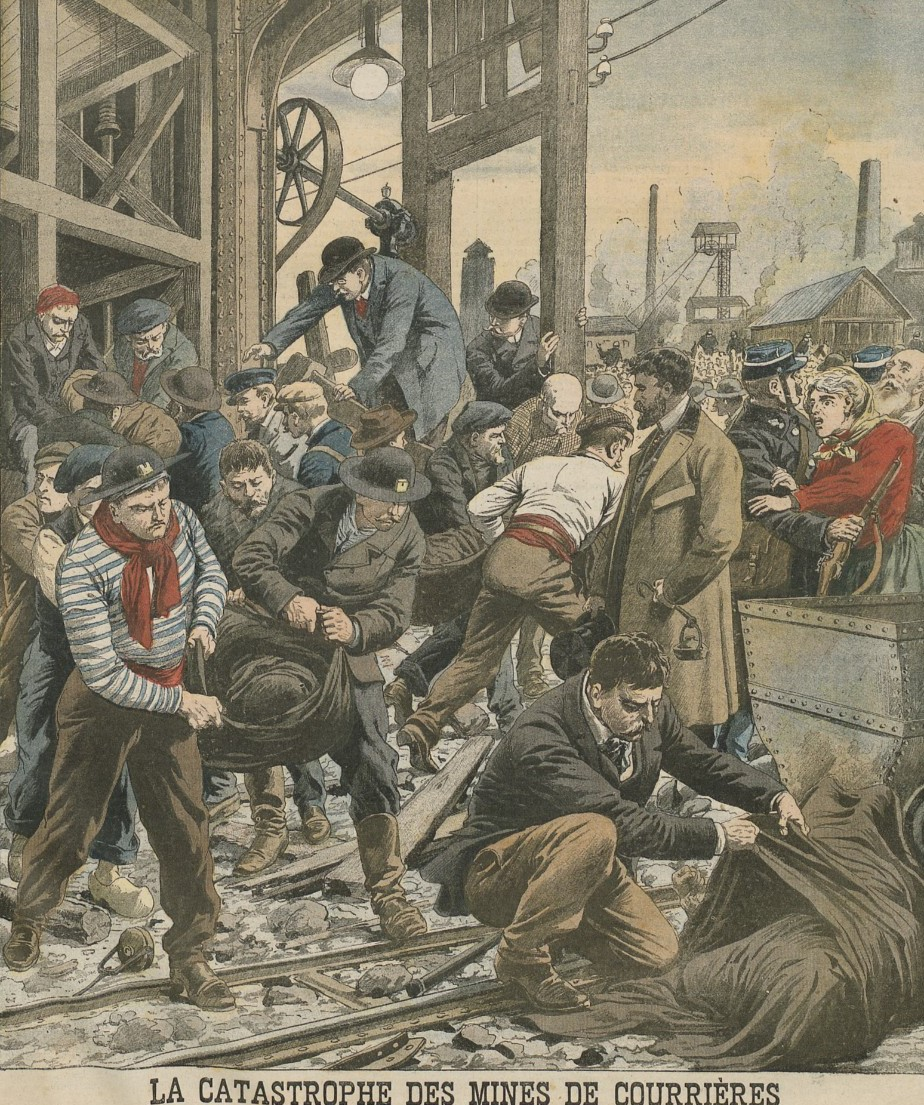
Le Petit Journal illustration of the Courrières mine disaster

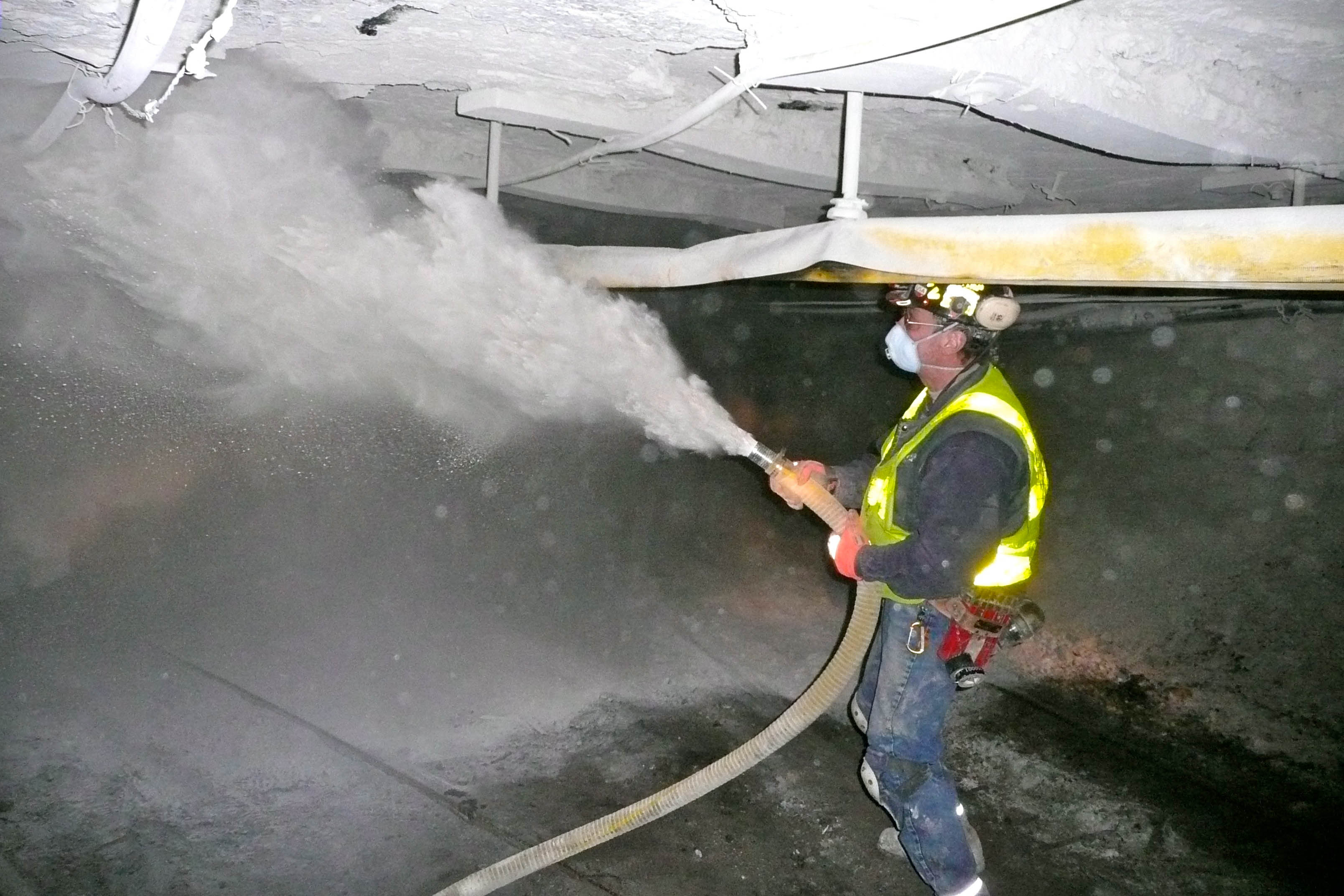
Coal miner spraying rock dust to mitigate coal dust in a mine.

Coal dust suspended in air is explosive—coal dust has far more surface area per unit weight than lumps of coal, and is more susceptible to spontaneous combustion. However, five elements are needed for an explosion to occur: oxygen, an ignition source, coal dust, dispersion of the coal dust, and confinement of the dust. For instance, a nearly empty coal store is a greater explosion risk than a full one. This is due to the increase of space in the store for oxygen and dispersion to take place.

The worst mining accidents in history have been caused by coal dust explosions, such as the disaster at Senghenydd in South Wales in 1913 in which 439 miners died, the Courrières mine disaster in Northern France which killed 1,099 miners in 1906, the Luisenthal Mine disaster in Germany, which claimed 299 lives in 1962, and the worst: the explosion at Benxihu Colliery, China, which killed 1,549 in 1942. Such accidents were usually initiated by firedamp ignitions, the shock wave of which raised coal dust from the floor of the mine galleries to make an explosive mixture. The problem was investigated by Michael Faraday and Charles Lyell at the colliery at Haswell County Durham of 1844, but their conclusions were ignored at the time.

=== Inhalation ===
Inhaling coal dust can cause a number of respiratory diseases. Coal worker's pneumoconiosis, or black lung disease, affects over a tenth of veteran coal miners in the United States (minimum 25 years in the field). Chronic obstructive pulmonary disease (COPD) is another illness seen in coal miners with long term exposure to coal dust. Coal miners in Kentucky, West Virginia, and Virginia contract these particular diseases at an increased rate. This is in part due to a higher amount of silica in the coal dust that is created in Appalachia in comparison to other coal mining sites in the United States.

Similarly, coal dust inhalation can cause emphysema. Commonly a disease seen in smokers, coal dust inhalation has an additive affect with smoking and causing emphysema. Chronically inhaling coal dust, typically the dust produced as a byproduct of coal mining, deposits the dust in the airways, causing these diseases. Symptoms of the above diseases, as well as those related to bronchitis, are seen in coal miners with as little as 2 years of coal dust exposure.

== Prevention ==
For safe handling/storage of coal dust, the dust must be controlled, maintained, and protected properly. With the presence of coal dust within multiple industries, such as: mining, energy generation, and concrete production, different approaches are necessary. However, a common procedure to undergo is the three C's: contain, capture, and clean. Following this procedure can help prevent unnecessary inhalation or explosions from occurring if following correctly.

=== United states ===
The Occupational Safety and Health Administration (OSHA) has set the legal limit (Permissible exposure limit) for coal dust exposure in the workplace as 2.4 mg/m^{3} (5% SiO_{2}) over an 8-hour workday. The National Institute for Occupational Safety and Health (NIOSH) has set a Recommended exposure limit (REL) of 1 mg/m^{3} (measured by the Mine Safety and Health Administration (MSHA)) or 0.9 mg/m^{3} (measured by ISO/CEN/ACGIH) over an 8-hour workday. NIOSH, OSHA, and MSHA have also set many programs in place to study coal dust and its hazards, and help prevent the diseases it may cause. NIOSH established the Coal Workers' Health Surveillance Program (CWHSP) in 1969 to study the diseases that are caused by chronic coal dust inhalation. This program involves free black lung screening to coal miners in the United States, and better autopsy access to coal miners for NIOSH. In 2014, MSHA instated the respirable coal dust rule in order to up the amount of protection that coal miners receive in regards to coal dust. This rule has also lowered the Permissible Exposure Limits as new phases of the plan have been enacted. The United States Department of Labor (DOL) also has a Federal Black Lung Program, or Coal Mine Workers' Compensation, in order to provide compensation to coal miners who are unable to work as a result of contracting black lung disease from coal dust exposure.

=== Hygiene ===
It is always the best practice to maintain a clean workplace and control any hazardous material, especially with a fugitive combustible dust such as coal dust. Many explosions from combustible dust are due to accumulation on walls, floors, and other surfaces. The accumulation of uncontrolled coal dust in a workplace is a dangerous situation that needs to be eliminated. The control of coal dust can be improved by implementing the use of dust-approved vacuums, dust collection systems, methods to reduce fugitive coal dust, and following general housekeeping procedures.

=== Explosions ===
To prevent explosions, it is best to promote and execute good hygiene practices in the workplace by controlling both the coal dust and any possible ignition sources. Some ignition sources that may need to be controlled or used carefully around coal dust includes heavy machinery, electrical components, and open flames or sparks. The main attempts at preventing explosions due to coal dust include using safety lamps, adding stone dust coffers to mine galleries to dilute the coal dust, watering workings and ensuring efficient ventilation of all the workings.

Another means of preventing explosions is by placing rock dust in the coal mine, which is usually pulverized limestone dust, which absorbs thermal energy from the heated gasses. Rock dusting has been used since the early 1900s, but there have been technological improvements since then. Since then, NIOSH developed a Coal Dust Explosibility Meter (CDEM) to test the mixture between coal and rock dust in mines. This field testing process allows miners to gauge the explosibility of their work environment.

== See also ==
- Coal burner
- Coal-water slurry fuel
- Pulverized coal-fired boiler
