= Buffalo Creek flood =

1972 dam failure in West Virginia, United States

Coordinates: 37°47′50″N 81°39′50″W

- Date: February 26, 1972
- Location: Pittston Coal Company's coal slurry impoundment dam #3, located on a hillside in Logan County, West Virginia
- Cause: Coal Mine dam failure
- Casualties: 125 killed 1,121 injured 4,000+ left homeless

The Buffalo Creek flood was a disaster that occurred in Logan County, West Virginia, on February 26, 1972, when a coal slurry impoundment dam burst, causing significant loss of life and property damage.

The impoundment dam, managed by Pittston Coal Company, had been declared "satisfactory" by a federal mine inspector four days earlier. In its legal filings, Pittston referred to the accident as "an Act of God."

== Terrain and sequence of events ==
There were three dams on the site. Dam #3 failed first. Located about 260 feet (79 m) above the town of Saunders, it was built on top of coal slurry sediment that had collected behind dams #1 and #2, instead of on solid bedrock. It was constructed of coarse mining refuse dumped into the Middle Fork of Buffalo Creek.

Dam #3's failure was followed by heavy rains. The water from dam #3 then overwhelmed dams #2 and #1. The resulting flood unleashed approximately 132 million US gallons (500,000 cubic metres; 500 million litres) of black waste water, cresting over 30 feet (9.1 m) high, upon the residents of 16 coal towns along Buffalo Creek Hollow. Out of a population of 5,000 people, 125 were killed, 1,121 were injured, and over 4,000 were left homeless. 507 houses were destroyed, in addition to 44 mobile homes and 30 businesses. The disaster destroyed or damaged homes in Saunders, Pardee, Lorado, Craneco, Lundale, Stowe, Crites, Latrobe, Robinette, Amherstdale, Becco, Fanco, Braeholm, Accoville, Crown and Kistler.

== Investigation ==
Two commissions investigated the disaster. The first, the Governor's Ad Hoc Commission of Inquiry, appointed by Governor Arch A. Moore Jr., was made up entirely of either members sympathetic to the coal industry or government officials whose departments might have been complicit in the genesis of the flood. One of the investigators was Jack Spadaro, a man who devoted his time to regulating dam construction for safety. After then-president of the United Mine Workers Arnold Miller and others were rebuffed by Gov. Moore regarding their request that a coal miner be added to the governor's commission, a separate citizens' commission was assembled to provide an independent review of the disaster.

The Governor's Commission of Inquiry report called for new legislation and further inquiry by the local prosecutor. The citizens' commission report, concluded that the Buffalo Creek-Pittston Coal Company was guilty of murdering at least 124 men, women and children. Additionally, the chair of the citizen's commission and Deputy Director of the West Virginia Department of Natural Resources, Norman Williams, called for the legislature to outlaw coal strip mining throughout the state. Williams testified before the legislature that strip mining could not exist as a profit-making industry unless it is allowed by the state to pass on the costs of environmental damage to the private landowner or the public.

The state of West Virginia also sued the Buffalo Creek-Pittston Coal Company for $100 million (equivalent to $531 million today) in disaster and relief damages, but a smaller settlement was reached for just $1 million ($5.3 million today) with Governor Moore, three days before he left office in 1977. The lawyers for the plaintiffs, Arnold & Porter of Washington, D.C., donated a portion of their legal fees for the construction of a new community center. West Virginia has yet to build the center, though the center was promised by Governor Moore in May 1972.

Gerald M. Stern, an attorney with Arnold & Porter, wrote a book entitled The Buffalo Creek Disaster about representing the victims of the flood. The book includes descriptions of his experiences dealing with the political and legal environment of West Virginia, where the influence of large coal mining corporations is intensely significant to the local culture and communities. Sociologist Kai T. Erikson, son of psychologist and sociologist Erik Erikson, was called as an expert witness and published a study on the effects of the disaster entitled Everything in Its Path: Destruction of Community in the Buffalo Creek Flood (1978). Erikson's book later won the 1977 Sorokin Award, granted by the American Sociological Association for an "outstanding contribution to the progress of sociology."

Long-term studies have examined the mental health of the residents of Buffalo Creek compared to a nearby coal town that did not experience the flood.

== Results ==
Dennis Prince and some 625 survivors of the flood sued the Pittston Coal Company, seeking $64 million in damages (equivalent to $417.8 million today). They settled in June 1974 for $13.5 million ($88.1 million today), or approximately $13,000 for each individual after legal costs ($85,000 today). A second suit was filed by 348 child survivors, who sought $225 million ($1.47 billion today); they settled for $4.8 million in June 1974 ($31.3 million today).

Kerry Albright became known as the "miracle baby" of the disaster. Running from the leading edge of the water, his mother threw him just above the flood level moments before she drowned. He survived with few ill effects, and was reared by his father. His survival gave hope and inspiration to other survivors.

== Environmental impacts ==
Prior to the disaster, Buffalo Creek was a popular fishing spot. Due to the effects of the flood, Buffalo Creek would not support aquatic life "long after the Feb. 26, 1972 disaster", according to a 2022 account by The Associated Press. After extensive cleanup and remediation efforts, trout restocking began in 2006. By February 2022, 50 years after the accident, trout were once again plentiful in Buffalo Creek.

== See also ==
- Aberfan disaster
- Coal slurry
- Martin County coal slurry spill
- Sludge (film)
- The Buffalo Creek Flood: An Act of Man, a 1974 documentary film about the disaster

== Bibliography ==
- Kai T. Erikson (1976). Everything in Its Path. Simon and Schuster. pp. 284. ISBN 0-671-24067-6.
- Gerald M. Stern, The Buffalo Creek Disaster ISBN 0-394-72343-0
