= Hinchman =

Hinchman may refer to:

== Places ==
- Hinchman, Michigan, an unincorporated community

== People ==
- Bill Hinchman (1883–1963), American baseball player
- Curly Hinchman (1907–1968), American football player
- Harry Hinchman (1878–1933), American baseball player
- Margaretta S. Hinchman (1876–1955), American artist, illustrator, photographer and sculptor
- Ulysses Hinchman, American politician

== Other ==
- Hinchman Formation, a geologic formation in California
- Hinchman H-1 Racer, an American single-seat autogyro

== See also ==
- Field, Hinchman and Smith, also known as SmithGroup, ranks as the United States' 7th largest architecture and engineering firm
- Hinchman-Lippincott House, is located in Haddon Heights, New Jersey
- Henchman
- Inchman (disambiguation)
- Winchman
