= Lionel Taylor =

American football player and coach (1935–2025)

- Taylor in 1965

No. 32, 87
- Position: Wide receiver

Personal information
- Born: August 15, 1935; Kansas City, Missouri, U.S.
- Died: August 6, 2025 (aged 89); Rio Rancho, New Mexico, U.S.
- Listed height: 6 ft 2 in (1.88 m)
- Listed weight: 215 lb (98 kg)

Career information
- High school: Buffalo (Buffalo, West Virginia)
- College: New Mexico Highlands (1955–1958)
- NFL draft: 1959: undrafted

Career history

Playing
- Chicago Bears (1959); Denver Broncos (1960–1966); Oakland Raiders (1967)*; Houston Oilers (1967–1968)
- * Offseason or practice squad member only

Coaching
- Pittsburgh Steelers (1970–1976) Wide receivers coach; Los Angeles Rams (1977–1979) Wide receivers coach; Los Angeles Rams (1980–1981) Offensive coordinator & wide receivers coach; Oregon State (1982–1983) Wide receivers coach; Texas Southern (1984–1988) Head coach; Cleveland Browns (1989) Tight ends coach; Cleveland Browns (1990) Passing game coordinator & tight ends coach; London Monarchs (1995–1996) Offensive coordinator; London Monarchs (1996–1997) Head coach & offensive coordinator; England Monarchs (1998) Head coach

Awards and highlights
- As a player: 4× First-team All-All-AFL (1960–1962, 1965); Second-team All-AFL (1963); 3× AFL All-Star (1961, 1962, 1965); 5× AFL receptions leader (1960–1963, 1965); Denver Broncos Ring of Fame; 2× First-team All-RMAC (1956, 1957); As a coach: 2× Super Bowl champion (IX, X)

Career NFL statistics
- Receptions: 567
- Receiving yards: 7,195
- Receiving touchdowns: 45
- Stats at Pro Football Reference

Head coaching record
- Career: College: 13–41–1 (.245); WLAF: 11–19 (.367)
- Coaching profile at Pro Football Reference

Lionel Thomas Taylor (August 15, 1935 – August 6, 2025) was an American football player and coach. He played professionally as a wide receiver, primarily with the Denver Broncos of American Football League (AFL). Taylor led the league in receptions for five of the first six years of the league's existence. The second player to lead a league in receptions for at least five seasons, Taylor is currently the last to do so. He was the third wide receiver to reach 500 receptions in pro football history. He was also a longtime assistant coach in the league, winning two Super Bowls with the Pittsburgh Steelers. In 2024, he was given the Award of Excellence by the Pro Football Hall of Fame for his work as an assistant.

== Early life ==
Taylor was born on August 15, 1935, in Kansas City, Missouri. He was raised in Lorado, West Virginia, by his stepfather (a coal miner) and mother (a chef), J.C. and Bertha Glend. He attended the segregated Buffalo High School in Accoville, West Virginia, where he played three sports, starring in football and basketball (sometimes known as "Mr. 30" because of his scoring prowess in basketball). He was second-team All-State in football and basketball as a senior, graduating in 1953.

== College football ==
Taylor originally attended West Virginia State College (now West Virginia State University). He played one year of football for the Yellow Jackets. The school was not able to offer any financial assistance through scholarships, and the prospects for its football program being successful were not good.

During this time period, the coach at New Mexico Highlands University (NMHU), located in Las Vegas, New Mexico, was Donnie Gibson, who had been a star football player at Marshall College (now Marshall University) in Huntington, West Virginia. Gibson successfully recruited Taylor from West Virginia State, offering Taylor a full scholarship to play football at NMHU, and Taylor transferred to NMHU. It has also been reported that Gibson's brother and Gibson tried to recruit Taylor out of high school for NMHU, but Taylor chose West Virginia State. After deciding he wanted to leave West Virginia State, Taylor contacted coach Gibson who was still interested in Taylor. Taylor took a three day bus ride to meet with Gibson in Albuquerque; ultimately deciding to transfer to NMHU. He graduated from NMHU in 1958, with a Bachelor of Arts degree.

Taylor earned All-Frontier Conference wide receiver honors in 1955 and 1956. He was honorable mention All-America in 1956. Six NFL teams approached Taylor with offers in 1957.

As a senior in 1957, Gibson made the 22-year old Taylor the team's line, back and/or end coach; and a scout. Taylor was not paid so he could keep his amateur status for basketball season. He was Gibson's sole assistant coach that season, during which he was not eligible to play football because of his one season at West Virginia State.

In addition to football, Taylor starred in basketball for three seasons at NMHU, and was on the track team for one season. Over his basketball career at NMHU, Taylor averaged 22 points per game under Gibson, who also served as the school's basketball coach. He was honorable mention All-Frontier Conference at center in basketball in the 1955-1956 season, and was All-Frontier Conference the following season (1956-57), when he was the second leading scorer in the conference. Gibson believed Taylor could have become a professional basketball player, especially with his good shooting and tough defense.

In the 1956 Frontier Conference championship track meet, Taylor came in first place in the long jump, second place in the discus, and third in the shot put.

Taylor was three years ahead of future NFL lineman Charlie Cowan at Buffalo High School. Like Taylor, Cowan first attended West Virginia State, but Cowan left the school. Returning home to West Virginia during Christmas break, Taylor spoke with Cowan and learned about his situation. Taylor then called coach Gibson and told Gibson he should bring Cowan to NMHU, which Gibson did. Taylor and Cowan played one year together at NMHU. Cowan graduated from NMHU in 1961, and then was an offensive lineman for the Los Angeles Rams in the National Football League (NFL) for 15 years.

== Professional football ==
=== Chicago Bears ===
Taylor was not selected in the NFL draft. In 1958, the Chicago Bears invited him to try out for the team, and signed him to a contract in June 1958. He did not make the Bears, and played semipro football for a team in Bakersfield, California. The Bears brought him back to training camp in 1959. He was on the team for eight games that season, but had no offensive statistics, and did not play in the games for the most part. Taylor was the first NMHU player in the NFL.

He is listed as an offensive end in 1959 Bears rosters. He was a backup to receivers Harlon Hill and Jim Dooley, but did not play much. In a game between the Bears and San Francisco 49ers on October 25, 1959, Taylor is reported at the time to have come into the game as a substitute at end. In a contemporaneous Bears roster for a November 1, 1959 game against the Los Angeles Rams, he is listed as playing end. A December 6, 1959 roster of players for a game between the Bears and Pittsburgh Steelers lists Taylor at halfback. He also played on offense in the 1960 preseason for the Bears. In a mid-August 1960 preseason game between the Bears and New York Giants, Taylor caught a six-yard touchdown pass from Zeke Bratkowski.

Some more recent articles on Taylor, published many decades after his playing career ended, state that he played his eight games with the Bears in 1959 as a linebacker, and that the Denver Broncos would later switch him to a receiver. This appears contrary to other sources, and to contemporaneous newspaper reports from 1959.

=== Denver Broncos ===
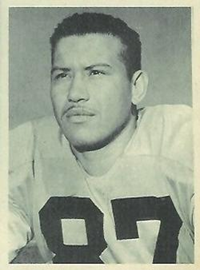
Taylor in 1961.

In 1960, Taylor was considering joining the new American Football League (AFL), which was beginning its first season. He talked it over with George Halas, the Bears owner and coach. Halas gave Taylor two weeks to make up his mind, and Taylor decided on going to the new league.

After being released by the Bears in September 1960, Taylor was signed by the Denver Broncos of the AFL on Friday morning, September 23, 1960. Later that same day, he played wide receiver in his first game for the Broncos (the third game of the team’s season). Taylor had six receptions for 125 yards, and a 32-yard touchdown catch with just minutes to go in the game. In a November 27 game against the Buffalo Bills, Taylor had nine receptions for 199 yards. This included three touchdowns of 80, 24 and 35 yards over a span of 19 minutes.

In 11 starts that season, he led the AFL with 92 receptions; 20 more receptions than the next leading receivers in the AFL. His 1,235 total yards receiving was third best in the AFL, and 12 touchdown receptions were tied for second best. He averaged 102.9 receiving yards per game, second best in the AFL. He was named first-team All-AFL by the Associated Press (AP), United Press International (UPI) and the AFL.

In 1961, he started all 14 games for the Broncos at wide receiver, and became the first AFL or NFL player to catch 100 passes in a season, while also leading the AFL in receptions. He was second in the AFL with 1,176 receiving yards, and had four touchdown receptions. He was selected to play in the first AFL All-Star Game on January 7, 1962. He was again named first-team All-AFL by the AP, UPI and AFL. The only other player ever to have over 100 receptions in a 14-game season was Charley Hennigan for the Houston Oilers in 1964 (101). Since the NFL expanded to playing 16 or more regular season games in a season, in 1978, the feat has been accomplished many times.

He led the AFL again in 1962 with 77 receptions, and had 908 total receiving yards. He was named an AFL All-Star again, and was selected AP first-team All-AFL and UPI second-team All-AFL. In 1963, he led the AFL for a fourth consecutive year with 78 receptions. He had over 1,000 receiving yards for the third time (1,101 yards). He was tied for fourth most with 10 touchdown receptions. UPI named him second-team All-AFL in 1963.

Charley Hennigan led the AFL with 101 receptions in 1964, becoming the first person other than Taylor to lead the AFL in total receptions. Taylor tied for second with 76 receptions. He had 873 receiving yards and seven touchdowns. In 1965, he again led the AFL with 85 receptions (16 more than the second-place receiver). He had the third most receiving yards in the league (1,131 yards). He had six receiving touchdowns that year. The UPI named him first-team All-AFL, as did the AFL, AP, Newspaper Enterprise Association (NEA), and The Sporting News.

In 1966, Taylor again started 14 games, but his reception total fell to 35, for 448 yards and one touchdown. He suffered a knee injury during training camp, but it was not considered serious at the time. During his six years with the Broncos, the team never had a winning season. In July 1967, the Broncos traded Taylor to the Oakland Raiders.

=== Oakland Raiders and Houston Oilers ===
In September 1967, the Raiders put Taylor on the voluntary retired list. Raiders coach John Rauch reported that Taylor was having leg problems and volunteered to retire. At the time he was 30-years old and held the AFL all-time reception record (543).

Taylor later signed with the Houston Oilers in late October, where he played in 1967 and 1968 before retiring in March 1969; but injuries curtailed his effectiveness. Taylor only started six games in 1967, with 18 receptions; and one game in 1968, with six receptions. However, in 1967, he played an important part in Houston winning its division; and his play was cut short in 1968 when he underwent an appendectomy during the season. While with Houston, he worked with receivers coach Fran Polsfoot to develop younger receivers, such as Alvin Reed. Anticipating his future role in football, within months of retiring in 1969, Taylor served as the receivers coach for the college all-stars in the 1969 Chicago College All-Star Game, under head coach Otto Graham.

Taylor finished his AFL career with 567 receptions, 7,195 receiving yards and 45 touchdown receptions. His 567 receptions were fifth best in pro football history when he retired.

== Coaching career ==
After his playing career, Taylor went into a long career as a coach. As one of the first African American coaches and coordinators in the NFL, Hall of Fame coach Tony Dungy said Taylor "'was definitely an inspiration and a role model to my generation of coaches'".

He worked as an assistant coach in the NFL with the Pittsburgh Steelers, Los Angeles Rams and Cleveland Browns. He was an assistant coach (wide receivers) for the Pittsburgh Steelers from 1970 to 1976, where he mentored Hall of Fame receivers Lynn Swann and John Stallworth. The Steelers won Super Bowls IX (1975) and X (1976) during his coaching years in Pittsburgh.

He was the Rams' receivers coach from 1977 to 1979, and then their offensive coordinator from 1980 to 1981. He became the NFL's first, or one of the first, African American coordinators, when he became the Rams offensive coordinator. He reached his third Super Bowl as a coach in the 1979 season, with the Rams losing to the Steelers in Super Bowl XIV, 31–19. In 1980, the Rams were third in the NFL in points scored and second in total yards, but fell off considerably in 1981.

As offensive coordinator, he had an aggressive, big play, strategy. He stated: "'When a long pass is completed to a receiver with defensive guys nearby, people are going to call it lucky . . . But luck isn’t the point. The point is that by designing those plays and throwing the ball you’re giving yourself an opportunity to complete them. You’re giving yourself an opportunity to win with big plays. That’s aggressive football, and that’s what I believe in — an aggressive, intelligent offense.'"

After the Rams, he became the wide receivers coach at Oregon State University (1982-83). He became a head coach for the first time with Texas Southern University, from 1984 to 1988. He was the first Texas Southern Coach to participate in the Labor Day Classic (1985). In 1989, he became tight ends coach for the Cleveland Browns, and then the team's passing coordinator in 1990.

Taylor also coached in Europe. After a four year coaching hiatus, he became the offensive coordinator for the London Monarchs of NFL Europe (1995-96), and then their head coach and offensive coordinator (1996-97). After that, he was head coach and offensive coordinator of the England Monarchs (1998).

== Legacy and honors ==
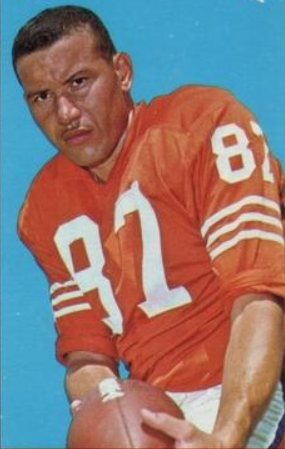
Taylor (pictured in 1965) is currently the last receiver in football history to lead a league five times for receptions.

In 2024, Taylor was among three people to receive the Professional Football Hall of Fame's Award of Excellence for their work as an assistant coach, along with Monte Kiffin and Bill McPherson. During his playing and coaching career, he mentored hundreds of players and coaches, and was highly respected for his qualities as a person and teacher.

In Denver Broncos history, Taylor is third all-time with 71.6 receiving yards per game, fourth all-time in receptions (543) and receiving yards (6,872), and fifth all-time in receiving touchdowns (44) (through the 2024 season). Taylor was the Broncos' team MVP in 1963, 1964 and 1965, and received the Third Down Trophy after each of those seasons. He was an AFL All-Star in 1961, 1962 and 1965. An original Bronco, Taylor was part of the team's inaugural Ring of Fame class in 1984, with Goose Gonsoulin, Floyd Little and Rich Jackson. Along with Lance Alworth, Charlie Hennigan and Sid Blanks, he shares the American Football League record for most receptions in one game with 13, doing so against the Oakland Raiders on November 29, 1964.

He had four 1,000-yard seasons and averaged 84.7 catches per year from 1960 to 1965. As of 2026, his 102.9 receiving yards per game in 1960 remains a Broncos franchise record.

In the time he played (1960–1968), the leading receiver in the AFL outmatched the leading receiver in the NFL each time except 1968. Taylor was the first receiver to have caught more than 90 passes in a single season, and he was also the first to do it twice. No receiver would lead the league in receptions over 90 in two separate seasons until Sterling Sharpe did so in 16-game seasons (1989, 1992, 1993). If considering both AFL and NFL history, the only player to lead one of those leagues in receiving more seasons than Taylor’s five, is legendary Green Bay Packers’ receiver Don Hutson, with eight.

In 2022, the Professional Football Researchers Association named Taylor to the PFRA Hall of Very Good Class of 2022. In 2001, he was inducted into the New Mexico Highlands University Athletics Hall of Fame. He was inducted into the West Virginia Sports Hall of Fame in 1980. In 1970, he was inducted into the Colorado Sports Hall of Fame, the first Bronco to be inducted.

Taylor had a peak from 1960 to 1965 that resulted in 508 receptions for 6,424 yards and 43 touchdowns in 82 games. In that same time, on the NFL side, in 78 games Bobby Mitchell had 338 catches for 5,571 yards and 43 touchdowns. Over his entire 128 game career, Mitchell had 521 receptions for 7,954 yards (53.7 yards per game) and 65 touchdowns; while Taylor had 567 receptions and 7,195 yards in 121 games, with 45 touchdown receptions, for 59.5 yards per game. Mitchell finished his career with more touchdowns and receiving yards than Taylor but had fewer receptions and receiving yards per game. Mitchell has been inducted into the Pro Football Hall of Fame, while Taylor has not.

In addition to being a receiver, however, during his 11 year Hall of Fame career, Mitchell rushed for 2,735 yards on 513 carries (5.3 yards per carry), with 18 rushing touchdowns; averaged 10.1 yards per return on 69 punt returns with three punt return touchdowns; and averaged 26.4 yards per return on 102 kickoff returns with another five return touchdowns. He finished his career with 10,689 yards from scrimmage, 14,078 all-purpose yards and 91 touchdowns. When Taylor left the league, he was the first player with six seasons of at least 75 receptions. No player had six seasons with at least 75 receptions until 1993.

== AFL career statistics ==
Legend
	Led the league
**Bold**	Career high

=== Regular season ===
Year	Team	Games		Receiving				
Year	Team	GP	GS	Rec	Yds	Avg	Lng	TD
1960	DEN	12	11	92	**1,235**	13.4	**80**	**12**
1961	DEN	14	14	**100**	1,176	11.8	52	4
1962	DEN	14	14	77	908	11.8	45	4
1963	DEN	14	14	78	1,101	14.1	72	10
1964	DEN	14	14	76	873	11.5	57	7
1965	DEN	14	14	85	1,131	13.3	63	6
1966	DEN	14	14	35	448	12.8	32	1
1967	HOU	8	6	18	233	12.9	23	1
1968	HOU	9	1	6	90	**15.0**	35	0
		121	102	567	7,195	12.7	80	45

=== Playoffs ===
Year	Team	Games		Receiving				
Year	Team	GP	GS	Rec	Yds	Avg	Lng	TD
1967	HOU	1	1	1	6	6.0	6	0
		1	1	1	6	6.0	6	0

== Personal life ==
During his playing career, he earned a Master's degree in education. After retiring, he and his wife Lorencita (Arquero) Taylor, a native of Cochiti Pueblo in New Mexico, made their home in Littleton, Colorado for a time, before returning to live in New Mexico.

== Illness and death ==
On December 20, 2024, Taylor was hospitalized for a urinary tract infection, spending 69 days there before leaving. He returned in July 2025, staying an additional two weeks before he was placed in hospice care. Taylor died on August 6, 2025, at the age of 89, at his home in Rio Rancho, New Mexico, near Albuquerque. He was survived by his wife of 67 years, Lorencita (Arquero) Taylor, and their two daughters, six grandchildren, seven great-grandchildren, and two great-great-grandchildren.

== Head coaching record ==
=== College ===
Year	Team	Overall	Conference	Standing	Bowl/playoffs
**Texas Southern Tigers** (Southwestern Athletic Conference) (1984–1988)
1984	Texas Southern	5–6	2–5	6th	
1985	Texas Southern	1–10	1–6	7th	
1986	Texas Southern	2–8–1	1–5–1	7th	
1987	Texas Southern	5–6	3–4	T–5th	
1988	Texas Southern	0–11	0–7	8th	
Texas Southern:		13–41–1	7–27–1		
Total:		13–41–1			

== See also ==
- List of American Football League players
