= Charley Cowan =

American football player (1938–1998)

Charlie Cowan
No. 73
- Positions: Tackle, guard

Personal information
- Born: June 19, 1938; Braeholm, West Virginia, U.S.
- Died: April 29, 1998 (aged 59); Los Angeles, California, U.S.
- Listed height: 6 ft 4 in (1.93 m)
- Listed weight: 264 lb (120 kg)

Career information
- High school: Buffalo (WV)
- College: New Mexico Highlands
- NFL draft: 1961: 4th round, 45th overall pick
- AFL draft: 1961: 5th round, 36th overall pick

Career history
- Los Angeles Rams (1961–1975)

Awards and highlights
- 2× Second-team All-Pro (1967, 1968); 3× Pro Bowl (1968–1970)

Career NFL statistics
- Games played: 206
- Games started: 186
- Fumble recoveries: 7
- Stats at Pro Football Reference

Charles Edward "Charlie" Cowan (June 19, 1938 – April 29, 1998) was an American professional football offensive tackle and guard who played fifteen seasons in the National Football League (NFL) with the Los Angeles Rams from 1961 to 1975. He played in three Pro Bowls and was second team All Pro twice.

== Early life ==
Cowan was born on June 19, 1938, in Braeholm, West Virginia. He attended the segregated Buffalo High School in Accoville, Logan County, West Virginia. He played fullback and end on the school's football team. Future American Football League (AFL) star receiver Lionel Taylor was three years ahead of Cowan at Buffalo High. There is a street named after Cowan in Logan County, "Cowan Avenue".

== College football ==
In 1957, Cowan followed Taylor (class of 1959) to New Mexico Highlands University (NMHU). Cowan was a football All-American, and also an All-American on the basketball team. He had the nickname "Humps". He played several positions on NMHU's football team. As in high school, at NMHU Cowan was a ball-carrier at fullback and end, not a lineman.

Taylor and Cowan only played one year together at NMHU, but it was Taylor that led Cowan to the school. After finishing high school, Cowan had left West Virginia State University. When Taylor (who had also left West Virginia State years earlier) learned this from Cowan, Taylor called his NMHU coach Don Gibson and urged him to pursue Cowan. The coach convinced Cowan's parents it would be a good move, and Cowan came to NMHU.

== Professional football ==
The Rams selected Cowan in the fourth round of the 1961 NFL draft (45th overall). He was taken in the fifth round of the 1961 AFL draft by the Denver Broncos. Future Rams teammate Joe Scibelli was taken by the Rams in the 10th round. Cowan and Scibelli would play their entire careers together on the Rams offensive line from 1961 through 1975.

Because of his size, the Rams converted him from a fullback to an offensive lineman beginning in his first year. Cowan doubted himself, but kept going as a lineman because he saw he was making a little progress; and then by the middle of his second season his self-confidence in being a lineman was established. The Rams' confidence in Cowan came earlier, starting when he held his own blocking against Eugene "Big Daddy" Lipscomb in his first game.

Cowan played his first three years at guard, starting 26 games. During his fourth season (1964), he transitioned to right tackle, where he played over four years alongside Scibelli at right guard. In 1969 through the end of his career in 1975, he played right tackle. The 6 ft 4 in (1.93 m), 264 lb (119 kg) Cowan was a huge intimidating presence alongside right guard Hall of Famer Tom Mack from 1966 to 1975, playing seven of those years immediately next to Mack at right tackle. Ken Iman was at center from 1965 to 1974, and Scibelli at right guard from 1961 to 1975.

In that 1961 to 1975 span, the Rams made the playoffs five times (1967, 1969, 1973, 1974, 1975), reaching the NFC championship game of the 1974–75 NFL playoffs and the 1975–76 NFL playoffs, but losing to the Minnesota Vikings and to the Dallas Cowboys, respectively. In the 1974 divisional round, the Rams defeated the Washington Redskins, as Cowan was successful against the opposing the right defensive end Verlon Biggs. In the 1975 divisional round, Doug France started in his place as the Rams defeated the St. Louis Cardinals. Cowan came back to play against the Cowboys, his final game, as the Rams could not get past them. Cowan was replaced by Doug France in 1976.

Cowan was selected three times to play in the Pro Bowl, 1968-1970. The Associated Press (AP) twice named him second-team All Pro in 1968-69, and in 1968, The Sporting News selected Cowan first-team All-Conference.

At the time he retired in 1975, his 206 games as a Ram were the most in team history. He was surpassed the next season by longtime teammate Merlin Olsen, a Hall of fame defensive tackle. They were both later surpassed by Hall of fame offensive lineman Jackie Slater, who played 20 years and 259 regular season games for the Rams.

== Honors ==
Cowan has been inducted into the NMHU Hall of Fame (2002), the West Virginia Sports Hall of Fame (2013), and the New Mexico Sports Hall of Fame (2019). He was named a distinguished alumnus by the NMHU Foundation in 1976.

== Death ==
Cowan died in May 1998 of kidney failure, from which he had been suffering for a decade, undergoing dialysis for years and facing deep financial burdens.
