= Blackwater (coal) =

Liquid waste from coal preparation

Blackwater is a form of pollution produced in coal preparation. In its purification, coal is crushed in a coal preparation plant and then separated and transported as a coal slurry, From the slurry, incombustible materials are removed and the coal can be sized. After the recovery of the coal particles from this slurry, the remaining water is black, contains very fine particles of coal. This blackwater cannot be processed in a water treatment plant.

== Disasters ==
Impoundments for storage of blackwater and other coal-related wastes have a troubled history with often severe environmental consequences.

In February 1972, three dams holding a mixture of coal slurry in Logan County, West Virginia, failed in succession: 130,000,000 US gallons (490,000 m^{3}) of toxic water were released in the Buffalo Creek Flood. As discussed in the book The Buffalo Creek Flood: An Act of Man, out of a population of 5,000 people, 125 people were killed, 1,121 were injured, and over 4,000 were left homeless. The flood caused 50 million dollars in damages. Despite evidence of negligence, the Pittston Coal Company, which owned the compromised dam, called the event an "Act of God".

In 2002, a 900-foot (270 m) high, 2,000-foot (610 m) long valley fill in Lyburn, West Virginia, failed and slid into a sediment pond at the toe of the fill, generating a large wave of water and sediment that destroyed several cars and houses.

=== Other slurry disasters ===
- Buffalo Creek Flood
- Aberfan Disaster
- Martin County sludge spill
- Kingston Fossil Plant coal fly ash slurry spill
- Little Blue Run Lake

== Future technologies ==
The ultimate solution to the blackwater problem is to process coal without the use of water. Such dry-separation technologies are under development.

== Notes ==
- Public Health & Coal Slurry > Coal Slurry ::: Journey Up Coal River
- Coal and Air Pollution | Union of Concerned Scientists
- Department for Natural Resources. Report Of The Black Water Task Force. Rep. Environmental and Public Protection Cabinet, 2005. Web. 27 Jan. 2013.
- Hales, Simon, J. Gohlke, A. Pruess-Ustun, D. Campbell-Lendrum, and A. Woodward. "Mitigation of Climate Change and the Potential Reduction in Global Health Impact of Particulate Air Pollution from Coal Fired Power Station." IOP Conference Series: Earth and Environmental Science 6.58 (2009): 582014. Print.
- King, A. J., Tonkin, Z., and Lieshcke, J. (2012). Short-term effects of a prolonged blackwater event on aquatic fauna in the Murray River, Australia: considerations for future events. Marine and Freshwater Research 63, 576–586.
- Orem, Williams. Research Geochemist, USGS. Coal Slurry: Geochemistry and Impact on Human Health and Environmental Quality.
- Ryan, Barry, Ross Leeder, John T. Price, and John F. Gransden. "The Effect Of Coal Preparation On The Quality Of Clean Coal And Coke." British Columbia Geological Survey, n.d. Web. 27 Jan. 2013.
- "Uses of Coal." World Coal Association. N.p., n.d. Web. 28 Jan. 2013.
