= Amherstdale, West Virginia =

- Census-designated place
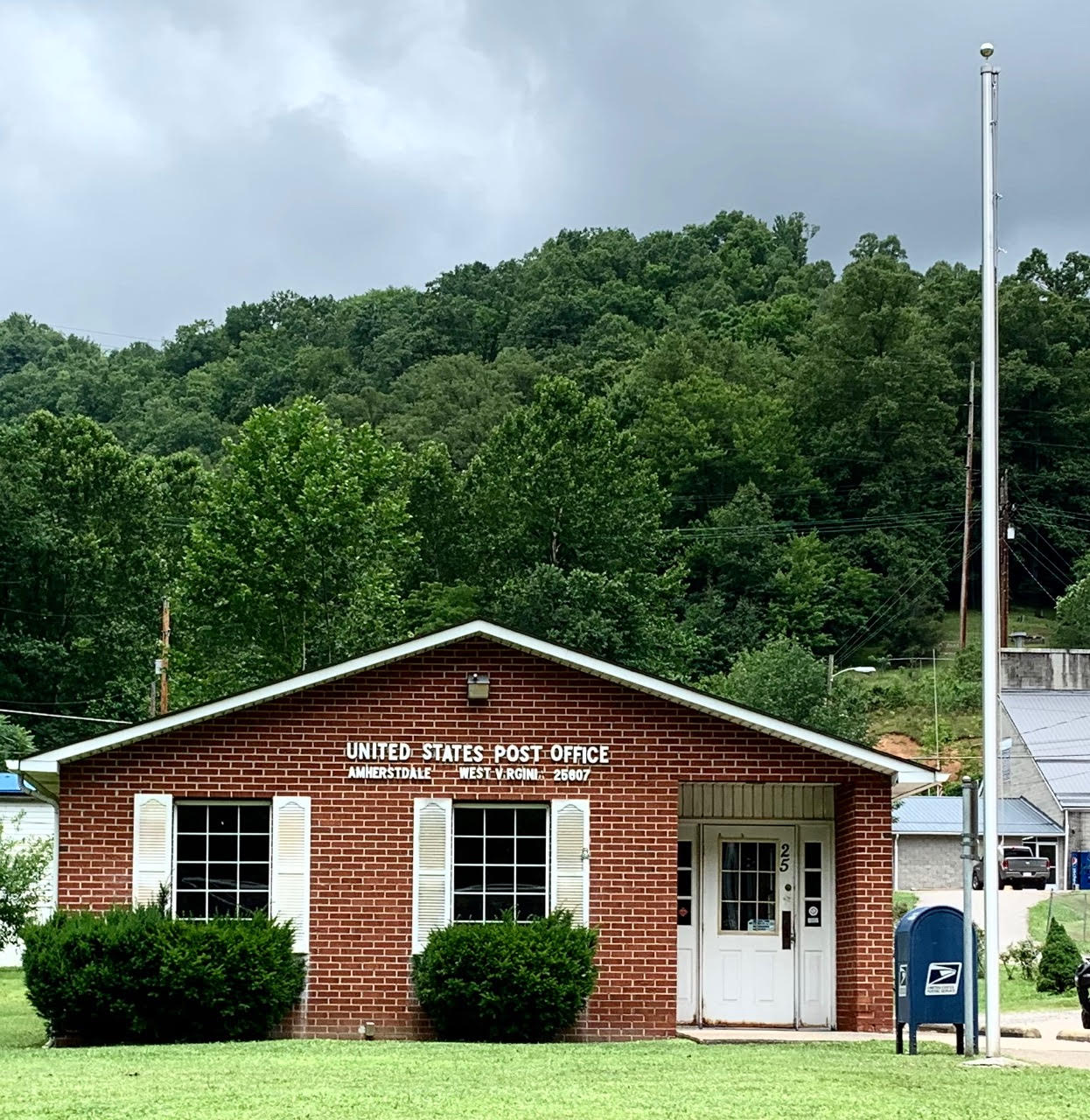
- Amherstdale post office

- Location within West Virginia Location within the United States
- Coordinates: 37°47′07″N 81°48′33″W
- Country: United States
- State: West Virginia
- County: Logan

Area
  - Total: 3.01 sq mi (7.79 km^{2})
  - Land: 2.99 sq mi (7.75 km^{2})
  - Water: 0.019 sq mi (0.05 km^{2})
- Elevation: 896 ft (273 m)

Population (2020)
  - Total: 350
  - Density: 117/sq mi (45.2/km^{2})
- Time zone: UTC-5 (Eastern (EST))
  - Summer (DST): UTC-4 (EDT)
- ZIP code: 25607
- Area codes: 304 & 681
- GNIS feature ID: 1534919
- FIPS code: 54-01660

Amherstdale is a census-designated place (CDP) in Logan County, West Virginia, United States, situated along Buffalo Creek. The CDP includes the unincorporated communities of Amherstdale, Becco, Fanco, and Braeholm. The CDP population was 350 as of the 2020 census, no change from the 2010 census.

Prior to 2010, Amherstdale was part of the Amherstdale-Robinette CDP. Amherstdale has a post office with ZIP code 25607.

Amherstdale was also affected by the Buffalo Creek flood disaster which killed, injured, and left thousands homeless.

== Geography ==
Amherstdale is in southeastern Logan County, in the valley of Buffalo Creek. It is bordered to the west and south by the Accoville CDP and to the east by Robinette. By road, Amherstdale is 5.5 miles (8.9 km) northeast of Man, at the confluence of Buffalo Creek with the Guyandotte River, and 9 miles (14 km) west of Saunders at the head of the Buffalo Creek valley.

According to the U.S. Census Bureau, the Amherstdale CDP has a total area of 3.0 square miles (7.8 km^{2}), of which 0.02 square miles (0.05 km^{2}), or 0.59%, are water.
