= Kistler, West Virginia =

- Census-designated place
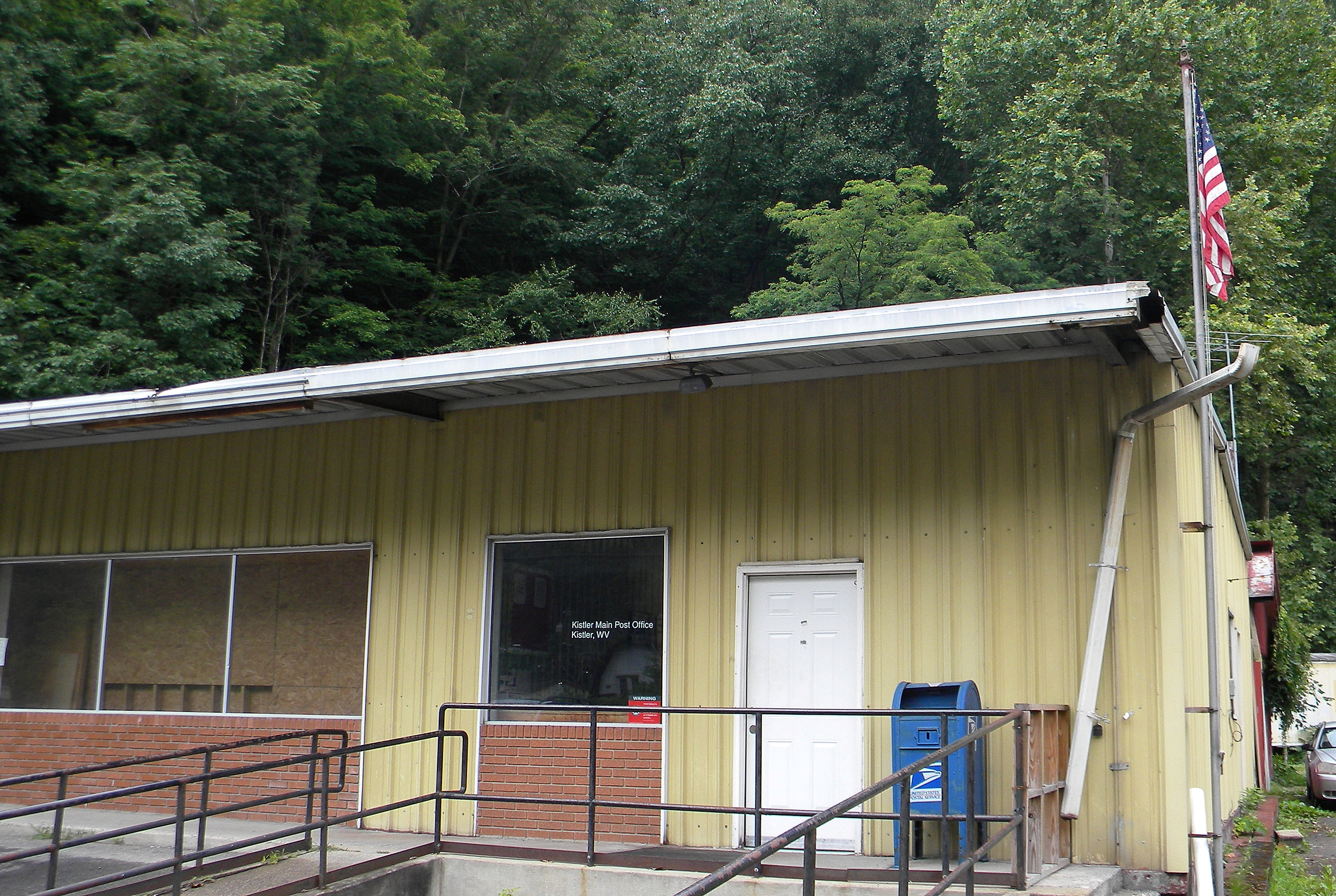
- Kistler post office

- Location within West Virginia Location within the United States
- Coordinates: 37°45′22″N 81°51′36″W
- Country: United States
- State: West Virginia
- County: Logan

Area
  - Total: 1.494 sq mi (3.87 km^{2})
  - Land: 1.486 sq mi (3.85 km^{2})
  - Water: 0.008 sq mi (0.021 km^{2})
- Elevation: 774 ft (236 m)

Population (2020)
  - Total: 420
  - Density: 355.3/sq mi (137.2/km^{2})
- Time zone: UTC-5 (Eastern (EST))
  - Summer (DST): UTC-4 (EDT)
- ZIP Code: 25628
- Area codes: 304 & 681
- GNIS feature ID: 1541251
- FIPS code: 54-44188

Kistler is an unincorporated community and census-designated place (CDP) in Logan County, West Virginia, United States. As of the 2020 census, its population was 420 (down from 528 at the 2010 census).

== Geography ==
Kistler is in southern Logan County, 1.5 miles (2.4 km) northeast of Man, along Buffalo Creek. It is bordered to the northeast (upstream) by Accoville.

According to the U.S. Census Bureau, the Kistler CDP has a total area of 1.494 square miles (3.87 km^{2}), of which 1.486 square miles (3.85 km^{2}) are land and 0.008 square miles (0.021 km^{2}), or 0.54%, are water. The community was affected by the Buffalo Creek flood in 1972.
