= Amherstdale-Robinette, West Virginia =

- Former CDP
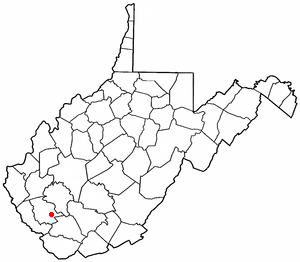
- Location of Amherstdale-Robinette, West Virginia
- Coordinates: 37°47′7″N 81°47′34″W
- Country: United States
- State: West Virginia
- County: Logan

Area
  - Total: 17.8 sq mi (46.1 km^{2})
  - Land: 17.8 sq mi (46.1 km^{2})
  - Water: 0 sq mi (0.0 km^{2})

Population (2000)
  - Total: 1,785
  - Density: 100/sq mi (38.7/km^{2})
- Time zone: UTC-5 (Eastern (EST))
  - Summer (DST): UTC-4 (EDT)
- Area code: 304
- FIPS code: 54-01672

Amherstdale-Robinette is a former census-designated place (CDP) in Logan County, West Virginia, United States. The population was 1,785 at the 2000 census. For the 2010 census, the place was split into two CDPs, Amherstdale and Robinette.

== Geography ==
Amherstdale-Robinette is located at 37°47′7″N 81°47′34″W (37.785295, -81.792749, along Buffalo Creek.

According to the United States Census Bureau, the CDP has a total area of 17.8 square miles (46.1 km^{2}), all of it land.

== Demographics ==
As of the census of 2000, there were 1,785 people, 677 households, and 519 families residing in the CDP. The population density was 100.3 people per square mile (38.7/km^{2}). There were 735 housing units at an average density of 41.3/sq mi (15.9/km^{2}). The racial makeup of the CDP was 96.47% White, 2.75% African American, 0.06% Native American, 0.06% Asian, 0.06% from other races, and 0.62% from two or more races. Hispanic or Latino of any race were 0.90% of the population.

There were 677 households, out of which 32.9% had children under the age of 18 living with them, 61.4% were married couples living together, 11.4% had a female householder with no husband present, and 23.3% were non-families. 21.1% of all households were made up of individuals, and 9.6% had someone living alone who was 65 years of age or older. The average household size was 2.62 and the average family size was 3.03.

In the CDP, the population was spread out, with 22.8% under the age of 18, 10.5% from 18 to 24, 28.1% from 25 to 44, 27.2% from 45 to 64, and 11.4% who were 65 years of age or older. The median age was 39 years. For every 100 females, there were 95.5 males. For every 100 females age 18 and over, there were 89.0 males.

The median income for a household in the CDP was $28,512, and the median income for a family was $38,424. Males had a median income of $35,500 versus $15,000 for females. The per capita income for the CDP was $15,024. About 18.5% of families and 23.3% of the population were below the poverty line, including 34.2% of those under age 18 and 11.2% of those age 65 or over.
