= Logan Coalfield =

Coordinates: 37°47′N 81°56′W

The Logan Coalfield is a coalfield located in Logan County and Wyoming County of southern West Virginia, in the Appalachia region of the eastern United States.

It is part of the National Coal Heritage Area. Coal is still mined from the Logan Coalfield, but it is no longer one of the top producing coalfields in West Virginia.

== History ==
The coalfield has been a large source of high-quality, high-volatile bituminous coal since the field was opened by the completion of the Chesapeake & Ohio Railway (C&O) in 1904. The C&O maintained a rail yard in the district at Peach Creek. Later the Virginian Railway built the "Gilbert Extension" which allowed the shipment of coal from western Wyoming County. Both steam coal and metallurgical coal have been extracted from such seams as the Cedar Grove, Eagle, Alma, and Winifrede.

The coalfield is primarily drained by the Guyandotte River, and there were mines, such as Earling, Lyburn, and Marianna in this main river valley. There has also been heavy mining in tributary hollows of the Guyandotte, such as Island Creek, Rum Creek, and Buffalo Creek. Most coal mining in the Logan Coalfield has been south of the town of Logan, but there were a few coal mines north of Logan and into Lincoln County as well.

This coalfield hosted notable events from the Mine Wars, particularly Logan County Sheriff Don Chafin's victory over UMWA invaders at the Battle of Blair Mountain.

=== Disasters ===
The Logan Coalfield is the site of the Holden 22 Mine disaster. It is also the location of the Buffalo Creek Flood, when a Pittston Coal Company coal refuse dam burst at Buffalo Creek in 1972 and resulted in the death of 125 people and the destruction of about a dozen towns. In 2008 a new coal mine and preparation plant opened at the site of the Pittston refuse dam. More recently the Massey Energy Bandmill preparation plant had a fire in August 2009, resulting in the closure of the plant. This plant processed coal from several mines, including the Aracoma Mine, where two miners lost their lives in a beltline fire, known as the Aracoma Alma Mine accident, in 2006.

== See also ==
- Coal mining in Appalachia
- Coal mining regions in the United States
- Mining in West Virginia
