= Crown, West Virginia =

Crown may refer to the following communities in West Virginia:

- Crown, Logan County, West Virginia
- Crown, Monongalia County, West Virginia
