= Pardee, West Virginia =

- Unincorporated community
- Location within West Virginia Location within the United States
- Coordinates: 37°48′21″N 81°42′05″W
- Country: United States
- State: West Virginia
- County: Logan
- Elevation: 1,289 ft (393 m)
- Time zone: UTC-5 (Eastern (EST))
  - Summer (DST): UTC-4 (EDT)
- Area codes: 304 & 681
- GNIS feature ID: 1555305

Pardee is an unincorporated community in Logan County, West Virginia, United States. Pardee is located on County Route 16 and Buffalo Creek, 10.7 miles (17.2 km) east-northeast of Man.
