= Accoville, West Virginia =

- Census-designated place
- Location within West Virginia Location within the United States
- Coordinates: 37°46′7″N 81°50′13″W
- Country: United States
- State: West Virginia
- County: Logan

Area
  - Total: 3.23 sq mi (8.37 km^{2})
  - Land: 3.22 sq mi (8.35 km^{2})
  - Water: 0.0077 sq mi (0.02 km^{2})
- Elevation: 830 ft (250 m)

Population (2020)
  - Total: 599
  - Density: 178/sq mi (68.7/km^{2})
- Time zone: UTC-5 (Eastern (EST))
  - Summer (DST): UTC-4 (EDT)
- ZIP code: 25606
- Area codes: 304 & 681
- FIPS code: 54-00196
- GNIS feature ID: 1534798

Accoville is an unincorporated community and census-designated place (CDP) in Logan County, West Virginia, United States. The community lies along Buffalo Creek. As of the 2020 United States census, its population was 599 (up from 574 at the 2010 census).

== Geography ==
Accoville is in southeastern Logan County, in the valley of Buffalo Creek, and extending to the east up its Right Fork. It is bordered by Amherstdale to the northeast (up Buffalo Creek) and by Kistler to the southwest (down the creek). Logan, the county seat, is 16 miles (26 km) to the northwest, down Buffalo Creek and then the Guyandotte River.

According to the U.S. Census Bureau, the Accoville CDP has a total area of 3.2 square miles (8.4 km^{2}), of which 0.0 square miles (0.02 km^{2}), or 0.21%, are water.

== History ==
Accoville derived its name from the local Amherst Coal Company (ACCO).

Accoville was in the path of the Buffalo Creek flood in 1972. The devastating man made disaster was caused by a Coal Mine dam failure located by a hillside.

Accoville's Don Israel Bragg, 33, was killed in the 2006 Aracoma Alma Mine disaster in Melville, along with Ellery Hatfield, 47, of Simon.

== Notable people ==
Accoville is the birthplace of Ted Belcher, a U.S. Army soldier and recipient of the U.S. military's highest decoration, the Medal of Honor, for his actions in the Vietnam War.
