= Becco, West Virginia =

Unincorporated community in West Virginia, United States

- Unincorporated community
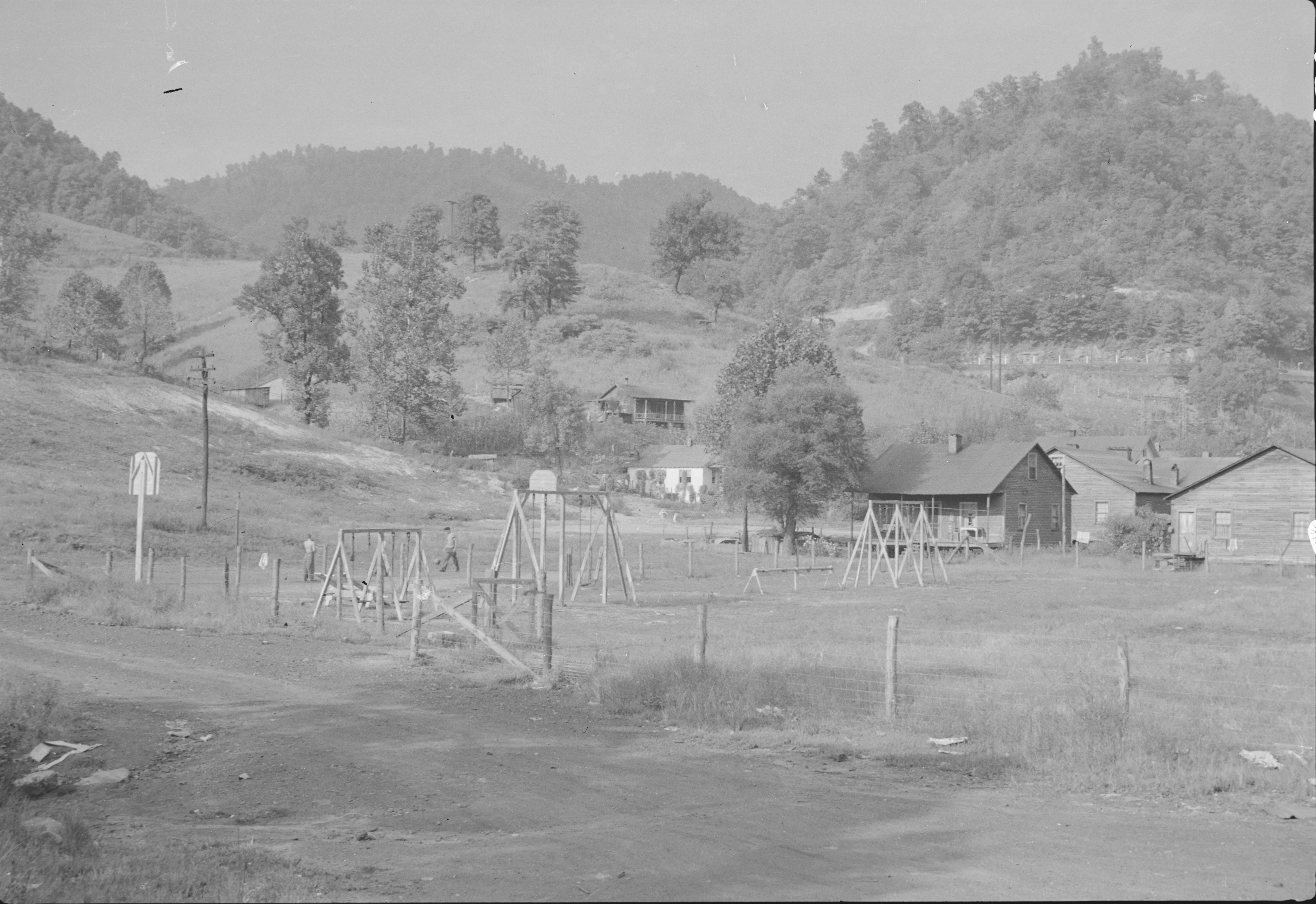

- Location within West Virginia Location within the United States
- Coordinates: 37°47′00″N 81°48′51″W
- Country: United States
- State: West Virginia
- County: Logan
- Elevation: 889 ft (271 m)
- Time zone: UTC-5 (Eastern (EST))
  - Summer (DST): UTC-4 (EDT)
- Area codes: 304 & 681
- GNIS feature ID: 1553830

Becco is an unincorporated community in Logan County, West Virginia, United States. Becco is located on County Route 16 and Buffalo Creek, 4.6 miles (7.4 km) northeast of Man. Its population is included as part of the Amherstdale census-designated place.

The community is named for the Buffalo Eagle Colliery Company (BECCO).
