= Crites, West Virginia =

Unincorporated community in West Virginia, United States

- Unincorporated community
- Location within West Virginia Location within the United States
- Coordinates: 37°47′54″N 81°45′43″W
- Country: United States
- State: West Virginia
- County: Logan
- Elevation: 1,037 ft (316 m)
- Time zone: UTC-5 (Eastern (EST))
  - Summer (DST): UTC-4 (EDT)
- Area codes: 304 & 681
- GNIS feature ID: 1554224

Crites is an unincorporated community in Logan County, West Virginia, United States, on County Route 16 and Buffalo Creek, 7.5 miles (12.1 km) east-northeast of Man.
