= Braeholm, West Virginia =

Unincorporated community in West Virginia, United States

- Unincorporated place
- Location within West Virginia Location within the United States
- Coordinates: 37°46′30″N 81°49′17″W
- Country: United States
- State: West Virginia
- County: Logan
- Elevation: 863 ft (263 m)
- Time zone: UTC-5 (Eastern (EST))
  - Summer (DST): UTC-4 (EDT)
- Postal code: 25607
- Area codes: 304 & 681
- GNIS feature ID: 1553963

Braeholm is an unincorporated community in Logan County, West Virginia, United States. It is within the Amherstdale census-designated place.

Braeholm is located on County Route 16 and Buffalo Creek, 3.9 miles (6.3 km) northeast of Man.

Braeholm was affected by the Buffalo Creek flood which killed and injured, and left many people homeless.
