= Craneco, West Virginia =

Unincorporated community in West Virginia, United States

- Unincorporated community
- Location within West Virginia Location within the United States
- Coordinates: 37°47′48″N 81°43′55″W
- Country: United States
- State: West Virginia
- County: Logan
- Elevation: 1,168 ft (356 m)
- Time zone: UTC-5 (Eastern (EST))
  - Summer (DST): UTC-4 (EDT)
- Area codes: 304 & 681
- GNIS feature ID: 1554216

Craneco is an unincorporated community in Logan County, West Virginia, United States. Craneco is located on County Route 16 and Buffalo Creek, 8.9 miles (14.3 km) east-northeast of Man.

The name Craneco is an amalgamation of Cole and Crane, a business in the lumber industry.
