= Aracoma Alma Mine accident =

2006 mining disaster in West Virginia, United States

Coordinates: 37.82°N 81.90°W

- Collapsed roof from the Aracoma Alma Mine accident.
- Date: At approximately 5:14 p.m. on January 19, 2006
- Location: Aracoma Alma Mine No. 1 at Melville in Logan County, West Virginia
- Cause: Coal mine fire
- Deaths: Two men: Ellery Hatfield, 47; Don Bragg, 33

On the morning of January 19, 2006, a conveyor belt in the Aracoma Alma Mine No. 1 at Melville, West Virginia, caught fire, pouring smoke through the gaps in the wall and into the fresh air passageway that the miners were supposed to use for their escape, obscuring their vision and ultimately leading to the death of two of them. The two men, Ellery Hatfield, 47 and Don Bragg, 33, died of carbon monoxide poisoning when they became separated from 10 other members of their crew. The others held hands and edged through the air intake amid dense smoke.

At the time of the fire, the mine was owned by Aracoma Coal Company, Inc., which was a Massey Energy affiliated company.

The Federal Mine Safety and Health Administration issued an advisory to its 11 District Offices to check for any missing stoppings in other mines. Inspectors were advised that two such walls—each 18 feet (5.5 m) long and 6 feet (1.8 m) high—were missing in the Alma mine when investigators arrived. If the wall sections had been in place, they would have prevented any exchange of air between the conveyor belt and the fresh air intake, the primary source of air for workers inside the mine. Instead, investigators now believe, smoke flooded into the air intake, which also serves as an escape route, disorienting two of the miners, who became lost and died in the fire. The accident followed national media attention of the Sago Mine disaster, which had occurred earlier in the month.

On January 15, 2009, the Charleston Gazette reported that Aracoma widows, Delorice Bragg and Freda Hatfield, urged Federal District Judge Judge John T. Copenhaver to reject Massey Energy's plea bargain and record-setting $2.5 million (~$3.64 million in 2025) fine for criminal charges, the highest fine ever for a mine safety violation. Bragg's widow stated that it was clear "that Massey executives much farther up the line expected the Alma Mine to emphasize production over the safety of the coal miners inside." Massey is also required to pay $1.7 million (~$2.45 million in 2025) in civil fines for the accident.

On July 20, 2010, West Virginia residents Michael Plumley of Delbarton, Donald Hagy Jr. of Gilbert; Edward Ellis Jr. of Justice; and Terry Shadd of Chapmanville, pleaded guilty to federal charges related to the accident. All four were foremen at the mine and each was charged with failing to conduct escapeway drills as mandated under §75.383(b). Plumley's charge states that, as a section foreman, he did not conduct escapeway drills in the No. 2 Section of the Alma Mine from October 2005 to January 19, 2006. Ellis, a longwall section foreman, was charged with failing to conduct escapeway drills in the longwall section during this same time period. Hagy's charge is that, as a foreman, he failed to conduct escapeway drills from June 2005 to October 2005. Shadd's charges stem from failing to conduct escapeway drills in the No. 2 Section of the mine from May 2005 to July 2005. On December 9, 2010, Plumley, Hagy, Ellis, and Shadd were each sentenced to one year probation and each was ordered to pay a fine.On July 11, 2014, the families of Don Israel Bragg and Ellery Hatfield settled a Federal Tort Claims Act Lawsuit for $1 million (~$1.34 million in 2025) with the U.S. government. In addition to the monetary considerations, the United States government and families agreed to the following: 1) The Mine Safety and Health Administration ("MSHA") will provide plaintiffs with an unredacted copy of the independent review interview given by Richard E. Stickler on November 9, 2007, and Kevin Stricklin on November 7, 2007, as part of the Crandall Canyon Investigation, insofar as they were speaking about Aracoma, but subject to the protective order entered in this action. 2) MSHA will provide plaintiffs with hard copies of and electronic links to Congressional statements and news releases concerning the implementation of the Miner Act for the years 2006 and 2007. 3) MSHA will develop a course at the National Mine Safety and Health Academy open to the nationwide mining community on fire prevention in underground Coal and Non-Metal Mines.

On the first day of the class, the Bragg and Hatfield families will be invited as honored guests. During the opening remarks by the Assistant Secretary for Mine Safety & Health, the victims of the Aracoma Fire will be remembered and mentioned as an example of the lives that can possibly be saved through proper fire prevention and fire escape techniques and the reason this course is being offered. The course will highlight innovative techniques, as well as existing safe practices to enhance fire prevention and fire escape and response. 4) MSHA will dedicate a plaque in honor of Bragg and Hatfield; the plaque will be located at the Firefighting Training Pad at the National Mine Academy. The families will be invited to the dedication, which may be done at the same time as the first day of the training class on fire prevention. As further consideration hereof, the plaintiffs hereby agree to dismiss with prejudice all claims asserted by them in Civil Action No. 2:10-cv-0683 pending in the United States District Court for the Southern District of West Virginia, and to execute a dismissal order relative to the same, dismissing all claims and causes of action, with prejudice, and with the parties bearing their respective costs and attorneys' fees.

== See also ==
- 2006 Sago Mine disaster
- Buffalo Creek flood
- Logan Coalfield
- Upper Big Branch Mine disaster

== Sources ==
- "Accidents at Logan County mine". Charleston Daily Mail. Archived from the original on May 15, 2011.
- "Bodies of 2 Miners Found After W.Va. Fire". ABC News. Archived from the original on June 29, 2011.
- "Bodies of miners found". CNN.com. Archived from the original on February 9, 2006.
- "Melville shows its spirit in mine accident". Huntington Herald-Dispatch.
- Urbina, Ian; Gately, Gary (January 21, 2006). "Smoke Hampers Rescuers Searching for Two Inside West Virginia Mine". The New York Times. Archived from the original on May 14, 2011.
- "Trapped US coal miners found dead". BBC News and Current Affairs. January 22, 2006.
- "UPDATE 4-Two W.Virginia miners dead; governor vows action". Reuters.
- Urbina, Ian (January 22, 2006). "With Mine Fire Contained, Rescue Efforts Are Expanded". The New York Times.
- Roddy, Dennis B. (March 23, 2006). "Missing wall key to Alma mine accident that killed two". Post-gazette.com. Archived from the original on May 26, 2006.
