= Stowe, West Virginia =

- Unincorporated community
- Location within West Virginia Location within the United States
- Coordinates: 37°48′22″N 81°45′31″W
- Country: United States
- State: West Virginia
- County: Logan
- Elevation: 1,060 ft (320 m)
- Time zone: UTC-5 (Eastern (EST))
  - Summer (DST): UTC-4 (EDT)
- Area codes: 304 & 681
- GNIS feature ID: 1555725

Stowe is an unincorporated community in Logan County, West Virginia, United States. Stowe is located on County Route 16 and Buffalo Creek, 8 miles (13 km) east-northeast of Man.
