= Lundale, West Virginia =

- Unincorporated community
- Location within West Virginia Location within the United States
- Coordinates: 37°48′04″N 81°44′39″W
- Country: United States
- State: West Virginia
- County: Logan
- Elevation: 1,122 ft (342 m)
- Time zone: UTC-5 (Eastern (EST))
  - Summer (DST): UTC-4 (EDT)
- Area codes: 304 & 681
- GNIS feature ID: 1555010

Lundale is an unincorporated community in Logan County, West Virginia, United States. Lundale is 8.5 miles (13.7 km) northeast of Man, along Buffalo Creek.
