= Latrobe, West Virginia =

- Unincorporated community
- Location within West Virginia Location within the United States
- Coordinates: 37°47′26″N 81°46′07″W
- Country: United States
- State: West Virginia
- County: Logan
- Elevation: 1,010 ft (310 m)
- Time zone: UTC-5 (Eastern (EST))
  - Summer (DST): UTC-4 (EDT)
- Area codes: 304 & 681
- GNIS feature ID: 1554914

Latrobe is an unincorporated community and coal town in Logan County, West Virginia, United States. Latrobe is located on County Route 16 and Buffalo Creek, 6.9 miles (11.1 km) east-northeast of Man.
