= Robinette, West Virginia =

- Census-designated place
- Location within West Virginia Location within the United States
- Coordinates: 37°47′06″N 81°47′37″W
- Country: United States
- State: West Virginia
- County: Logan

Area
  - Total: 3.020 sq mi (7.82 km^{2})
  - Land: 3.001 sq mi (7.77 km^{2})
  - Water: 0.019 sq mi (0.049 km^{2})
- Elevation: 942 ft (287 m)

Population (2020)
  - Total: 567
  - Density: 189/sq mi (72.9/km^{2})
- Time zone: UTC-5 (Eastern (EST))
  - Summer (DST): UTC-4 (EDT)
- ZIP code: 25607
- Area codes: 304 & 681
- GNIS feature ID: 1552694
- FIPS code: 54-69100

Robinette is an unincorporated community and census-designated place (CDP) in Logan County, West Virginia, United States, along Buffalo Creek. Its population was 567 as of the 2020 census (down from 663 at the 2010 census). Prior to 2010, Robinette was part of the Amherstdale-Robinette CDP.

== Geography ==
Robinette is in southeastern Logan County and is bordered to the west by Amherstdale. Buffalo Creek Road is the main road through the community, following the Buffalo Creek valley. It leads southwest (downstream) 6 miles (10 km) to Man, on the Guyandotte River, and east (upstream) 12 miles (19 km) to the head of the valley.

According to the U.S. Census Bureau, the Robinette CDP has a total area of 3.0 square miles (7.8 km^{2}), of which 0.02 square miles (0.05 km^{2}), or 0.62%, are water.
