= Bus Cook =

American sports agent

James "Bus" Cook
- Born: Man, West Virginia
- Education: University of Mississippi
- Occupations: Sports agent, lawyer
- Employer: BC Sports Agency

James "Bus" Cook is an NFL sports agent.

== Early life ==
Cook was born and raised in Man, West Virginia. Cook attended American University on a basketball scholarship. In 1970, he enrolled in law school at the University of Mississippi. He received his law degree in 1974 and began working as an attorney for Fairchild Construction Company in Hattiesburg, a job he held until he saved up enough money to open his own private practice in 1976. After ten years, he briefly looked into the possibility of representing NBA players, but that didn't work out and Cook had no further plans of venturing into the world of sports agency until he met Favre.

== Career ==
Cook's first client as a sports agent was Brett Favre, after the two hit it off playing golf in Mississippi. Cook's next client was quarterback Steve McNair. In 2001, Cook negotiated the NFL's first $100 million contract, when Brett Favre signed a lifetime extension of his contract with the Green Bay Packers.

Some of Cook's notable clients have included Calvin Johnson, Randy Moss, Marcedes Lewis, Adalius Thomas, Michael Turner, Jerious Norwood, Tony Scheffler, Cam Newton, and Russell Wilson. In 2014, Cook signed Jadeveon Clowney and Eric Ebron.

=== Career controversies ===
Cook has been criticized for his involvement in the controversial career decisions of his clients, particularly Favre and Cutler in the 2008 and 2009 seasons. Cook responded to these in an interview with Sports Business Journal saying:

"I heard I am trying to sell my business, I am not trying to sell my business. I don’t know who brings all these things up. I guess there are a lot of agents selling their businesses these days, or they are merging more than selling."

Cook was at the center of Brett Favre's indecision on whether to retire during three straight NFL off-seasons from 2008 to 2010. In the summer of 2010, Favre mentioned to Ed Werder of ESPN that it was possible that he would need ankle surgery. Cook took exception to Favre's admission and was quoted in an interview in the August 2010 edition of Men's Journal as saying:

“Brett talked to goddamned Ed Werder at ESPN, says he needs ankle surgery. Now why did he do that? I’ve got (Minnesota Viking coach, Brad) Childress calling. I’ve got reporters calling all damn morning. Goddammit, why does he have to be such a goddamned drama queen? Play, don’t play, goddamn, people are getting sick of it. I’m getting sick of it! Why does he have to talk to these people? What good does it do? Ed Werder at ESPN! What’s he ever done for anybody other than say, ‘Look, look, Mommy, I got this first, ain’t I special?’ You got problems with surgery, talk to your wife. Why talk to goddamned Ed Werder?”

Favre would respond that Cook's comments were taken out of context, and that Cook was "joking around," but also added that "the lesson to be learned in all that is, I hate to even say it, is that you can't trust anybody."
