= Ulysses Hinchman =

19th century American politician

Member of the West Virginia House of Delegates from the Logan County, West Virginia district
- In office 1866–1869

Ulysses Hinchman was a member of the House of Delegates of West Virginia, United States, representing Logan County from 1866 to 1869.

Hinchman was a practicing physician who also was Logan County's census taker, and commissioner of school lands.

The town of Man, West Virginia, is named for the last syllable of Hinchman's name.
