= Crown, Logan County, West Virginia =

Unincorporated community in West Virginia, United States

Crown, West Virginia
- Unincorporated community
- Location within West Virginia Location within the United States
- Coordinates: 37°45′30″N 81°50′38″W
- Country: United States
- State: West Virginia
- County: Logan
- Elevation: 814 ft (248 m)
- Time zone: UTC-5 (Eastern (EST))
  - Summer (DST): UTC-4 (EDT)
- Area codes: 304 & 681
- GNIS feature ID: 1554230

Crown is an unincorporated community in Logan County, West Virginia, United States. Crown is located on County Route 16 and Buffalo Creek, 2.25 miles (3.62 km) northeast of Man.

Crown was so named on account of its lofty elevation. An older name for Crown is Lax or Lax Station.
