= Melville, West Virginia =

- Unincorporated community
- Location within West Virginia Location within the United States
- Coordinates: 37°50′29″N 81°56′41″W
- Country: United States
- State: West Virginia
- County: Logan
- Time zone: UTC-5 (Eastern (EST))
  - Summer (DST): UTC-4 (EDT)
- GNIS feature ID: 1555106

Melville is an unincorporated community in Logan County, West Virginia, United States. The community of Melville was established in 1967.

== Mining accident ==
Melville is the location of the Aracoma Alma Mine No. 1 that caught fire on January 19, 2006, killing two miners. Melville's Bright Star Freewill Baptist Church served as the location for dissemination of information during the search for the miners and as a place for families and friends to keep vigil.
