= Saunders, West Virginia =

- Unincorporated community
- Location within West Virginia Location within the United States
- Coordinates: 37°47′59″N 81°40′20″W
- Country: United States
- State: West Virginia
- County: Logan
- Elevation: 1,463 ft (446 m)
- Time zone: UTC-5 (Eastern (EST))
  - Summer (DST): UTC-4 (EDT)
- Area codes: 304 & 681
- GNIS feature ID: 1555576

Saunders (also known as Right Fork, Three Fork and Three Forks) is an unincorporated community in Logan County, West Virginia, United States. Saunders is located on County Highway 16 near Buffalo Creek, 12 miles (19 km) east-northeast of Man.
