= The Buffalo Creek Flood: An Act of Man =

1975 film

- Directed by: Mimi Pickering
- Cinematography: Mimi Pickering / a.o.
- Edited by: Mimi Pickering
- Distributed by: Appalshop
- Release date: 1975
- Running time: 40 min.
- Country: United States
- Language: English

The Buffalo Creek Flood: An Act of Man is a 1975 American documentary film produced by Appalshop and directed by Mimi Pickering.

== Summary ==
The film is about the Buffalo Creek Flood, an incident that occurred on February 26, 1972, when the Pittston Coal Company's coal slurry impoundment dam in Logan County, West Virginia burst four days after having been declared 'satisfactory' by a federal mine inspector. The film includes interviews with survivors, mining officials, and union representatives, along with footage of the flood itself.

== Legacy ==
In 2005, this film was selected for preservation in the United States National Film Registry by the Library of Congress as being "culturally, historically, or aesthetically significant".

== See also ==
- List of American films of 1975
- Harlan County U.S.A.
