= Buffalo Creek (Guyandotte River tributary) =

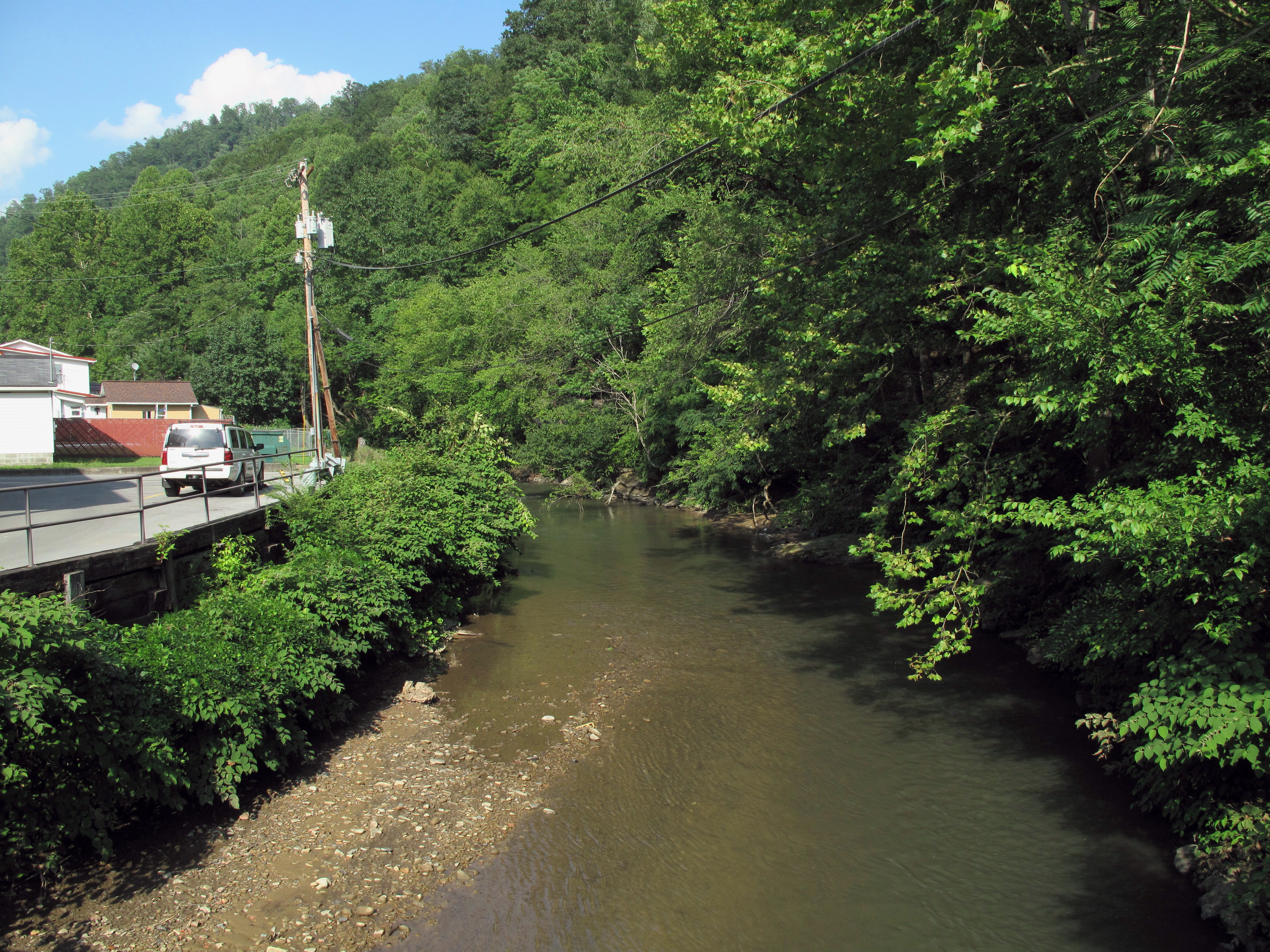
- Buffalo Creek in Man in 2010

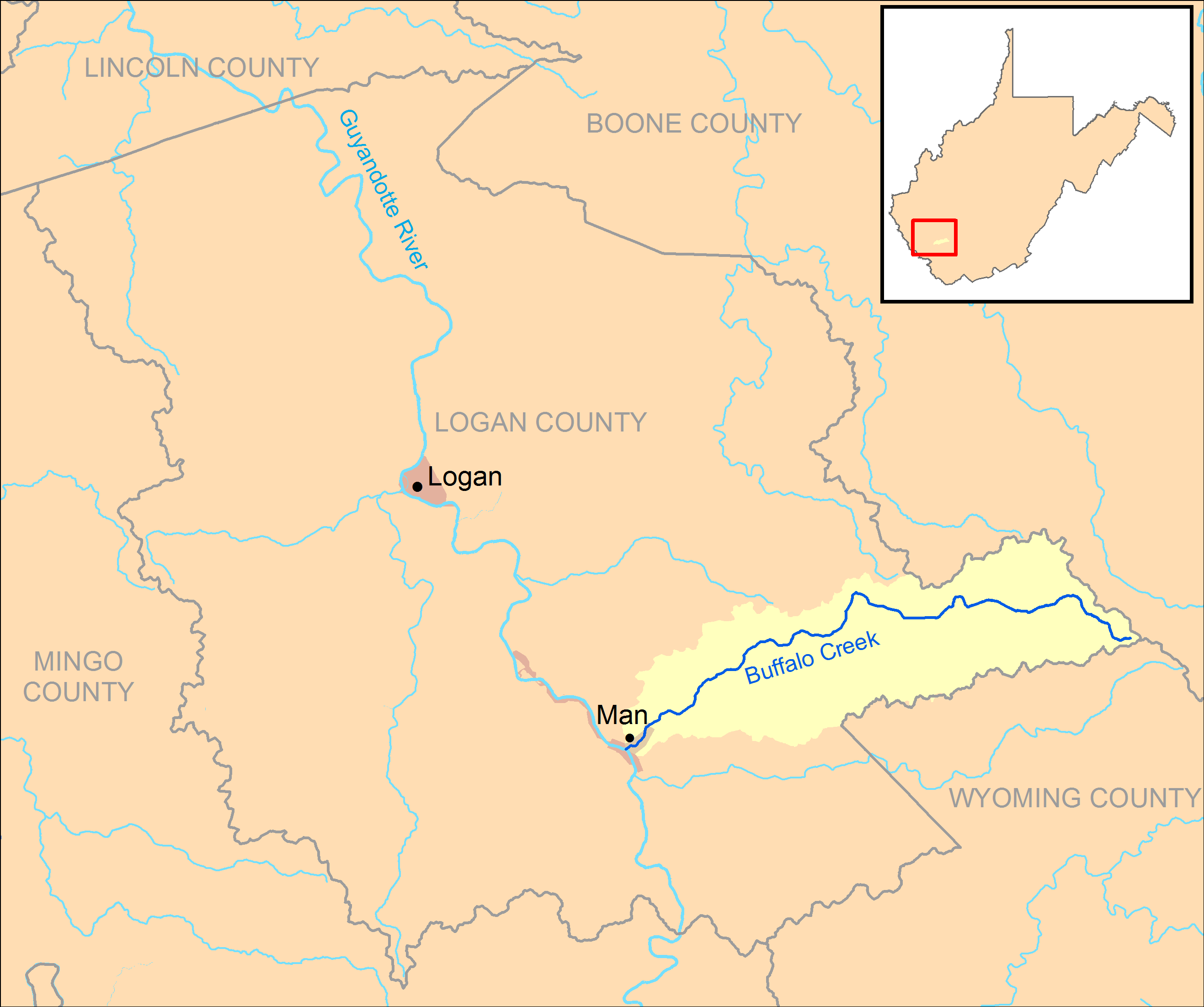
- Buffalo Creek and its watershed in Logan County, West Virginia

Location
- Country: United States
- State: West Virginia
- County: Logan County

Physical characteristics
- Source
  - location: east of Saunders
  - coordinates: 37.7903875°N 81.6114994°W
  - elevation: 2,602 ft (793 m)
- Mouth: Guyandotte River
  - location: Man
  - coordinates: 37.7414961°N 81.8776191°W
  - elevation: 725 ft (221 m)
- Length: 18.8 mi (30.3 km)
- Basin size: 45 sq mi (120 km^{2})

Buffalo Creek is a tributary of the Guyandotte River, 18.8 miles (30.3 km) long, in southern West Virginia in the United States. Via the Guyandotte and Ohio rivers, it is part of the watershed of the Mississippi River, draining an area of 45 square miles (120 km^{2}) in the Logan Coalfield. The creek was the site of the Buffalo Creek Flood in 1972.

Buffalo Creek's entire course and drainage area are in eastern Logan County. It rises near the common boundary of Logan, Wyoming, and Boone counties and flows generally west-southwestward through the unincorporated communities of Saunders, Pardee, Lorado, Craneco, Lundale, Stowe, Crites, Latrobe, Robinette, Amherstdale, Becco, Braeholm, Accoville, Crown, and Kistler, to the town of Man, where it flows into the Guyandotte River from the northeast.

According to the West Virginia Department of Environmental Protection, approximately 92% of the Buffalo Creek watershed is forested, mostly deciduous.

== See also ==
- List of rivers of West Virginia
