= Lorado, West Virginia =

- Unincorporated community
- Location within West Virginia Location within the United States
- Coordinates: 37°47′44″N 81°42′53″W
- Country: United States
- State: West Virginia
- County: Logan
- Elevation: 1,240 ft (380 m)
- Time zone: UTC-5 (Eastern (EST))
  - Summer (DST): UTC-4 (EDT)
- ZIP code: 25630
- Area codes: 304 & 681
- GNIS feature ID: 1542456

Lorado is an unincorporated community in Logan County, West Virginia, United States. Lorado is 10 miles (16 km) east-northeast of Man, along Buffalo Creek. Lorado has a post office with ZIP code 25630.

The community's name is an acronym of the Lorain Coal and Dock Company.
