= Fanco, West Virginia =

Unincorporated community in West Virginia, United States

- Unincorporated community
- Location within West Virginia Location within the United States
- Coordinates: 37°46′36″N 81°49′6″W
- Country: United States
- State: West Virginia
- County: Logan
- Elevation: 869 ft (265 m)
- Time zone: UTC-5 (Eastern (EST))
  - Summer (DST): UTC-4 (EDT)
- GNIS ID: 1554442

Fanco is an unincorporated community in Logan County, West Virginia, United States. It is part of the Amherstdale census-designated place.
