= Inchman =

Inchman may refer to:

- Several species of the ant genus Myrmecia
- One of the fictional Races of Bas-Lag
- A song by Jack Stauber
