= Hinchman H-1 Racer =

H-1 Racer

General information
- Type: Single-seat Autogyro
- National origin: United States
- Manufacturer: Hinchman Aircraft Company
- Designer: Hank Hinchman
- Number built: 3 (1998)

History
- First flight: 1987

The Hinchman H-1 Racer is a 1980s American single-seat autogyro designed by Hank Hincham with plans or a kit available from Hincham Aircraft Company for amateur construction.

By 1998 the kit and plans were being offered by Winners Circle Engineering Inc. of Monrovia, Indiana.

== Design and development ==
The aircraft was designed to comply with the US Experimental - Amateur-built aircraft rules. It features a single main rotor, a single-seat enclosed cockpit with a windshield, tricycle landing gear with wheel pants, hydraulic disk brakes and a self-aligning nosewheel, plus a tail caster. The acceptable power range is 47 to 120 hp (35 to 89 kW) and the standard engine used is a twin cylinder, air-cooled, two-stroke, single-ignition 50 hp (37 kW) Rotax 503 engine in pusher configuration. The cabin width is 22 in (56 cm).

The aircraft fuselage structure is made from bolted-together aluminum tubing has a full aerodynamic, bullet-shaped, composite cockpit fairing that adds 12 lb (5.4 kg) to the aircraft's empty weight. Its two-bladed rotor has a diameter of 25.0 ft (7.6 m) and an optional pre-rotator. The aircraft has a typical empty weight of 380 lb (170 kg) and a gross weight of 630 lb (290 kg), giving a useful load of 250 lb (110 kg). With full fuel of 5 U.S. gallons (19 L; 4.2 imp gal) the payload for the pilot and baggage is 220 lb (100 kg).

The standard day, sea level, no wind, take off with a 50 hp (37 kW) engine is 500 ft (152 m) and the landing roll is 10 ft (3 m).

The manufacturer estimated the construction time from the supplied kit as 150 hours.

== Operational history ==
By 1998 the company reported that 100 plans and kits had been sold and three aircraft were completed and flying.

In April 2015 one example was registered in the United States with the Federal Aviation Administration to the designer.

== Specifications ==
Data from Taylor

General characteristics

- Crew: 1
- Length: 10 ft 9 in (3.28 m)
- Height: 7 ft 11 in (2.41 m)
- Empty weight: 300 lb (136 kg)
- Max takeoff weight: 550 lb (249 kg)
- Powerplant: 1 × Rotax 503 , 50 hp (37 kW)
- Main rotor diameter: 25 ft (7.6 m)

Performance

- Maximum speed: 85 mph (137 km/h, 74 kn)
- Cruise speed: 65 mph (105 km/h, 56 kn)
- Range: 65 mi (105 km, 56 nmi)
- Service ceiling: 10,000 ft (3,000 m)
- Rate of climb: 1,200 ft/min (6.1 m/s)

== See also ==
Related lists

- List of autogyro models
