= Buffalo High School (West Virginia) =

Coordinates: 38.60598°N 81.99258°W

- 19005 Charleston Road; Putnam, West Virginia 25033; United States

Information
- Type: Public
- Motto: "Where Tradition Meets Innovation."
- Established: 1920
- School district: Putnam County Schools
- Principal: Joshua Isaacs
- Teaching staff: 23.00 (FTE)
- Grades: 9 to 12
- Enrollment: 376 (2023-2024)
- Student to teacher ratio: 16.35
- Colours: Navy and gold
- Athletics conference: WV Class AA
- Mascot: Bison
- Team name: Buffalo Bison
- Website: https://bhs.putnamschools.com/o/bhs

Buffalo High School is a high school in Buffalo, West Virginia, United States, serving the northern part of Putnam County, including Eleanor. It is a part of Putnam County Schools.

The school colors are navy and gold, and the athletic mascot and nickname are the Bison. Sometimes sports scores refer to the school as "Buffalo-Putnam" or "Buffalo of Putnam" because there used to be another Buffalo High School in Wayne County, but this practice fell into disuse after Buffalo-Wayne High School was consolidated with Vinson High School and Ceredo-Kenova High School to form Spring Valley High School for the 1999 academic year.

The school has approximately 380 students, placing it in Class AA for sports. This is the smallest of the four schools in Putnam County, and for years the county attempted to close the school. However, this was always defeated by voters. A new building was finished in 2012, insuring the continued existence of the school.
