= Man, West Virginia =

- Town
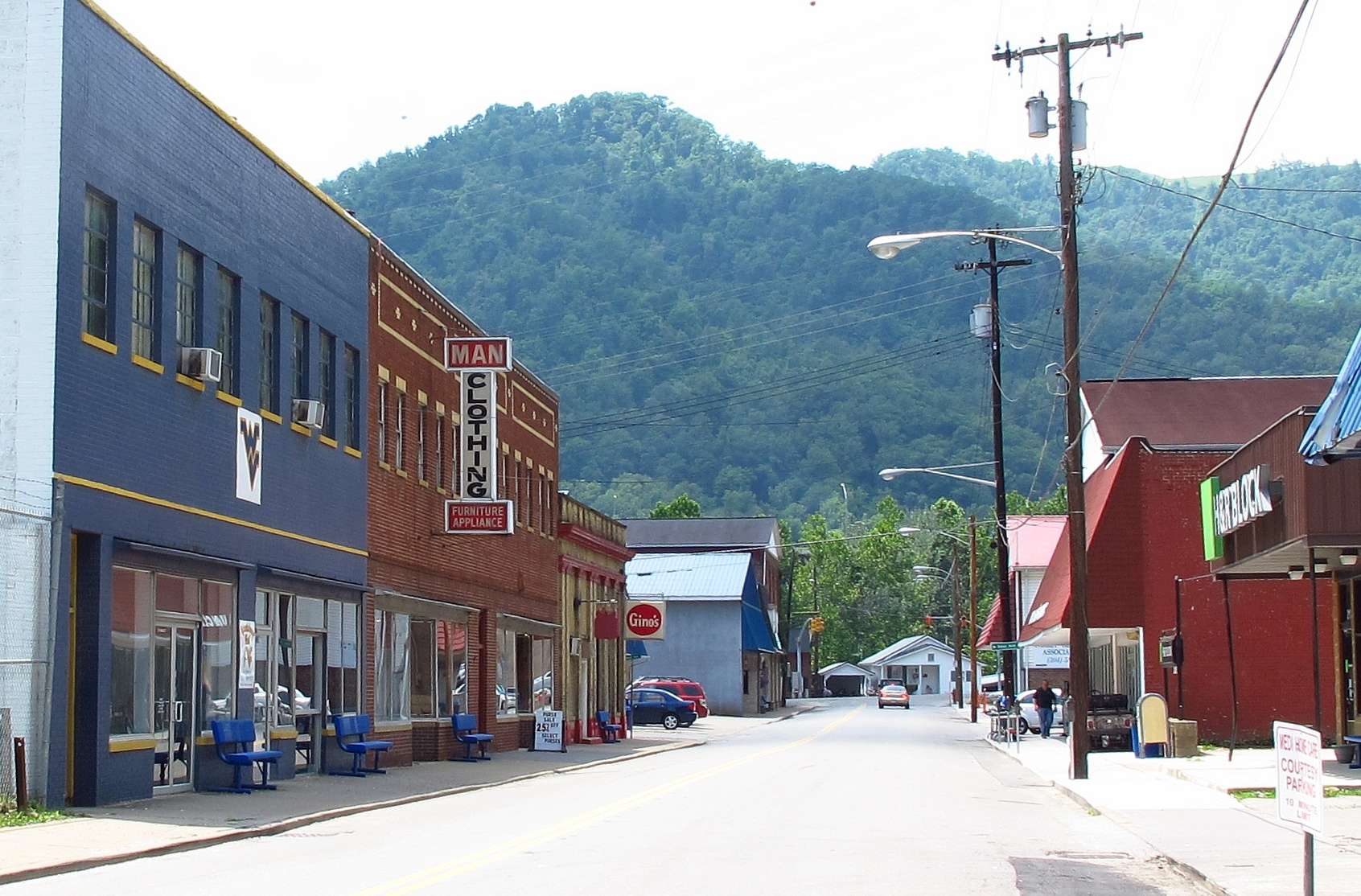
- Main Street in Man

- Location of Man in Logan County, West Virginia.
- Coordinates: 37°44′34″N 81°52′31″W
- Country: United States
- State: West Virginia
- County: Logan

Government
  - Mayor: John Fekete
  - Town Clerk: Misty Morgan

Area
  - Total: 1.15 sq mi (2.98 km^{2})
  - Land: 1.10 sq mi (2.84 km^{2})
  - Water: 0.054 sq mi (0.14 km^{2})
- Elevation: 738 ft (225 m)

Population (2020)
  - Total: 772
  - Estimate (2021): 759
- Time zone: UTC-5 (Eastern (EST))
  - Summer (DST): UTC-4 (EDT)
- ZIP code: 25635
- Area codes: 304 & 681
- FIPS code: 54-50932
- GNIS feature ID: 1542706

Man is a town in Logan County, West Virginia, United States. The population was 772 at the 2020 census. The town is located along the Guyandotte River at the mouth of Buffalo Creek, which was the site of the 1972 Buffalo Creek Flood following a dam collapse. The name of the town reportedly derives from the last syllable of the surname of Ulysses Hinchman, who was a member of the House of Delegates from Logan County between 1866 and 1869.

== Geography ==
According to the United States Census Bureau, the town has a total area of 1.16 square miles (3.00 km^{2}), of which 1.10 square miles (2.85 km^{2}) is land and 0.06 square miles (0.16 km^{2}) is water.

=== Climate ===
The climate in this area is characterized by hot, humid summers and generally mild to cool winters. According to the Köppen Climate Classification system, Man has a humid subtropical climate, abbreviated "Cfa" on climate maps.

== Demographics ==
Historical population
Census	Pop.	Note	%±
1930	835		—
1940	1,342		60.7%
1950	1,632		21.6%
1960	1,486		−8.9%
1970	1,201		−19.2%
1980	1,333		11.0%
1990	914		−31.4%
2000	770		−15.8%
2010	759		−1.4%
2020	772		1.7%
2021 (est.)	759	▼	−1.7%
U.S. Decennial Census

=== 2010 census ===
At the 2010 census there were 759 people, 324 households, and 221 families living in the town. The population density was 690.0 inhabitants per square mile (266.4/km^{2}). There were 362 housing units at an average density of 329.1 per square mile (127.1/km^{2}). The racial makeup of the town was 96.0% White, 1.4% African American, 0.1% Native American, 1.7% Asian, and 0.7% from other races. Hispanic or Latino of any race were 0.7%.

Of the 324 households 28.4% had children under the age of 18 living with them, 51.9% were married couples living together, 12.0% had a female householder with no husband present, 4.3% had a male householder with no wife present, and 31.8% were non-families. 26.9% of households were one person and 10.5% were one person aged 65 or older. The average household size was 2.34 and the average family size was 2.80.

The median age in the town was 44 years. 20.2% of residents were under the age of 18; 7% were between the ages of 18 and 24; 24.8% were from 25 to 44; 31.2% were from 45 to 64; and 16.9% were 65 or older. The gender makeup of the town was 49.4% male and 50.6% female.

=== 2000 census ===
At the 2000 census there were 770 people, 336 households, and 229 families living in the town. The population density was 1,313.1 inhabitants per square mile (503.9/km^{2}). There were 363 housing units at an average density of 619.0 per square mile (237.6/km^{2}). The racial makeup of the town was 94.68% White, 1.95% African American, 3.25% Asian and 0.13% Pacific Islander. Hispanic or Latino of any race were 0.91%.

Of the 336 households 24.1% had children under the age of 18 living with them, 51.5% were married couples living together, 12.8% had a female householder with no husband present, and 31.8% were non-families. 27.4% of households were one person and 14.6% were one person aged 65 or older. The average household size was 2.29 and the average family size was 2.79.

The age distribution was 19.4% under the age of 18, 8.1% from 18 to 24, 24.4% from 25 to 44, 29.9% from 45 to 64, and 18.3% 65 or older. The median age was 44 years. For every 100 females, there were 90.1 males. For every 100 females age 18 and over, there were 85.9 males.

The median household income was $40,179 and the median family income was $45,893. Males had a median income of $37,212 versus $24,583 for females. The per capita income for the town was $21,304. About 18.9% of families and 21.2% of the population were below the poverty line, including 36.3% of those under age 18 and 10.2% of those age 65 or over.

== Notable people ==
- Max Butcher, baseball pitcher of the 1930s and 1940s, died in Man.
- Bus Cook, sports agent for Brett Favre, others.
