= History of Bay Area Rapid Transit =

History of transit system in California, US

Bay Area Rapid Transit, widely known by the acronym BART, is the main rail transportation system for the San Francisco Bay Area. It was envisioned as early as 1946 but the construction of the original system began in the 1960s.

== Origins and planning ==
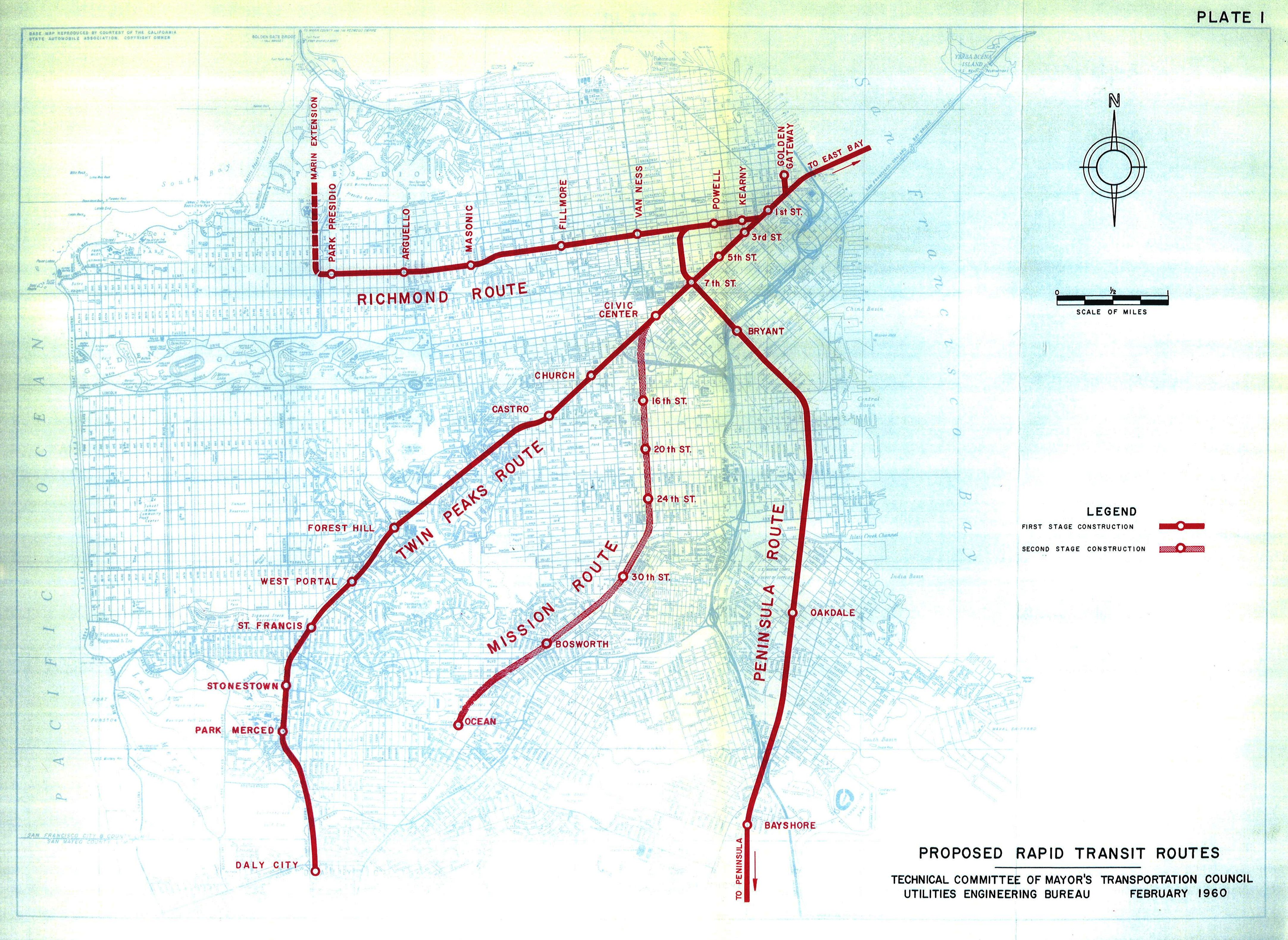
Envisioned master plan for rapid transit in San Francisco. BART was intended to take over existing rail corridors as well as incorporate new routes into the regional system. This map from 1960 included service through the Caltrain right of way as well as the Twin Peaks Tunnel, currently used for Muni Metro service, in addition to a Geary Subway and the constructed route down Mission Street (truncated to Balboa Park in this plan).

The idea of an electric rail tube under San Francisco Bay was first proposed in the early 1900s by Francis "Borax" Smith – the San Francisco Chronicle ran a front-page editorial in 1900 suggesting an electrified subway. There were also plans for a third-rail powered subway line (Twin Peaks Tunnel) under Market Street in the 1910s. A 1915 study prepared for the cities of Oakland and Berkeley called a rapid transit link between the two cities "imperative," suggesting new street railway lines or an elevated railway between the two cities. Much of BART's current coverage area was once served by the electrified streetcar and interurban train network called the Key System. This early twentieth century system once had regular transbay traffic across the lower deck of the San Francisco–Oakland Bay Bridge. The final passenger run occurred on April 20, 1958 and the entire system was soon dismantled in favor of automobiles and buses and the explosive growth of highway construction.

Proposals for the modern rapid transit system now in service began in 1946 by Bay Area business leaders concerned with increased post-war migration and growing congestion in the region. An Army-Navy task force concluded that an additional trans-bay crossing would soon be needed and recommended a tunnel; however, actual planning for a rapid transit system did not begin until the 1950s. In 1951, California's legislature created the San Francisco Bay Area Rapid Transit Commission to study the Bay Area's long-term transportation needs. A New York-based firm, sponsored by the commission, submitted plans for an expansive rapid transit system in 1956. The commission's 1957 final report concluded the most cost-effective solution for the Bay Area's traffic woes would be to form a transit district charged with the construction and operation of a high-speed rapid rail system linking the cities and suburbs. Nine Bay Area counties were included in the initial planning commission.

Logo adopted by the five-county BARTD in 1958

The San Francisco Bay Area Rapid Transit District was formed by the state legislature in 1957, comprising the counties of Alameda, Contra Costa, Marin, San Francisco, and San Mateo. Because Santa Clara County opted instead to first concentrate on its Expressway System, that county was not included in the original BART District. In 1959 a bill was passed in the state legislature that provided for the entire cost of construction of the tube to be paid for with surplus toll revenues from the San Francisco–Oakland Bay Bridge. This represented a significant portion of the total cost of the system.

By 1961 a plan for the new system was sent to the boards of supervisors of each of the five counties. These plans called for three branches in the East Bay and four branches in San Francisco, meeting in a subway under Market Street and a tube under the San Francisco Bay. The East Bay branches would connect Concord in the east, Richmond in the northeast and Fremont in the southeast. On the San Francisco side, the system would branch to the south along the Peninsula to Palo Alto, to the southwest along Mission Street to Balboa Park, to Daly City in the west using the existing Twin Peaks Tunnel, and a new Geary Subway leading to the Golden Gate Bridge connecting San Francisco to Novato in the northwest.

However, on April 12, 1962, San Mateo County opted out of the district, citing high costs for the plan, existing service provided by Southern Pacific commuter trains (today's Caltrain), and concerns over shoppers leaving their county for stores in San Francisco. Marin County left the district soon thereafter in May, being forced out due to engineering objections from Golden Gate Bridge operators and fear that Marin voters would not approve the bonds, which had to win more than 60% approval.

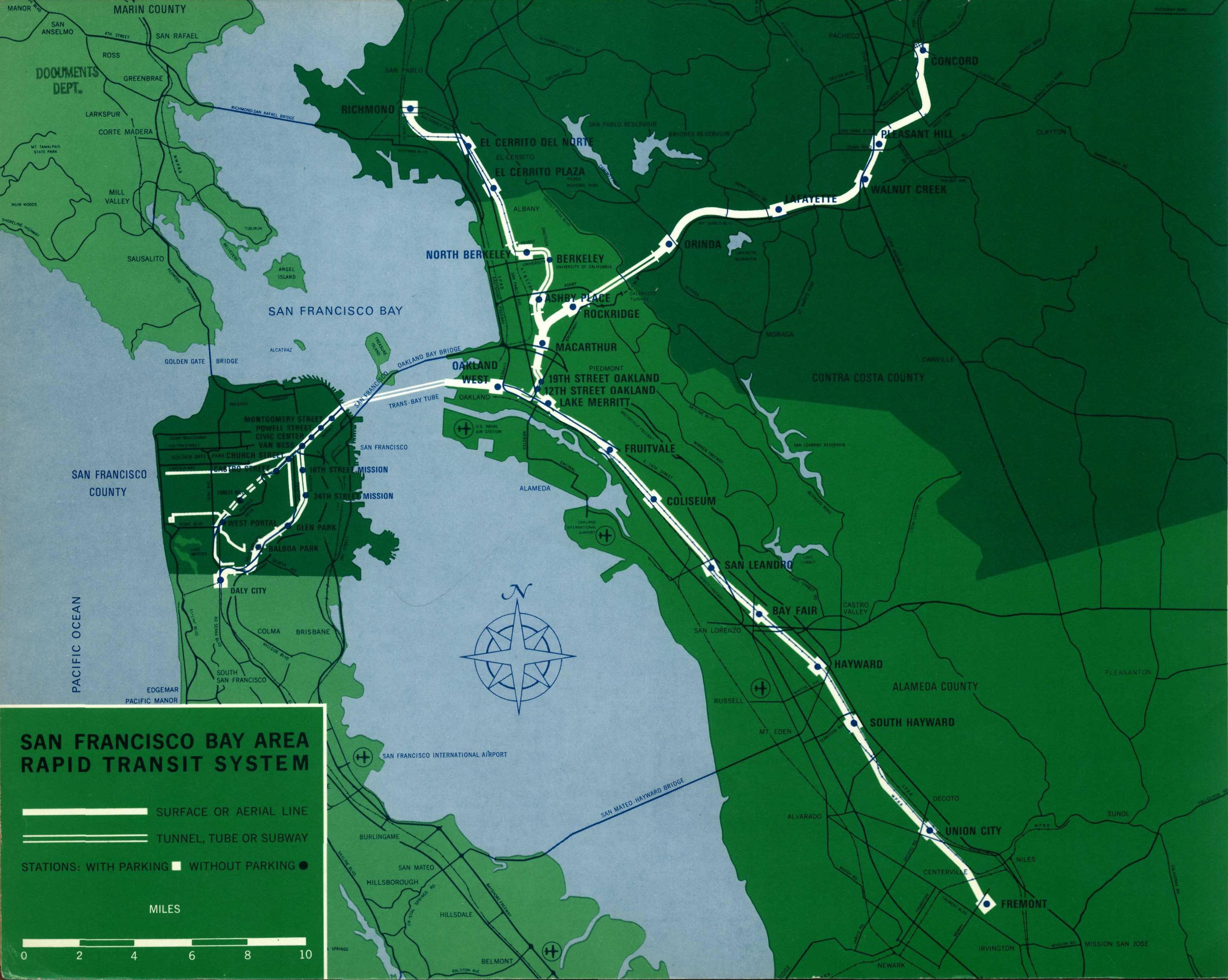
Map of proposed BART lines with existing Muni lines as proposed in the 1962 plan

The withdrawal led to the cancellation of the Peninsula branch and the Geary Subway. The remaining lines in San Francisco were also changed in the 1962 "Composite Report": the Market Street and Mission Street tunnels would be built and operated by BART and would be extended to Daly City, while the San Francisco Municipal Railway would operate the Twin Peaks route with streetcars remaining in the existing tunnel, and being fed into an upper level of the Market Street subway. The plan was approved by the voters of the three remaining participating counties in July 1962.

Berkeley initially approved a combination of underground and elevated lines on their portion of the system, as outlined in the 1961 and 1962 plans. Downtown Berkeley station would be located underground, while both Ashby and North Berkeley were to be constructed on elevated segments. Residents eventually came to oppose this scheme in favor of one where the line would be run in a tunnel for its length. After several hearings, the city voted to tax themselves for the funds necessary to fully underground the line, to the amount of $20 million ($154 million adjusted for inflation). BART estimates that the issue added $18 million ($139 million adjusted for inflation) to construction costs and delayed completion of the system.

=== New rail technologies ===
As one of the first entirely new rapid transit systems built from scratch in the 20th century, the architects of what would become BART intended to take advantage of space age and jet age technologies to design a rail system that could be marketed to other cities and regions. This led to several unconventional design choices for the system.

The cars were to be made from aluminum, which would make them extremely lightweight, about 800 pounds (360 kg) per foot. To keep the lightweight cars stable while exposed to high wind conditions on superelevated curves, the joint venture of Parsons Brinckerhoff-Tudor-Bechtel, general engineering consultants to the District, recommended a broad gauge. The consultants report in 1964 recommended a gauge of 5 ft 6 in (1,676 mm), unusual in the United States, which they said would improve stability and comfort without an exponential increase in construction costs.

Also, tracks were designed to utilize flat-edge rails and wheels. The railway utilizes an electrical system powered at an unusual 1,000 volts of direct current using third rail. Historically, streetcars operated at 600 V DC overhead lines and older subway systems tended to adopt this voltage using third rail, while new systems contemporary to BART and since usually use 750 V power from third rail or 1500 V power from overhead lines. Standards BS EN 50163 and IEC 60850 only specify these as well as 1,500 V power.

The combination of unique loading gauges and unusual rail technologies has complicated maintenance and increased cost of the system, as rolling stock requires custom wheelsets, brake systems, and power systems.

== The initial system (1964–76) ==
=== Construction ===
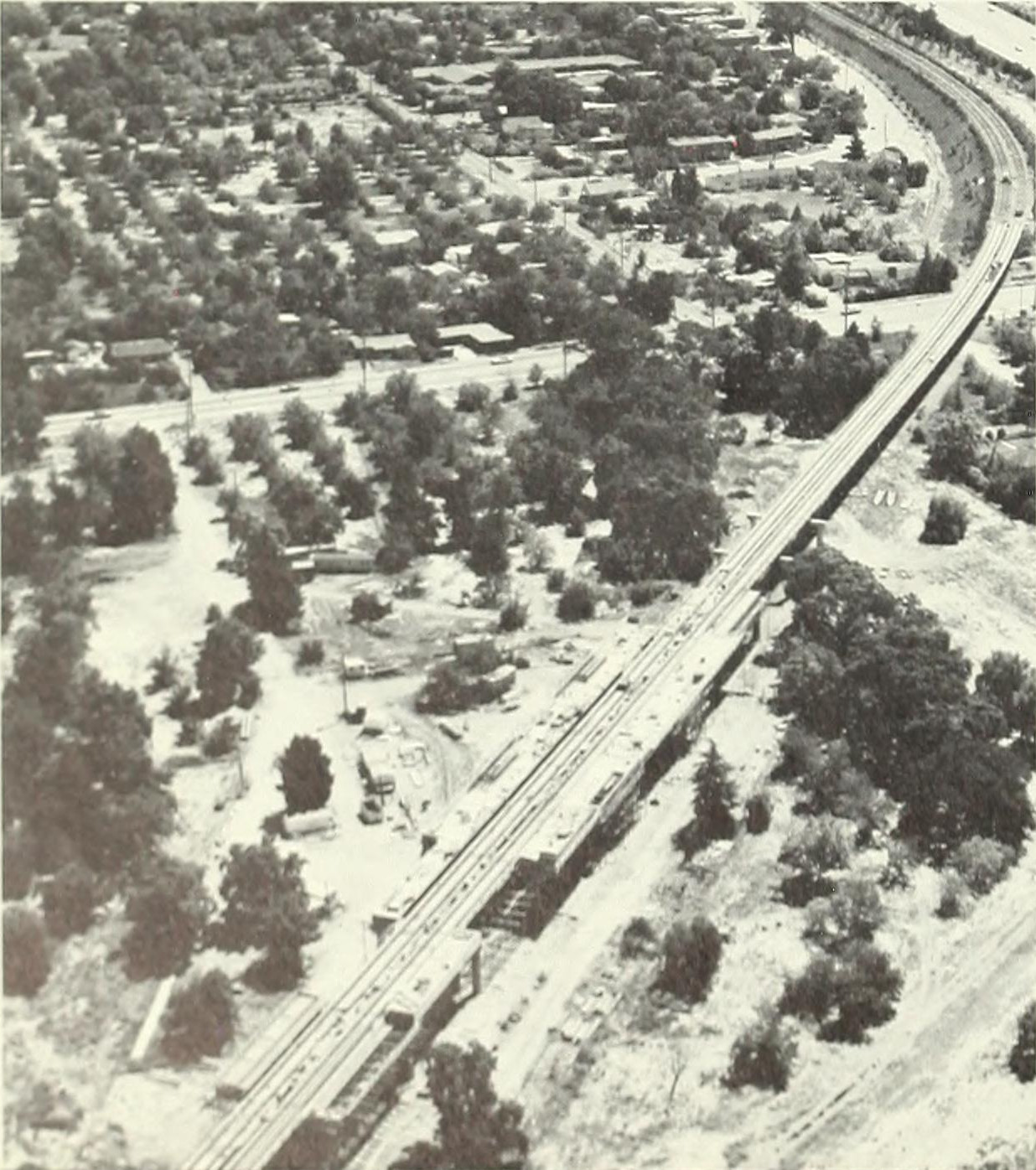
Pleasant Hill station under construction in 1970

BART construction officially began on June 19, 1964, with President Lyndon Johnson presiding over the ground-breaking ceremonies at the 4.4-mile (7.1 km) Diablo Test Track between Concord and Walnut Creek in Contra Costa County, where Parsons Brinckerhoff-Tudor-Bechtel would test out the system's new technologies and unconventional design choices.

The system was scheduled to be completed in 1971.

Meanwhile construction would also begin on some of the other major projects on the system. The enormous tasks to be undertaken were daunting, including the Transbay Tube, the two-level Market Street subway in San Francisco, the complex underground Oakland Wye junction, the Berkeley Hills Tunnel, more than a dozen underground stations in Berkeley, Oakland and San Francisco, along with new maintenance facilities throughout the system.

The centerpiece of the system, the 3.6-mile (5.8 km)-long Transbay Tube, connected Oakland and San Francisco beneath the San Francisco Bay. Restoring transbay passenger rail service for the first time since Key System service was discontinued across the Bay Bridge, the tube was the world's longest and deepest immersed tunnel when it was completed in August 1969 at a cost of $180 million ($1.58 billion adjusted for inflation). It was constructed in 57 sections, each positioned and installed individually by sinking them into a dredged trough across the bay (that was later filled in).

The 3.2-mile (5.1 km)-long Berkeley Hills Tunnel was constructed through active faults between Berkeley and Orinda in order to avoid further use of the Caldecott Tunnel.

BART constructed right-of-ways utilizing several rail and freeway corridors. For the initial system, these included: the Sacramento Northern Railway right-of-way in Concord, Contra Costa Center and Walnut Creek; State Route 24 and Interstate 980 from the Berkeley Hills Tunnel to Oakland; Western Pacific Railroad from Fruitvale to Niles Canyon; Atchison, Topeka and Santa Fe Railway and Key System right-of-ways between Richmond and Berkeley (which also became the Ohlone Greenway and Richmond Greenway); and the San Francisco and San Mateo Electric Railway and original Southern Pacific Ocean View Branch right-of-ways to Daly City.

The final ceremonial spike for the original system was placed in 1971.

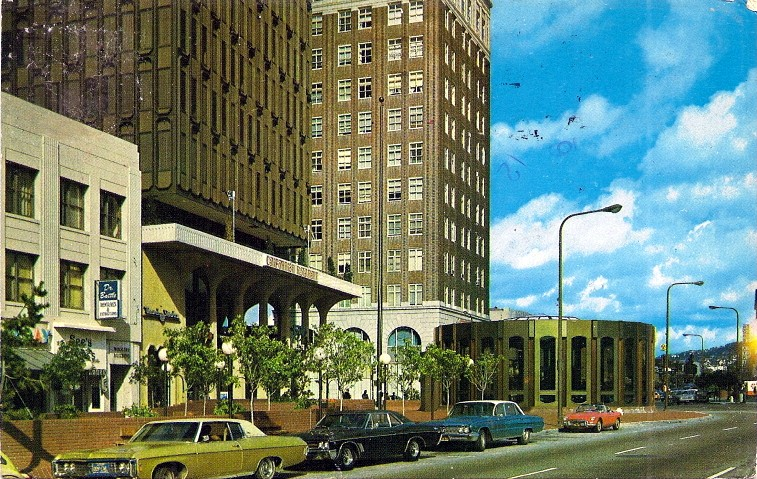
Entrance to the Berkeley station (bottom right) as seen in 1973, shortly after the station opened

=== Opening ===
Service began on September 11, 1972, reporting more than 100,000 passengers in its first five days. The Market Street subway opened on November 3, 1973 and the Transbay Tube finally opened on September 16, 1974, linking the four branches to Daly City, Concord, Richmond, and Fremont. Service then was still 14 hours per day, and for five years BART operated weekday-only: Saturday trains began November 1977 and Sunday in July 1978. Until November 1975, fare was $1.20 ($7.83 adjusted for inflation) from Concord or $1.25 ($8.16 in 2025 adjusted for inflation) from Fremont to any station west of the bay; Richmond to Fremont was $1.10 ($7.18 in 2025 adjusted for inflation).

BART diverted 44,000 trips made by private cars by 1976, well short of the anticipated 157,000. One possible cause of this was that riders had difficulty reaching stations, especially on foot, which was not properly accounted for in ridership models.

BART's cost in 1976 was pegged at $1.586 billion, which included both the initial system, rolling stock and the Transbay Tube. (Adjusted for inflation, equivalent to $12.2 billion in 2025.) Critics have said BART took four decades to develop at a high cost.

The original construction included space for a third track through downtown Oakland, but that track remained unopened until March 1986.

=== Infill Station ===
Service at Embarcadero began on May 27, 1976, three years after the other San Francisco stations. The station was not part of the original plans. Due to increasing development in the lower Market Street area, the basic structure of the station was added into the construction of the Market Street subway, anticipating a later opening.

=== Automation ===
BART was one of the first U.S. systems of any size to have substantial automated operations. As a first-generation installation, the automation system was plagued with operational problems during its first years. Shortly after revenue service began, a failure in the train control system caused a two-car train to run off the end of the elevated track at the Fremont station and into a parking lot. There were no serious injuries.

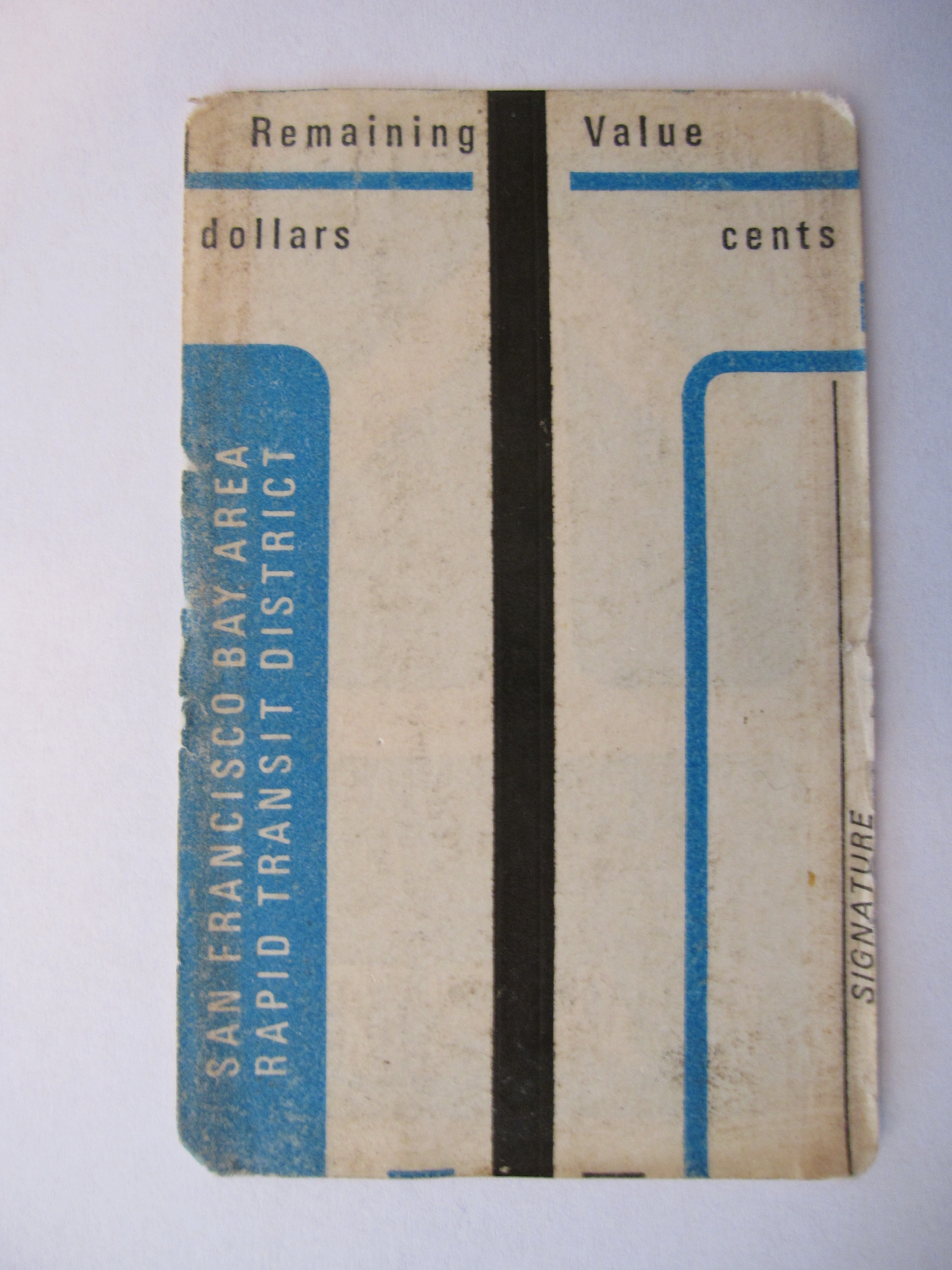
Back of an early magnetic striped encoded paper ticket

The original signaling technology and subsequent enhancements used to control the trains was developed by Westinghouse. When revenue service began, "ghost trains" (or false occupancies), trains that show up on the computer system as being in a specific place but don't physically exist, were common, and real trains could at times disappear from the system. This was the result of dew on the tracks and too low of a voltage (at 0.6 volts rather than the industry standard 15 volts) being passed through the rails for train detection. Under such circumstances, trains had to be operated manually and were restricted to a speed of 25 mph (40 km/h). Enhancements were made to the train control system to address these "ghost trains" (or false occupancies). However, manual blocking — operators in a booth on the platform at alternate stations, with a telephone and red/green lights — that kept trains in stations until the train ahead had left its station were mandated for several years. This caused a great outcry in the press and led to a flurry of litigation between Westinghouse, the original controls contractor, and BART, as well as public battles between the state government (advised by University of California professor Dr. Bill Wattenburg), the federal government, and the district, but in time these problems were resolved and BART became a reliable service. Ghost trains persisted on the system as late as 2007, and while usually cleared quickly enough to avoid significant delay, they can occasionally cause an extended backup of manually operated trains in the system. In addition, the fare card system was easily hackable with equipment commonly found in universities, although most of these flaws have been fixed.

Running logistics were originally handled from a central control room, but that was replaced by the more modern Operations Control Center (OCC) and headquarters at the Kaiser Center in Downtown Oakland.

=== Train-control failures ===
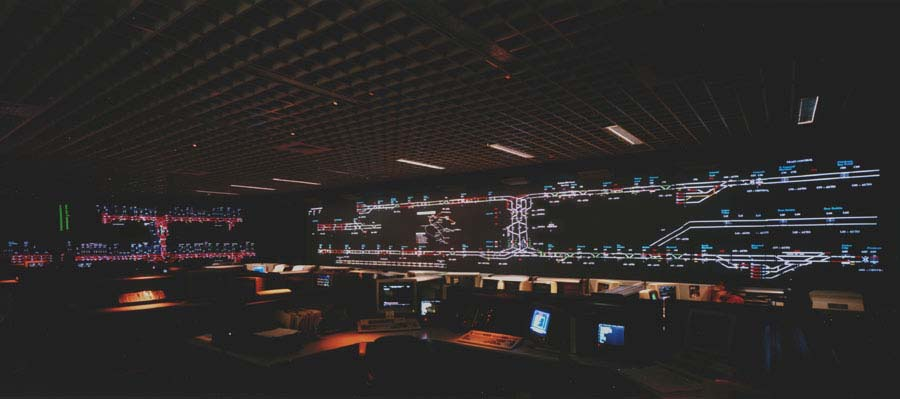
The BART Operations Control Center

Before the system began revenue service, serious problems in the design and operation of the Automatic Train Control (ATC) system were observed. Three engineers working for BART, Max Blankenzee, Robert Bruder, and Holger Hjortsvang, identified safety problems with the ATC in 1969–1971. BART management was dismissive of their concerns, so the three took the issue to the board of directors. All but two of the directors voted in February 1972 to support management and reject the safety concerns. Management retaliated against the engineers, firing them in March 1972. The IEEE later filed the first amicus curiae brief in its history to support the engineers.

The California Society of Professional Engineers reported to the California State Senate in June 1972 that there were serious safety risks with the ATC. Legislative analyst A. Alan Post opened an investigation immediately, and brought in electrical engineering Professor Bill Wattenburg of the University of California, Berkeley as a consultant.

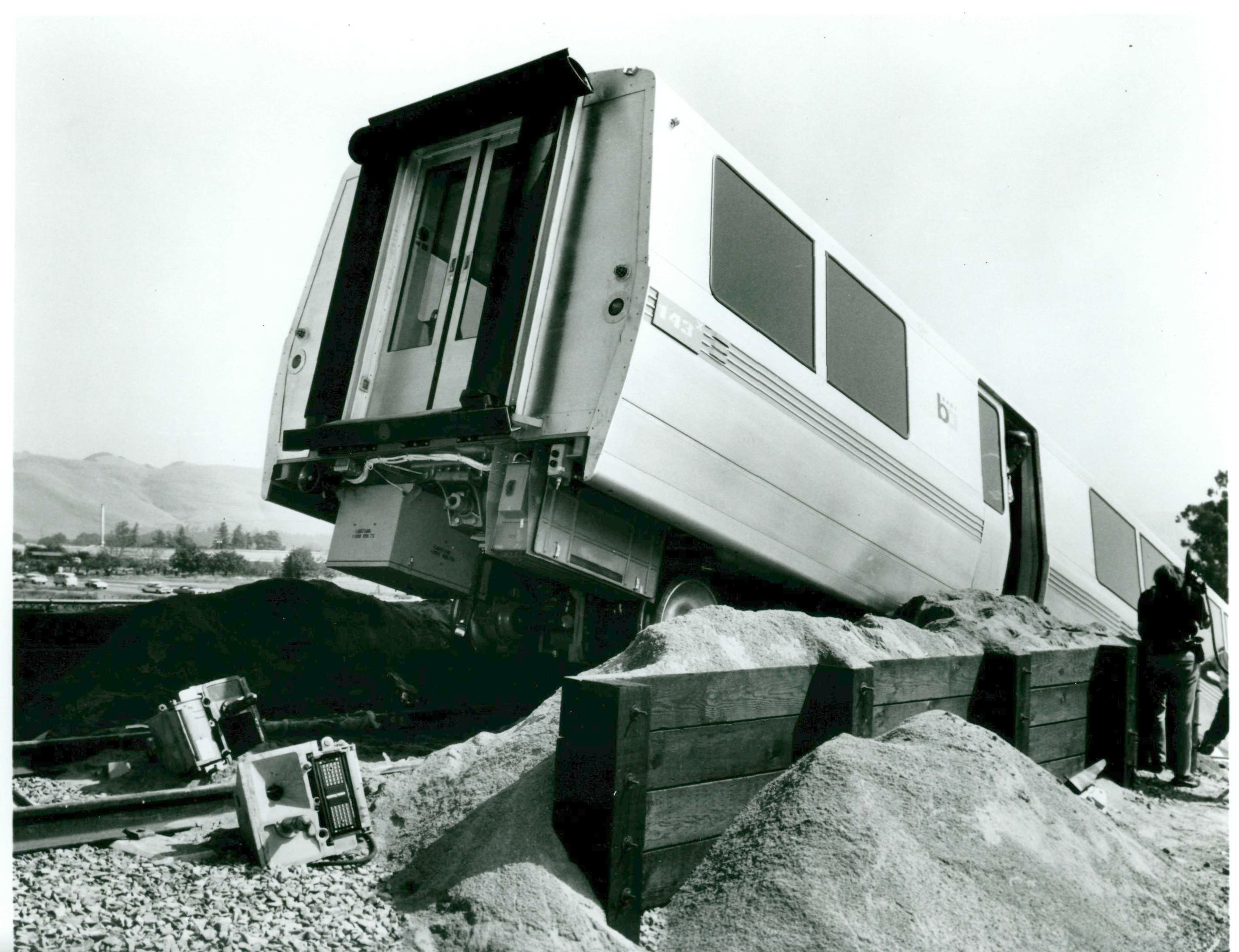
The Fremont station accident, 1972

An ATC failure caused the train to run off the end of the elevated track and crash to the ground, injuring four people on board, and drawing national and international attention. This accident led to a comprehensive redesign of the train controls. The California State Public Utilities Commission imposed stringent oversight over train operations, and stationed State inspectors inside BART central control.

The legislative analyst issued the first of three "Post Reports" in November 1972. The report was "sharply critical" of BART, finding that the ATC system was unreliable, the ATC program was mismanaged, and "no solution was in sight." The report accused BART of paying excessive fees for engineering services. BART's general manager called the indictment of safety in the Post Report "not only disappointing, but deplorable as well." At the same time, management deemed that the ATC "could not now be trusted to detect one train stalled on the tracks in the path of another going at full speed," so automatic controls were dropped. Telephone calls were placed manually between stations, instead.

The California State Senate, California Public Utilities Commission, and National Transportation Safety Board launched separate investigations. Several managers were replaced, and the general manager came under fire. The legislative analyst reported in March 1974 that BART "suffered from a lack of direction and control on the part of the board and management." The state legislature held hearings lasting one month in 1974 into the financial mismanagement at BART. Following the hearings, legislative analyst A. Alan Post recommended that the general manager be fired. Legislators also threatened to withhold funding from BART unless the general manager quit, and forced the general manager to resign in May 1974.

State legislators moved to completely replace the appointed board of directors, and passed legislation that led to the election of a new board in 1974. The train-control problems and management turmoil delayed the start of service to San Francisco, from 1973 to 1974.

In 1978, engineers Blankenzee, Bruder and Hjortsvang received an ethics award from the IEEE. The "BART Case" is a case study in whistleblowing, used for courses on engineering ethics.

== Loma Prieta earthquake ==
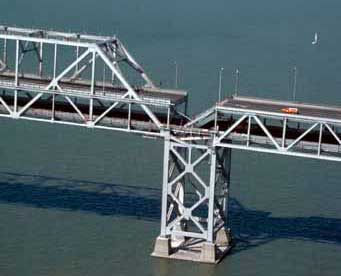
BART provided a vital link between San Francisco and the East Bay while the Bay Bridge underwent repairs for a month after the earthquake.

The 1989 Loma Prieta earthquake severed the San Francisco–Oakland Bay Bridge for a month and destroyed the Cypress Street Viaduct in Oakland. With some Bay Area freeways damaged or destroyed, BART trains, within five hours of the earthquake, were again running; full service resumed at 5 am the next day. Even with service interruptions following aftershocks for inspection of tracks, over- and under-crossings, and tunnels, BART continued to run on a 24-hour timetable until December 3 of that year.

== San Francisco International Airport extension (1984–2003) ==
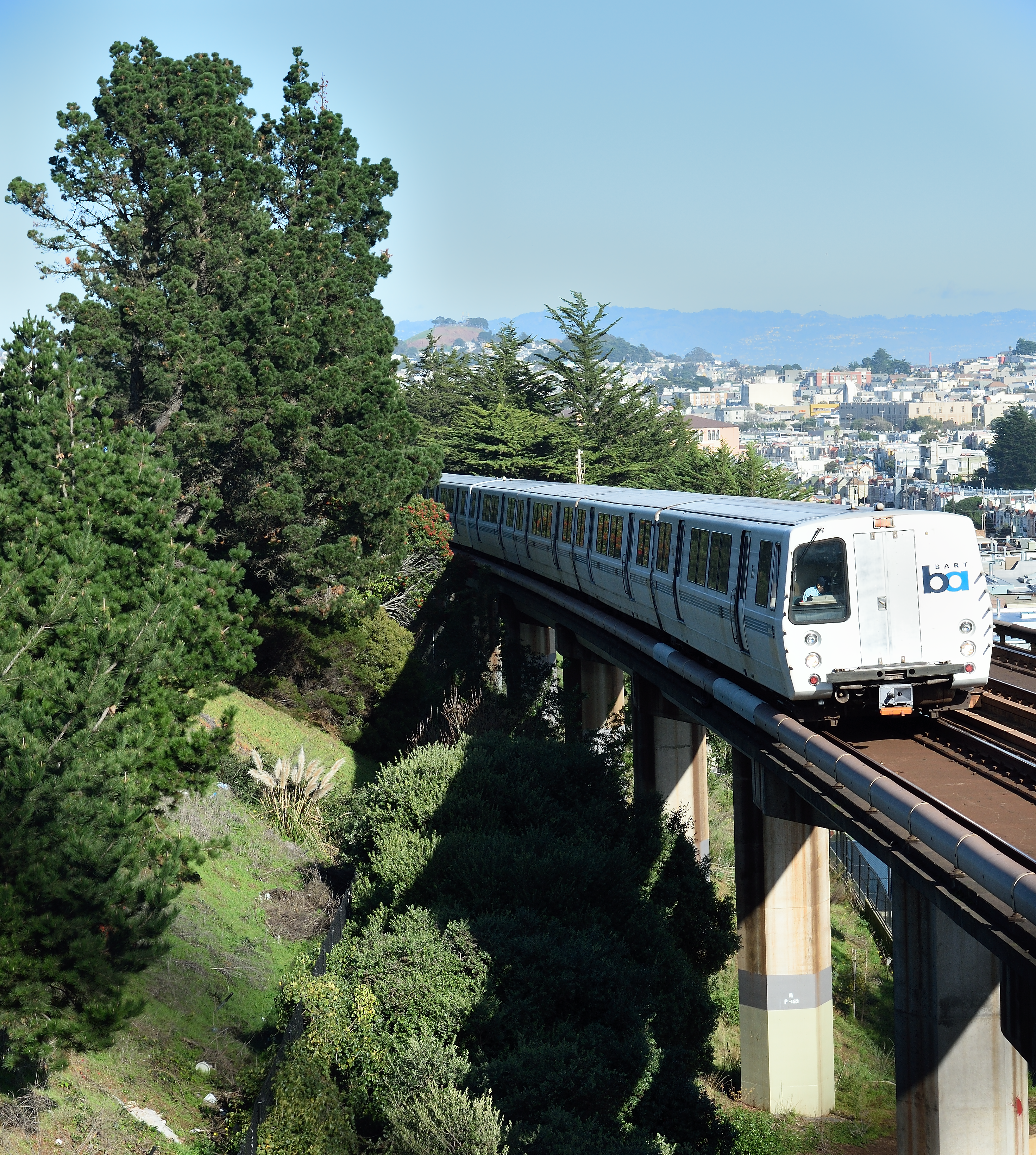
Southbound train between Balboa Park and Daly City

Service south of Daly City was outlined in the 1961 proposal, but the exit of San Mateo County from the planning district caused these plans to be shelved.

Efforts were started as early as 1984 for extension south from San Francisco, the first step being the Daly City Tailtrack Project, upon which turnaround project the San Francisco Airport Extension would later build. Expansion of the system was finally made possible by an agreement under which San Mateo County was to contribute $200 million ($423 million adjusted for inflation) to East Bay extensions as a "buy-in" to the system without actually joining the BART district.

Service into San Mateo County (outside of Daly City) commenced in 1996 with the opening of Colma station. At that time, funding had not been secured for the full airport extension. This station served as the end of the line for over seven years.

Ground was broken on the project in November 1997. Four new stations were added to the system: the SFO station, South San Francisco, San Bruno, and Millbrae. The Millbrae station has a cross-platform connection to Caltrain, the first of its kind west of the Mississippi. The $1.5 billion ($2.63 billion adjusted for inflation) extension of BART southward to San Francisco International Airport's (SFO) Garage G, adjacent to the International Terminal, was opened to the public on June 22, 2003. The right of way had been served by Muni's 40 San Mateo interurban (previously the San Francisco and San Mateo Electric Railway) streetcar line until 1949. The airport extension between SFO and Millbrae station was initially hosted a shuttle service which operated with two train operators—one on each end of the train—between the San Bruno and Millbrae stations to reduce dwell time at SFO during peak hours. The train entered the SFO stub-end station under the control of the primary operator and exited in the opposite direction towards Millbrae controlled by the secondary. Since SFO is now the terminus of the line that serves it, this practice was discontinued as it would not reduce the in-transit time for any trips.

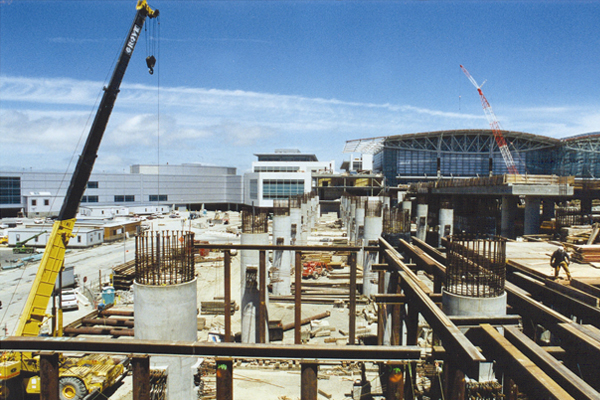
Pillars under construction for the elevated line into SFO, June 1999

The airport extension project added 8.7 miles (14.0 km) of new railway; 6.1 miles (9.8 km) of subway, 1.2 miles (1.9 km) of aerial, and 1.4 miles (2.3 km) of at-grade track. The launch point was the Daly City Tailtrack project, which extended the tracks further south of the existing terminus in San Francisco and was completed in the 1980s.

The project has not been without problems, however. The SFO extension drew 35,107 daily riders by 2008, significantly less than its opening target of 50,000 average weekday riders. The most use the new line has gotten on any single day was 37,200; the SFO Station received an average of 6,781 daily passenger exits in 2015. Another significant problem of note had been the rocky relationship between BART and San Mateo County Transit District (SamTrans) which was not a part of the BART district, but by agreement was responsible for the extension's operating costs. Fueled by the reality that the extension was not paying for itself, the acrimony between BART and SamTrans over changes and reductions in bus and train service reached a high.

BART wanted to increase service to attract ridership, while SamTrans wanted to reduce service to trim costs. Thus, service along the extension was changed several times. Eventually SamTrans and BART worked out a deal in which SamTrans paid BART $32 million, plus approximately $2 million a year, and BART assumed all costs and control of operating the extension.

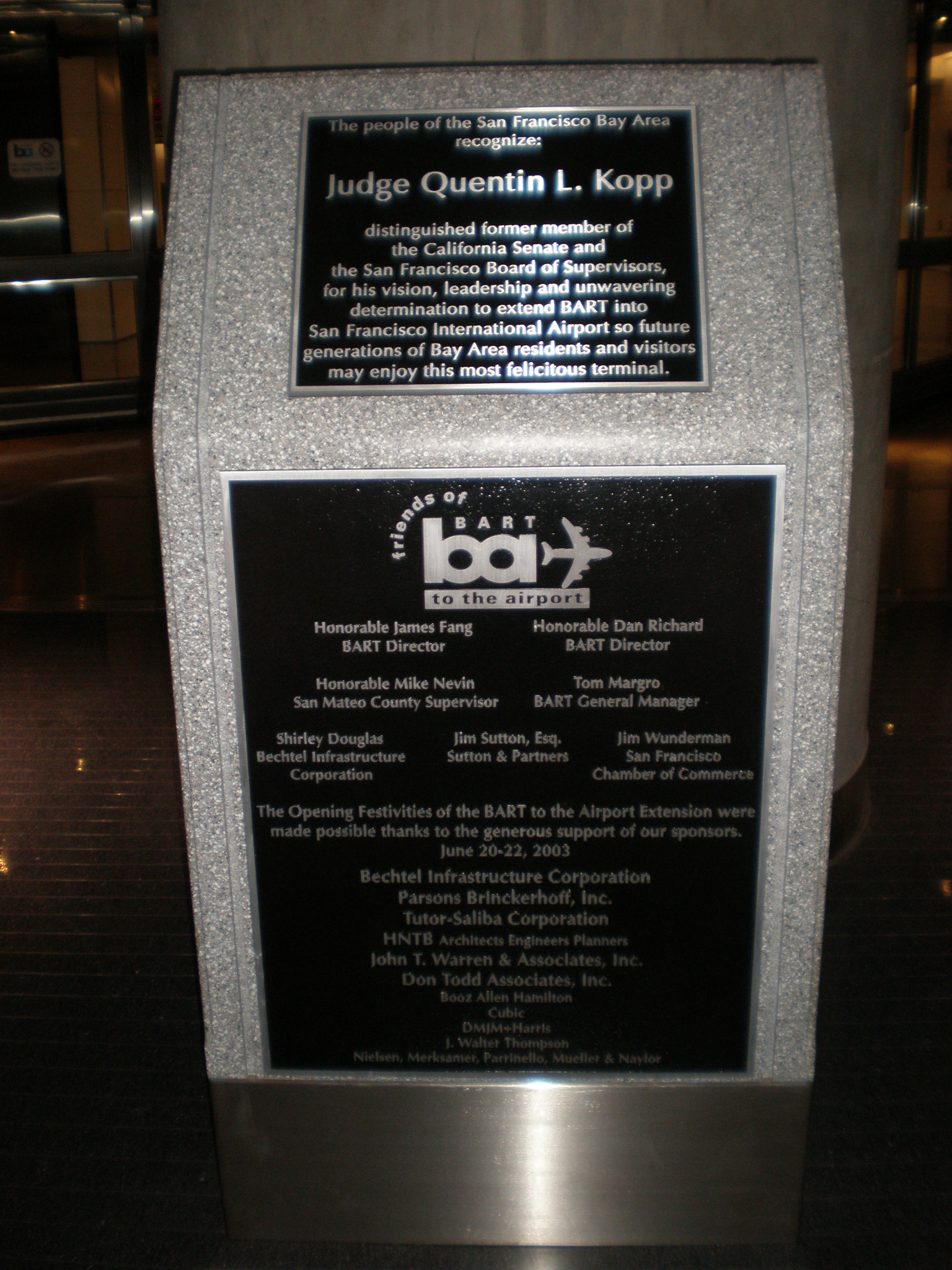
Dedication plaque at SFO station

The disappointing passenger numbers and the fight with SamTrans meant that between 2003 and 2010, BART repeatedly changed its routing patterns on the line south of Daly City, offering at least five distinct service patterns on different lines (Richmond, Pittsburg/Bay Point, Dublin/Pleasanton), with trips terminating at either Millbrae or SFO. The January 1, 2008 change eliminated most direct service between SFO and Millbrae on weekdays, except for a few morning and evening trips. Finally, in 2010 BART settled on a routing pattern that has Pittsburg/Bay Point trains running to SFO at all times. During peak times Mondays through Fridays, Richmond trains run directly to Millbrae without stopping at SFO. During off-peak hours (nights and weekends), Pittsburg/Bay Point trains served both SFO and Millbrae sequentially. Passengers on the Fremont, Richmond, and Dublin/Pleasanton lines had to transfer to the Pittsburg/Bay Point line to reach the airport. In addition, the cessation of direct BART service between Millbrae and SFO during weekday peak hours required Caltrain passengers wanting to travel to the airport from Millbrae had to travel to San Bruno Station and make a transfer to an SFO train. This was mitigated on February 11, 2019, with the reintroduction of the SFO-Millbrae shuttle train, providing a one-seat connection from the airport to Millbrae on weekdays and Sundays, with the Antioch-SFO line providing the connection on weeknights and Saturdays.

== Spur lines (1995–2018) ==
Part of San Mateo's buy in was used to offset funding for extensions of the core system in the East Bay. Trains to North Concord/Martinez began on December 16, 1995, and to Pittsburg/Bay Point on December 7, 1996. On May 10, 1997, a new branch to Castro Valley and Dublin/Pleasanton opened via a right of way constructed in the median of Interstate 580. The Dublin/Pleasanton extension now has transbay trains, but it was planned to have just shuttle trains between Dublin/Pleasanton and Bay Fair. (Long-term plans involve running short trains to a coupling point at Bay Fair to increase system-wide capacity while still providing a one-seat ride.) This line has at various times extended further south from Daly City, and was most recently truncated in 2009.

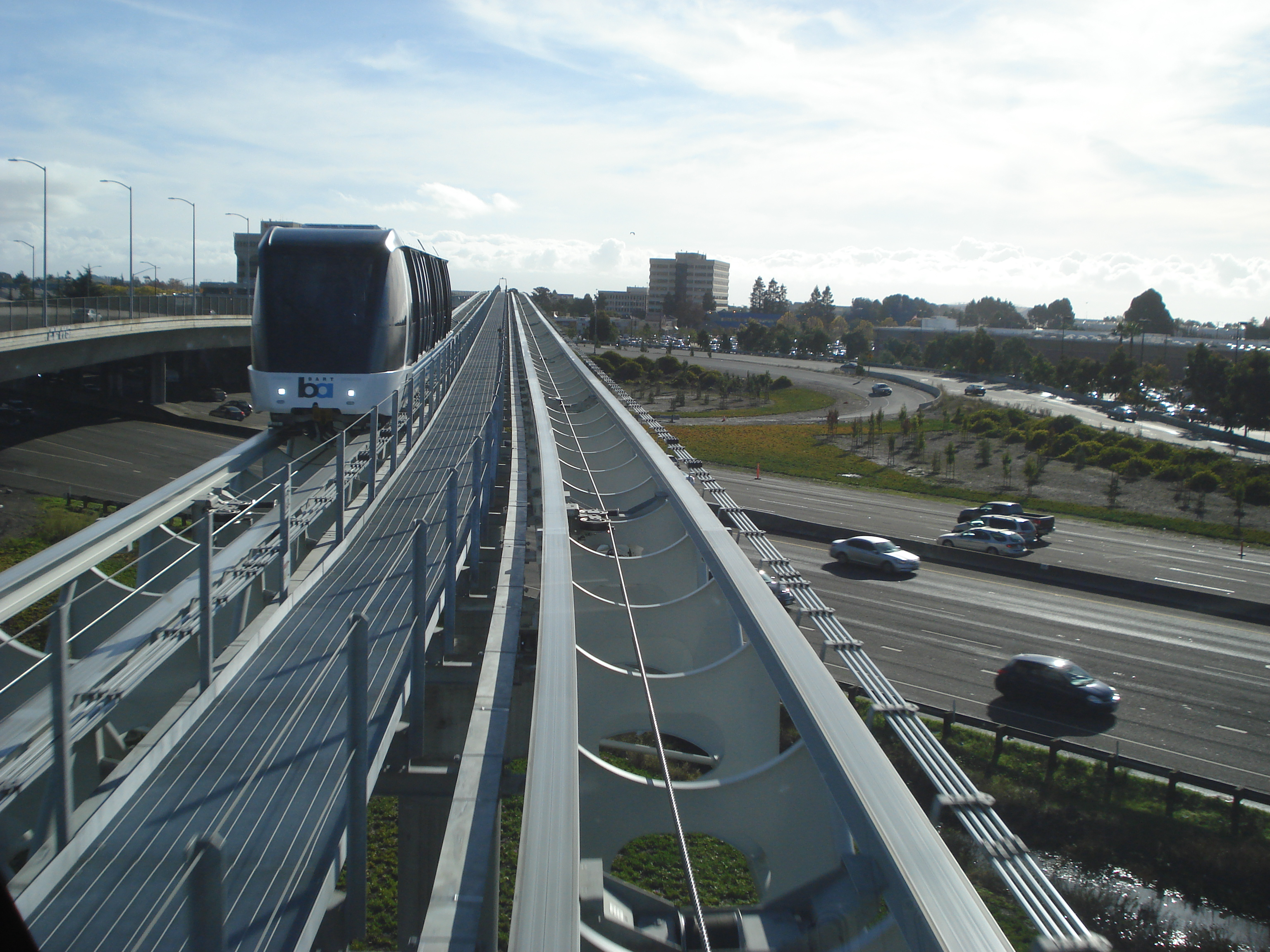
The Oakland Airport Connector crossing over Interstate 880

To save on construction cost compared to a "traditional" third-rail BART buildout, two spur lines were constructed using different technologies; they are neither heavy rail nor electrified. The Oakland Airport Connector was built as a replacement for the bus-serviced AirBART and brought the airport into the system's fare zone. The Coliseum–Oakland International Airport line, as it came to be known, utilizes automated guideway transit (AGT) technology: cable-drawn cars that operate in discrete cable loops on guided rubber tires. The AGT's connection to the existing BART system at Coliseum Station resembles the AirTrain JFK and AirTrain Newark airport people movers' existing off-airport connections to other rail transit lines, though it is run by the transit authority itself rather than an out-of-system operator. Service along the line began on November 22, 2014.

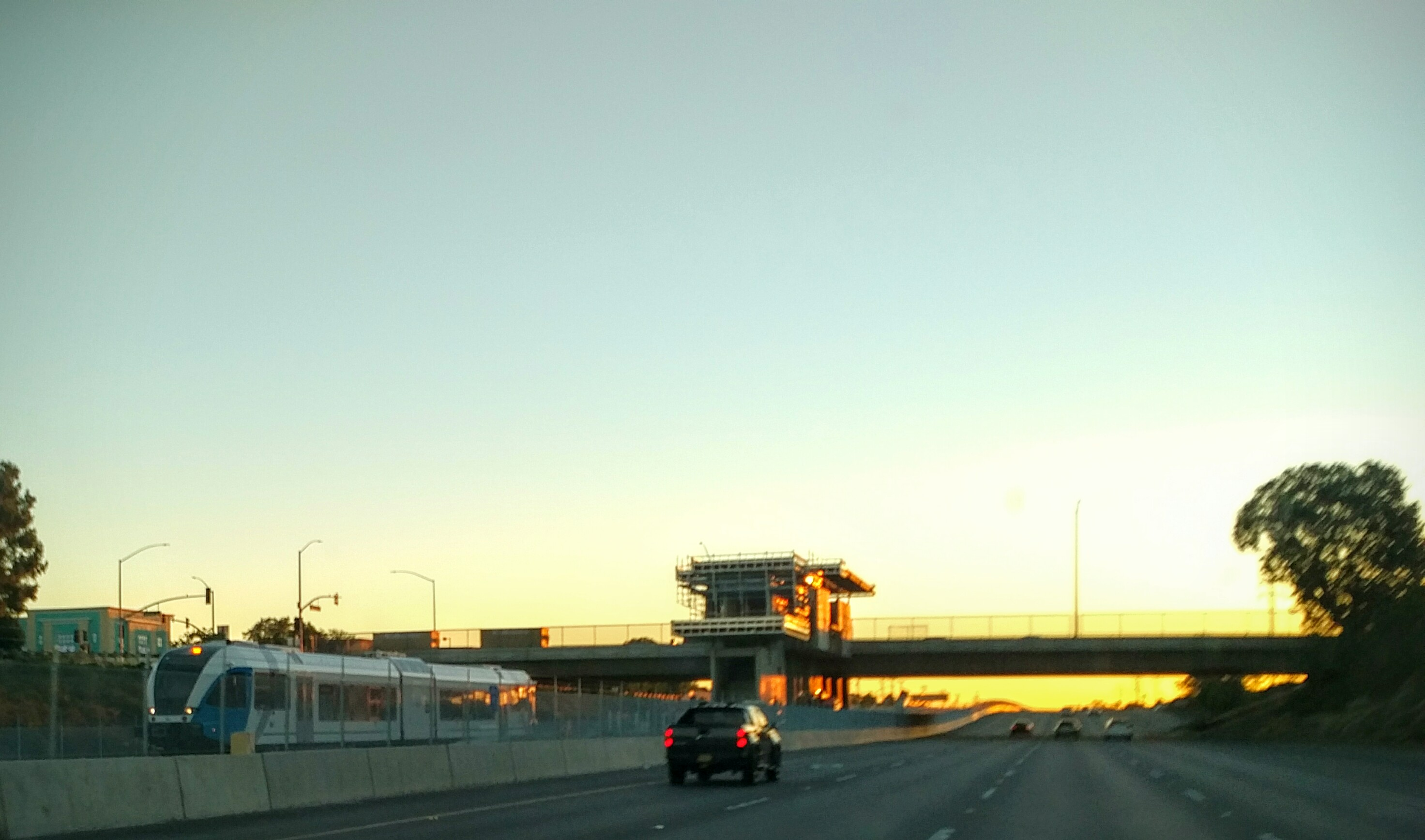
An eBART DMU being tested, departing the Pittsburg Center station, still under construction

eBART was conceived to bring service to the eastern communities in Contra Costa County. Initially studied for full BART service buildout, it was decided to construct the line with standard gauge rail and utilizing diesel multiple unit light rail trains. This allowed BART to roll out service at 60% the cost of traditional buildout with the option to regauge and electrify the route at a later date. The service debuted on May 26, 2018, and included a stop at Pittsburg Center station, which was primarily funded with money from the city of Pittsburg. It is referred to by BART as simply an extension of the existing Pittsburg-Bay Point line to Antioch rather than a separate route.

=== Infill station ===
Because West Dublin / Pleasanton station was originally planned to enter into service as part of the original extension to Dublin/Pleasanton, the station's foundation along with some communication and train control facilities already existed on-site. Final construction of the station for revenue service began on October 29, 2006. Possible faulty construction delayed its opening until 2011. Its cost was estimated at $106 million ($152 million adjusted for inflation), with funding coming from a unique public-private partnership and the proceeds of planned transit-oriented development (TOD) on adjacent BART-owned property.

Proposals to extend the line further east to Livermore have been put forward variously since its construction to Dublin/Pleasanton. In 2017, citing lack of interest in the project from BART, the Livermore City Council proposed a newly established local entity to undertake planning and construction of the extension, which was also recommended by the California State Assembly Transportation Committee. The Tri-Valley–San Joaquin Valley Regional Rail Authority was established that year "for purposes of planning, developing, and delivering cost-effective and responsive transit connectivity between the Bay Area Rapid Transit District's rapid transit system and the Altamont Corridor Express commuter rail service in the Tri-Valley, that meets the goals and objectives of the community." Funds previously allocated to BART to construct a Livermore extension were forfeited to the authority by July 1, 2018. This system is called the Valley Link.

== Silicon Valley extension (2009–present) ==
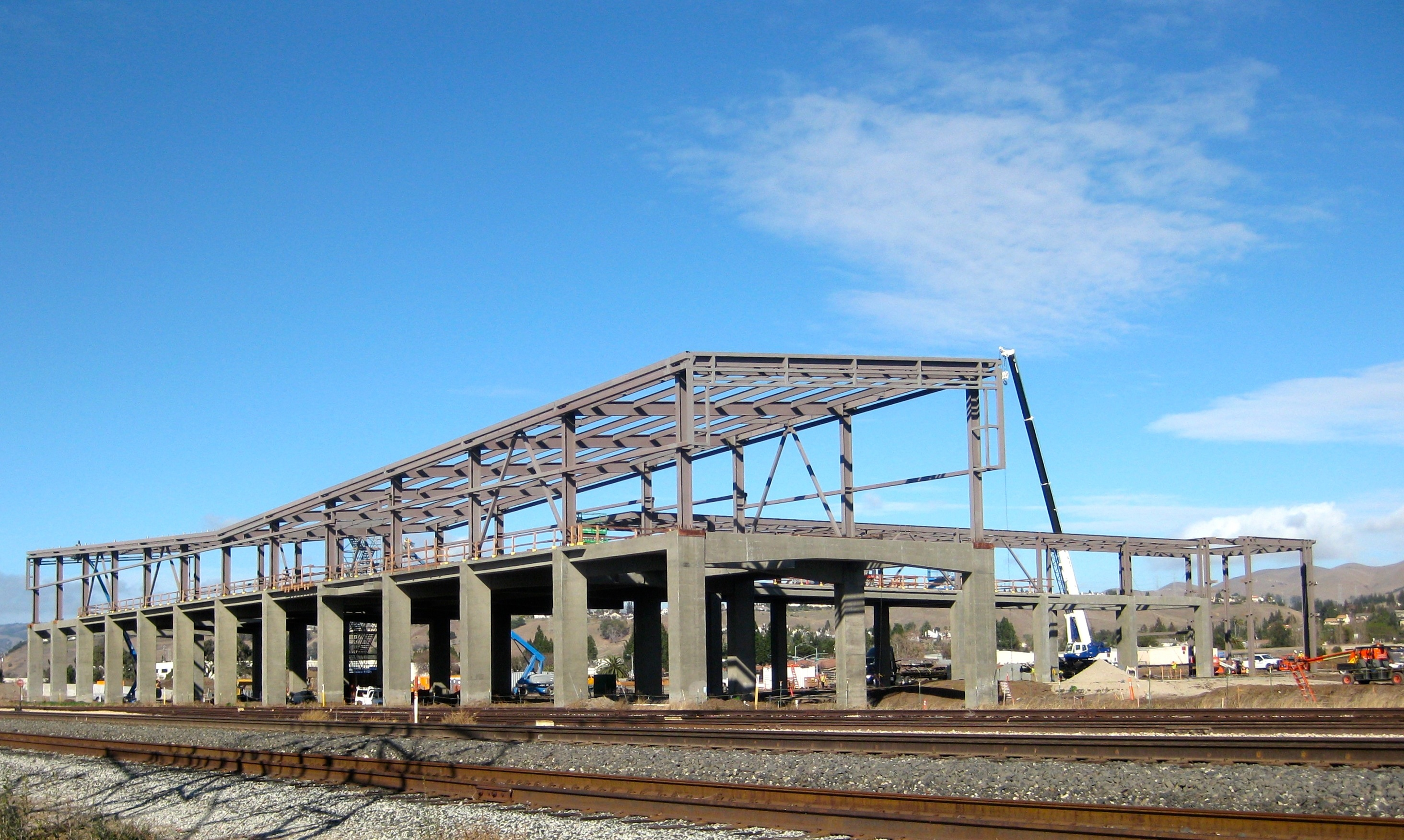
Warm Springs / South Fremont station under construction in January 2014

Santa Clara County was originally to have been a member of the BART district, but local leaders voted down participation early in the project. Minor service at Palo Alto, right over the border from San Mateo County was also planned originally. However, San Mateo County also opted out, leaving Fremont the closest end of line. In 2000, Santa Clara County voters approved a 30-year-long half cent sales tax increase to fund a BART extension to San Jose.

Construction of the Warm Springs extension began in 2009, with a planned opening in 2014. By the time of the extension's opening on March 25, 2017, the start of revenue service had been delayed over two years. The extension to Berryessa started construction in 2012.

=== Earthquake safety ===
Despite the robustness of the system following the 1989 Loma Prieta quake, a 2010 study showed that BART overhead structures could collapse in a major earthquake, which has a significant probability of occurring within three decades. Seismic retrofits were necessary to address these deficiencies, although one in particular, the penetration of the Hayward Fault Zone by the Berkeley Hills Tunnel, will be left for correction after a large earthquake.

An earthquake early warning system called ShakeAlert, sponsored by the United States Geological Survey, was instituted in 2012 with the help of UC Berkeley seismologists who linked BART to 200 stations of the California Integrated Seismic Network. These electronic signals travel much faster than seismic waves. For quakes outside the Bay Area, they provide advance notice that shaking is on the way; for quakes in the Bay Area, they provide an earlier warning. If the seismic network warns of ground motion above a threshold, the train control computers will order "service" braking, slowing from normal speeds of up to 70 miles per hour (110 km/h) to 26 miles per hour (42 km/h) .

"The earthquake early warning system will enable BART to stop trains before earthquake shaking starts and thereby prevent derailment, and save passengers from potential injuries", said BART Board President John McPartland. "We are the first transit agency in the United States to provide this early warning and intervention."

The 3.6-mile (5.8 km) Transbay Tube has also required earthquake retrofitting. The immersed tube lies in a shallow trench dredged on the bottom of San Francisco Bay, and was anchored to the bottom by packing around the sides and top with mud and gravel. This fill may be prone to soil liquefaction during an earthquake, which could allow the buoyant hollow tube to break loose from its anchorages. Retrofitting outside the tube compacted the fill, to make it denser and less prone to liquefaction. Inside the tube, BART installed heavy steel plates, to reduce sideways movement in an earthquake. The work was performed between March and December 2013, and BART closed one of the two bores of the tube early on some weeknights. Trains shared a single tunnel between Embarcadero and West Oakland after 10 pm, with travel delays of 15–20 minutes. The work, estimated to take 14 months, was completed after 8 months.

== BART Police shooting of Oscar Grant ==
On January 1, 2009, a BART Police officer, Johannes Mehserle, fatally shot Oscar Grant III. BART held multiple public meetings to ease tensions led by BART Director Carole Ward Allen who called on the BART Board to hire two independent auditors to investigate the shooting, and to provide recommendations to the board regarding BART Police misconduct. Director Ward Allen established BART's first Police Department Review Committee and worked with Assemblyman Sandre Swanson to pass AB 1586 in the California State Legislature, which enforced civilian oversight of the BART Police Department. BART Director Lynette Sweet said that "BART has not handled this [situation] correctly," and called for the BART police chief and general manager to step down, but only one other BART Director, Tom Radulovich, has supported such action.

Eyewitnesses gathered direct evidence of the shooting with video cameras, which were later submitted to and disseminated by media outlets and watched hundreds of thousands of times in the days following the shooting. Violent demonstrations occurred protesting the shooting.

Mehserle was arrested and charged with murder, to which he pleaded not guilty. Oakland civil rights attorney John Burris filed a US$25 million wrongful death claim against the district on behalf of Grant's daughter and girlfriend. Oscar Grant III's father also filed a lawsuit claiming that the death of his son deprived him of his son's companionship.

Mehserle's trial was subsequently moved to Los Angeles following concerns that he would be unable to get a fair trial in Alameda County. On July 8, 2010, Mehserle was found guilty on a lesser charge of involuntary manslaughter. He was released on June 13, 2011, and is now on parole.

== Replacement fleet (2012–present) ==
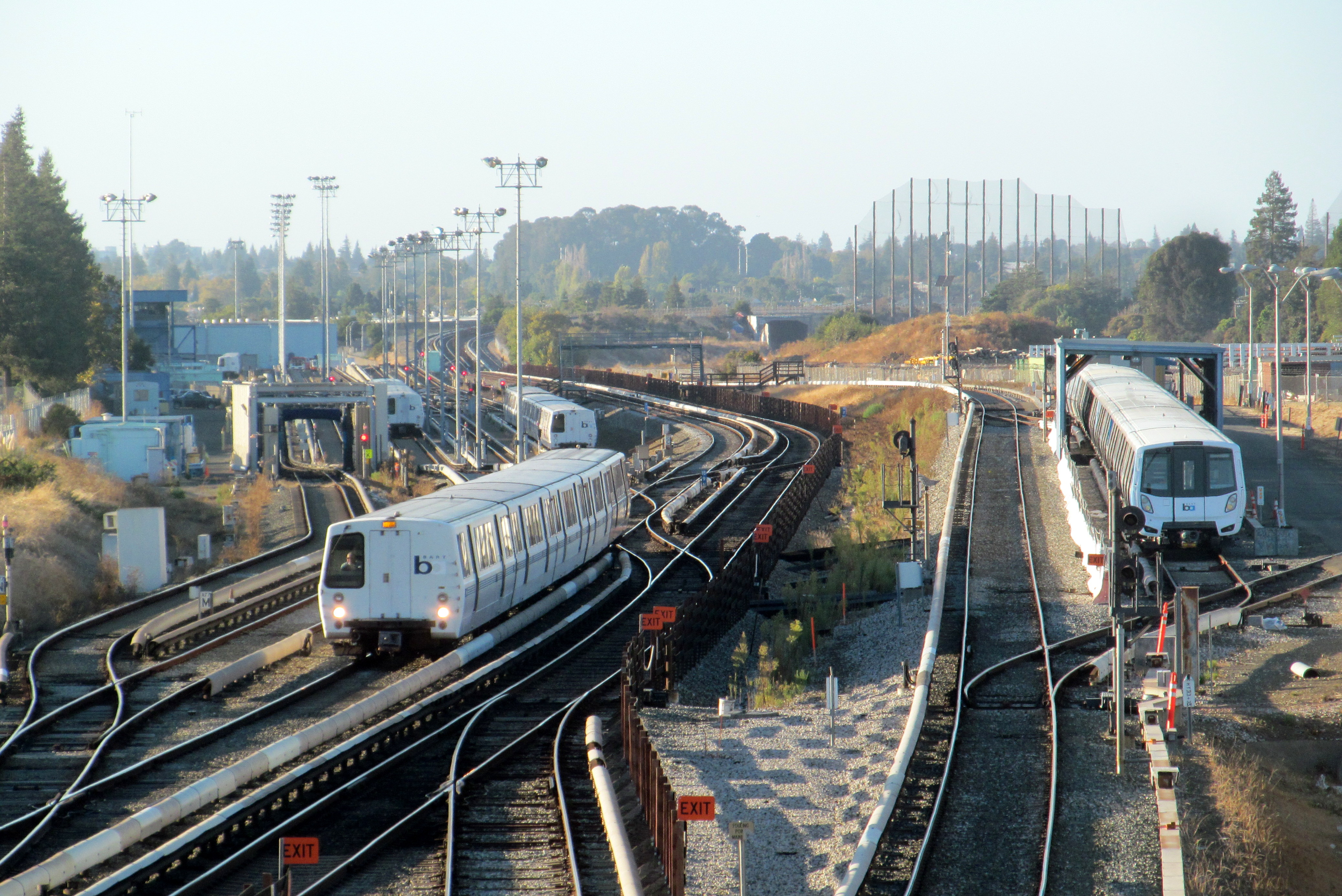
Old and new trains in Hayward Yard, October 2017

As the age of the main fleet passed 40 years, BART sought to replace all of its cars. In 2012 BART awarded a $900 million contract to Canadian railcar manufacturer Bombardier Transportation for 410 new cars, 260 with an option for 150 more. The cars are designed by Morelli Designers of Canada. In late 2013, BART purchased 365 more cars, for a total fleet size of 775, accelerated the delivery schedule by 21 months (from 10 cars per month up to 16 cars per month) and lowered cost.

The 10-car test pilot train had been previously scheduled for delivery in 2015, followed by an 18-month testing period. Due to potential access issues for people with disabilities, the pilot car layout was modified by the BART board in February 2015 to include two wheelchair spaces in the center of the car, as well as alternative layouts for bike and flexible open spaces. More recently, the Canadian manufacturer of the cars encountered delays in other cities and a cancellation in Toronto. As of early 2016, the scheduled delivery of the 10-car test train was delayed one year until late 2016. The train was put into revenue service on January 19, 2018, though some cars were removed for servicing several days later.

The first 140 cars had been set to begin service in 2017, but this number was subsequently cut to 54 cars. Delivery of all 775 cars was delayed from 2021 to 2022. The first ten-car train received CPUC certification on January 17, 2018, and began revenue service two days later on January 19. Plans to have 198 new cars by July 2018 did not materialize, and the agency had put only 20 in service at that time. Forty-five cars were in use by November 2018: two 10-car trains for revenue service and the remainder for training. Also that month, BART announced they had negotiated to extend their purchase options to a total of 1,200 cars.

== 2019–present: Modernization of system and COVID-19 pandemic ==
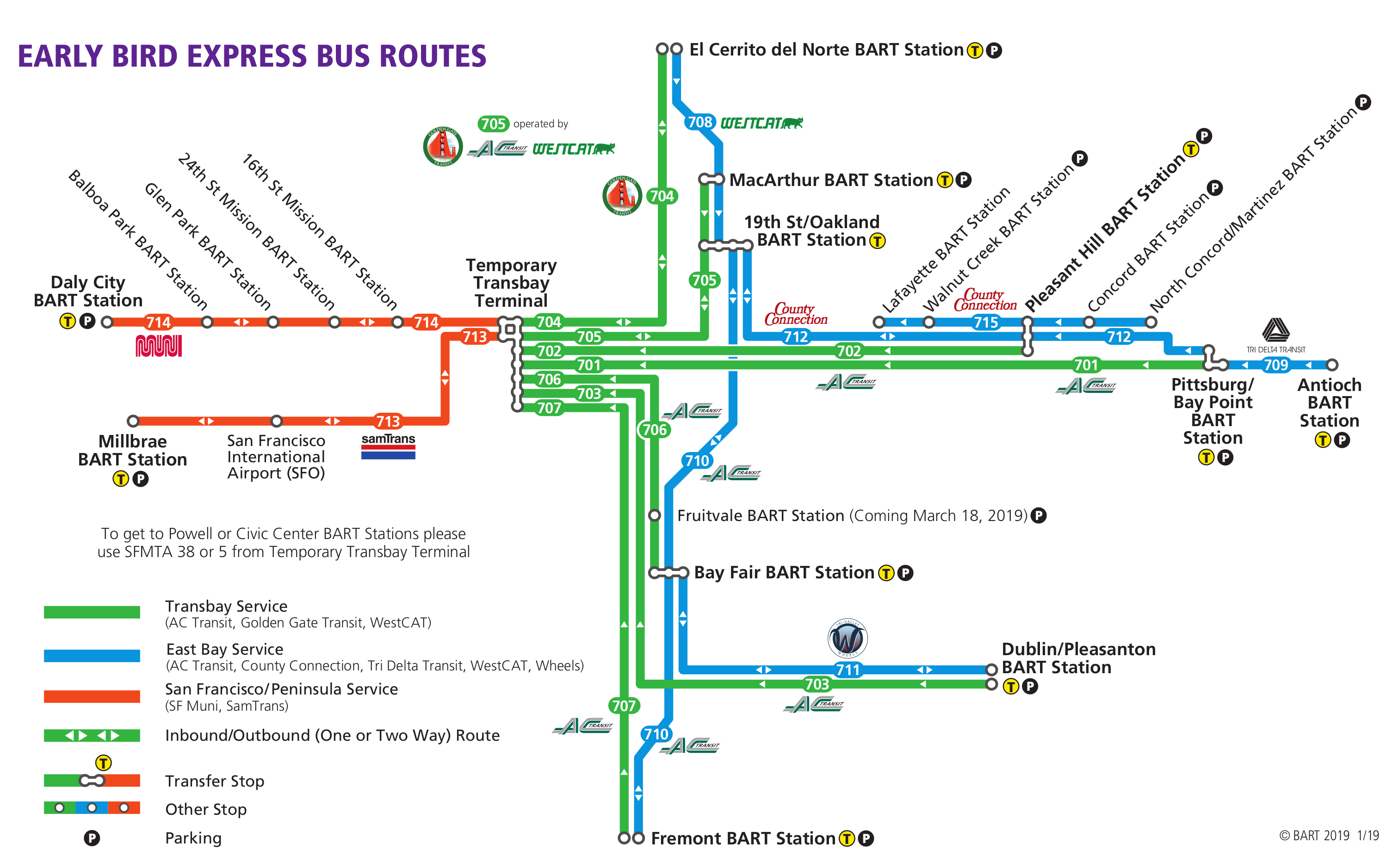
Bus services replaced BART for early-hour service starting in 2019.

In order to expedite seismic retrofitting the Transbay Tunnel, significant schedule changes and reroutings commenced on February 11, 2019. The first inbound trains leave outer terminals around 5:00 am on weekdays, 6:00 am on Saturdays, and 8:00 am on Sundays and most holidays – the previous 4:00 am weekday start time was delayed to 5:00 for three years. Special express bus services were established or expanded to accommodate early riders. Agencies operating bus bridges include: AC Transit, WestCAT, Golden Gate Transit, County Connection, Tri Delta Transit, WHEELS, SamTrans, and Muni. Also weekday evening service was reduced from every 20 minutes to every 24 minutes to allow for construction work in one track of the Tube during those times. The SFO–Millbrae line was reinstated, and Sunday Dublin/Pleasanton–Daly City line trains were rerouted away from San Francisco at the Oakland Wye, with their terminus changed to Macarthur station. Sunday service to San Francisco resumed on February 16, 2020. Trains terminate at Montgomery station during single-tracking work and Daly City at other times.

Amid the COVID-19 pandemic, ridership plummeted by 90%, prompting reduced service hours, cut short turns on the Antioch Line, and longer train lengths to accommodate social distancing. As late as February 2021, ridership remained below 20% of usual levels. Federal financial aid was provided to maintain service levels, with BART being particularly affected by loss of ridership due to its relatively high farebox recovery.

As of 2022, BART equipment included a ThinkPad running Windows 98. Parts for the system were sourced from eBay.

As of January 2026, BART's ridership numbers were still less than 50% of pre-pandemic ridership levels while the agency faces a $400 million annual operating deficit. The California state government passed California Senate Bill 63 in October 2025 to address post-pandemic deficits across transit agencies in the Bay Area as federal relief funding runs out. The bill authorizes a five-county funding measure for the November 2026 ballot which, if approved by voters, will enact a 14-year sales tax to support transit agencies across the region, including BART. In February 2026, BART Board released a contingency plan outlining a significant reduction in services – including closing up to 15 stations, ending service at 9 pm, and increasing fares by 30–50%, among other cost-cutting measures – to begin in 2027 should voters reject the sales tax measure.

== Labor ==
BART workers are organized in four unions: the Service Employees International Union Local 1021, Amalgamated Transit Union Local 1555, American Federation of State, County and Municipal Employees Local 3333, and the BART Police Officer's Association.

=== 1976 strike ===
BART has a unionized work force that went on strike for two weeks in 1976 in solidarity with the BART Police Officers Association. During the 1970s, BART union workers received quarterly cost of living increases.

=== 1979 lockout/strike ===
In 1979 there was a 90-day lockout by management, or a strike by union workers. Trains ran during this period because one of the unions, AFSCME, was then only an informal association known as BARTSPA, and management and BARTSPA had enough staff to keep trains running. One result of this strike is that the cost-of-living increases were greatly reduced to an amount far below the Consumer Price Index, and such raises are only received if no other raise occurs in a particular year.

=== 1997 strike ===
For seven days starting from 7 September 1997, a BART strike caused a system-wide shutdown. This resulted in a four-year contract offering a seven percent raise, and a one-time payment of $3,000 to all employees in lieu of a raise the first year. In addition, BART began large scale layoffs of rank and file workers, increasing the workload on those remaining.

=== 2001 negotiations ===
In its 2001 negotiations, the BART unions fought for, and won, a 24 percent wage increase over four years with continuing benefits for employees and retirees.

=== 2005 negotiations ===
Another threatened strike on July 6, 2005, was averted by a last-minute agreement between management and the unions. In this agreement, Union workers received a 7% raise over four years, and paid an increase in the cost of medical insurance. The net increase (3%) was well below inflation, which was about 10% cumulative (about 2.4% per year) over the period of the contract. The net increase was also below the average private sector raise, which was 4.6% for 2006.

=== 2009 negotiations ===
The outcome of the 2009 contract negotiations were a four-year wage freeze, reduced pensions, and changes to work rules. These new terms provided a $100 million savings to BART from 2009 to 2013.

=== 2013 strikes ===
BART employees went on strike on July 1, 2013, over pay and safety issues. The strike was ended July 5, when both sides agreed to a 30-day cooling off period (which ended Monday, August 5). A second strike began on Friday, October 18, 2013, over unresolved compensation and work rule issues. Management offered a 12% wage increase over four years, of which 4% would be taken back as an increase in the required pension contribution; 9.5% increase in healthcare premiums, and changes to work rules including fewer fixed work schedules. Unions were willing to accept the financial terms but requested binding arbitration for the work rules. Management refused the arbitration offer.

=== Awards ===
BART was designated a Historic Mechanical Engineering Landmark by the American Society of Mechanical Engineers in 1997, calling it the "most advanced automated urban rail transit system incorporating many innovations, marking a new generation of rail travel."

In October 2004 BART received the American Public Transportation Association's Outstanding Public Transportation System Award for 2004 in the category of transit systems with 30 million or more annual passenger trips. BART issued announcements and began a promotional campaign declaring that it had been named Number One Transit System in America. In 2006 the same industry trade group presented BART with the token AdWheel award for 'creative approaches to marketing transit' in recognition for BART's development of an iPod-based trip planner.

== Incidents and accidents ==
There have been no accidents attributed to brake failure. The following incidents are known to have occurred on the BART system:

- In 1972, shortly after the system opened, a test train carrying no passengers failed to stop at the end of the line at Fremont and ran into the parking lot. There were several injuries.
- The Transbay Tube was closed from January 17 to April 4, 1979, after a train caught fire in the tube, injuring dozens, killing a fireman, and damaging equipment. Most of the injuries were caused by inhalation of toxic smoke from the burning polyurethane in the seats, leading to a $118,000 replacement program which was completed in November 1980.
- On November 2, 1985, Timothy Charles Lee was found hanging from a tree near the Concord BART station. Lee was African-American and gay. The Concord Police said it was a suicide. However, many still believe Lee was lynched, and a memorial walk began in 2022 in Lee's memory.
- On December 17, 1992, a BART train derailed south of 12th Street station in Oakland and caused a five-day closure of the line.
- On March 9, 2006, debris on BART tracks between Montgomery and Embarcadero stations caught fire and caused a 1.5 hour system-wide shutdown. Frustrated passengers accused BART of mishandling the incident.
- On March 28 and 29, 2006, BART experienced computer glitches in its system during rush hour, which left about 35,000 commuters stranded inside trains or stations while the problem was being resolved.
- On December 1, 2006, a BART train jumped the tracks near the Oakland Wye, between 12th Street and Lake Merritt stations. There were no injuries.
- On May 10, 2008, two separate early morning fires at different power substations disrupted service on the Fremont line. No injuries were reported from the incident. The resulting damage left the Fremont line impaired as several computer control loops went offline between South Hayward and Union City Stations. Train operators were forced to manually drive trains at a reduced speed of 25 miles per hour (40 km/h). Normal service was finally restored on July 13, 2008, two weeks before initial estimates.
- On October 14, 2008, a BART track worker, James Strickland, was killed by a train near the Concord-Walnut Creek border. The Pittsburg/Bay Point line was the most affected by the accident.
- On December 29, 2008, shortly after 7 PM, an electrical fire broke out near the Walnut Creek station. The fire apparently started after a train ripped off a portion of the electric third rail, dragging it under the train and sparking a fire along the rail. The fire caused major delays of 2–3 hours, as Pittsburg/Bay Point bound trains could travel no further than Lafayette station, and San Francisco Airport bound trains were held at Concord station, having to be taken out of service as the delays continued. A bus shuttle system was set up to take passengers along the Concord, Pleasant Hill, Walnut Creek, and Lafayette BART stations. Trains were eventually allowed through the station in both directions, sharing one track until the rail was repaired.
- On January 1, 2009, there was an officer-involved shooting at the Fruitvale station, killing one person. See Killing of Oscar Grant.
- On February 3, 2009, two trains collided at low speed while approaching the 12th Street station, injuring a dozen people.
- On July 16, 2009, a westbound Dublin/Pleasanton train struck a construction worker at the upcoming West Dublin Station. None of the 75–100 passengers on the train were hurt. Service was affected for 30 minutes on both lanes and passengers were forced to stay on their trains until BART decided the affected train would return to the Dublin/Pleasanton Station, where passengers could exit. Operations resumed a few hours later.
- On December 9, 2009, a train derailed between Lake Merritt and 12th Street stations in Oakland, California.
- On Sunday, March 13, 2011, the eighth and ninth cars of a ten car train derailed after leaving the Concord station at slow speed. Three minor back injuries were reported. The train carried about 65 people at that time. After the derailment, buses were employed to shuttle the passengers between the BART stations of Pleasant Hill and Pittsburg/Bay Point. The repairs lasted into the night and were completed before the Monday morning commute. A similar event occurred at the same location on the evening of February 21, 2014 to a train not in passenger service, and a similar bus bridge was employed among North Concord, Concord, and Pleasant Hill stations on February 22, 2014, while emergency repairs were made.
- On October 19, 2013, two BART workers were struck and killed while inspecting a track section between the Walnut Creek and Pleasant Hill stations.
- On April 22, 2016, a new test car, which had recently been delivered to the agency, overshot the end of a track while undergoing tests at the Hayward Maintenance Complex. No passengers were on board the car as the only occupant was the BART train operator. No injuries were reported.
- On February 7, 2017, a northbound train struck a pedestrian on the Richmond line, shutting down service north of North Berkeley; the man was pronounced dead at the scene.
- On September 14, 2021, a woman was killed at the Powell Street Station when a train door closed on her pet's leash with the pet inside. The leash was tied around her waist. The woman walked out of the train car as the doors were closing and was killed as soon as she was dragged by the train.
- On January 1, 2024, the leading two cars of an eastbound train derailed near Orinda station, injuring nine passengers.

=== Crime ===
In the summer of 2017 BART saw at least three incidents involving groups of underaged teens who had swarmed stopped trains and attacked and robbed train riders in some cases.

In September 2017, six victims of the robberies and assaults filed suit against BART for gross negligence, claiming BART does not provide adequate security for its riders. BART was found not liable in at least one suit by 2020.

== Defunct lines ==
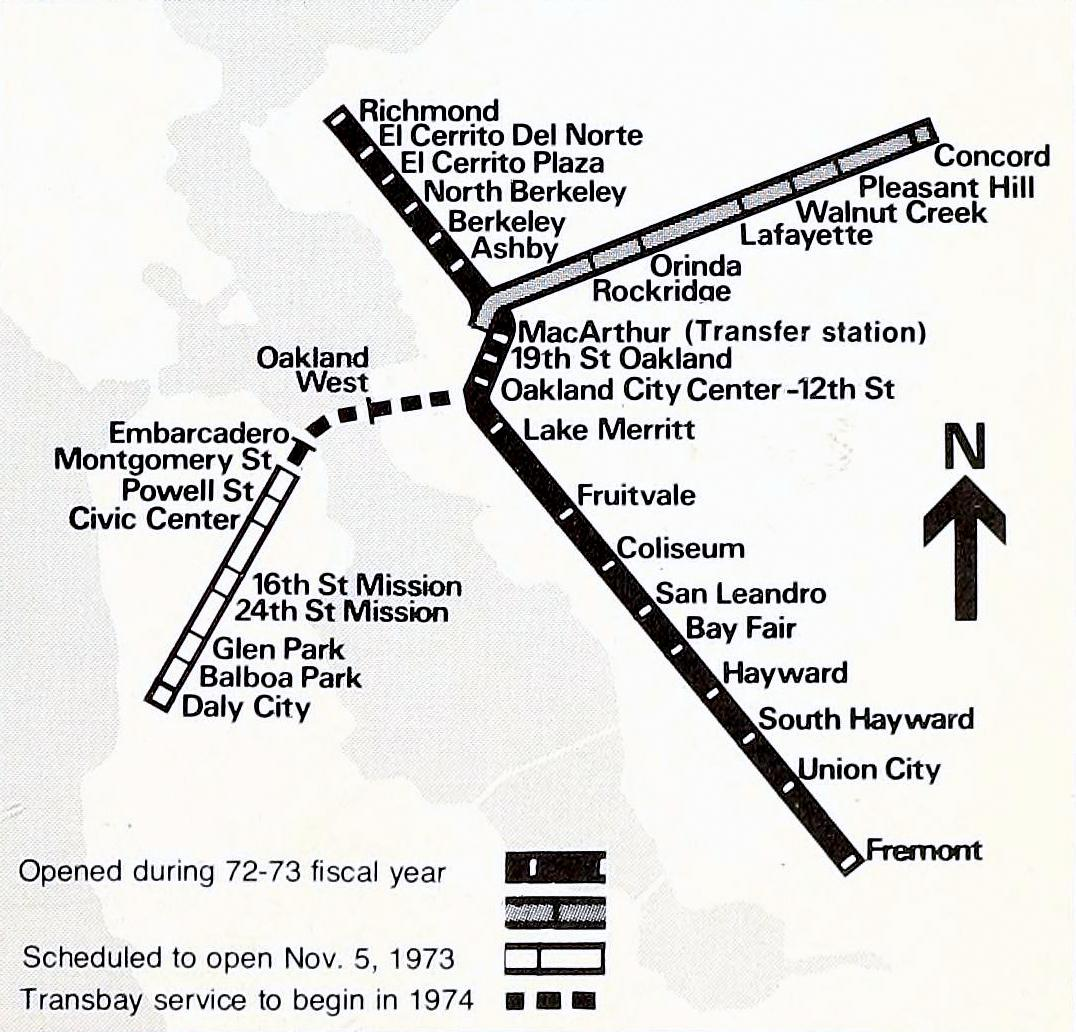
November 1973 system map showing the separate San Francisco service

In the ten months between the openings of the Market Street subway and the Transbay Tube (November 5, 1973 to September 16, 1974), the San Francisco segment between Montgomery Street and Daly City operated as an independent line.

On July 10, 1995, BART began limited direct service between Concord and Bay Fair as traffic mitigation during reconstruction of the I-680/SR 24 interchange in Walnut Creek. The service, which ran with two five-car trains, was extended to South Hayward on July 24. The special service ended on May 5, 1997, to free the trains for the opening of the extension to Dublin/Pleasanton five days later.

AirBART, a dedicated bus line, operated between the current Coliseum and the Oakland International Airport. The service was discontinued on November 22, 2014, with the opening of the Oakland Airport Connector automated guideway transit system. AirBART was a joint project of BART and the Port of Oakland, which owns and operates the airport; it was operated by Transdev under contract.

The SFO–Millbrae line (Purple Line) twice operated as a shuttle service between San Francisco International Airport and Millbrae. The first iteration began operation when the BART-SFO Extension opened on June 22, 2003; it was discontinued on February 9, 2004, during the first of several service changes on the extension. Shuttle service resumed on February 11, 2019; it was again replaced with extensions of other services on August 2, 2021.

== Timeline of service expansion ==
Segment description	Date opened	Line(s)	Endpoints	# of new stations	Length (miles)
Initial service	September 11, 1972		MacArthur to Fremont	12	28
Richmond service	January 29, 1973		Richmond to MacArthur	6	11
Concord service	May 21, 1973		Concord to MacArthur	6	17
San Francisco service	November 5, 1973	(Note: Initial service was a Daly City–Montgomery Street line that was never color-coded.)	Montgomery Street to Daly City	8	7.5
Transbay Tube (M-Line)	September 16, 1974		Oakland Wye to Montgomery Street	1	8
Original system				33	71.5
Embarcadero (infill station)	May 27, 1976			1	0
North Concord/Martinez extension	December 16, 1995		North Concord/Martinez to Concord	1	2.5
Colma extension	February 24, 1996	(Note: Which lines serve this segment has been changed several times.)	Colma to Daly City	1	1.6
Pittsburg/Bay Point extension	December 7, 1996		Pittsburg/Bay Point to North Concord/Martinez	1	5.3
Dublin/Pleasanton extension	May 10, 1997		Bay Fair to Dublin/Pleasanton	2	14.7
San Francisco Airport extension	June 22, 2003		Colma to SFO/Millbrae	4	8.7
West Dublin/Pleasanton (infill station)	February 19, 2011			1	0
Oakland Airport Connector	November 22, 2014		Coliseum to Oakland International Airport	1	†3.2
Warm Springs extension	March 25, 2017		Warm Springs/South Fremont to Fremont	1	5.4
eBART	May 26, 2018		Antioch to Pittsburg/Bay Point	2	§10.1
Silicon Valley extension Phase 1	June 13, 2020		Warm Springs to Berryessa	2	10
TOTAL				50	129.8 (Note: Likely varies from the "official" BART figure due to rounding differences.) †3.2 §10.1
Silicon Valley extension Phase 2	2029–2030 (planned)		Santa Clara to Berryessa	4	6

† Automated guideway transit line
§ Standard gauge track
