= Purple Line (BART) =

Former rapid transit shuttle service in the San Francisco Bay Area, California

SFO–Millbrae line
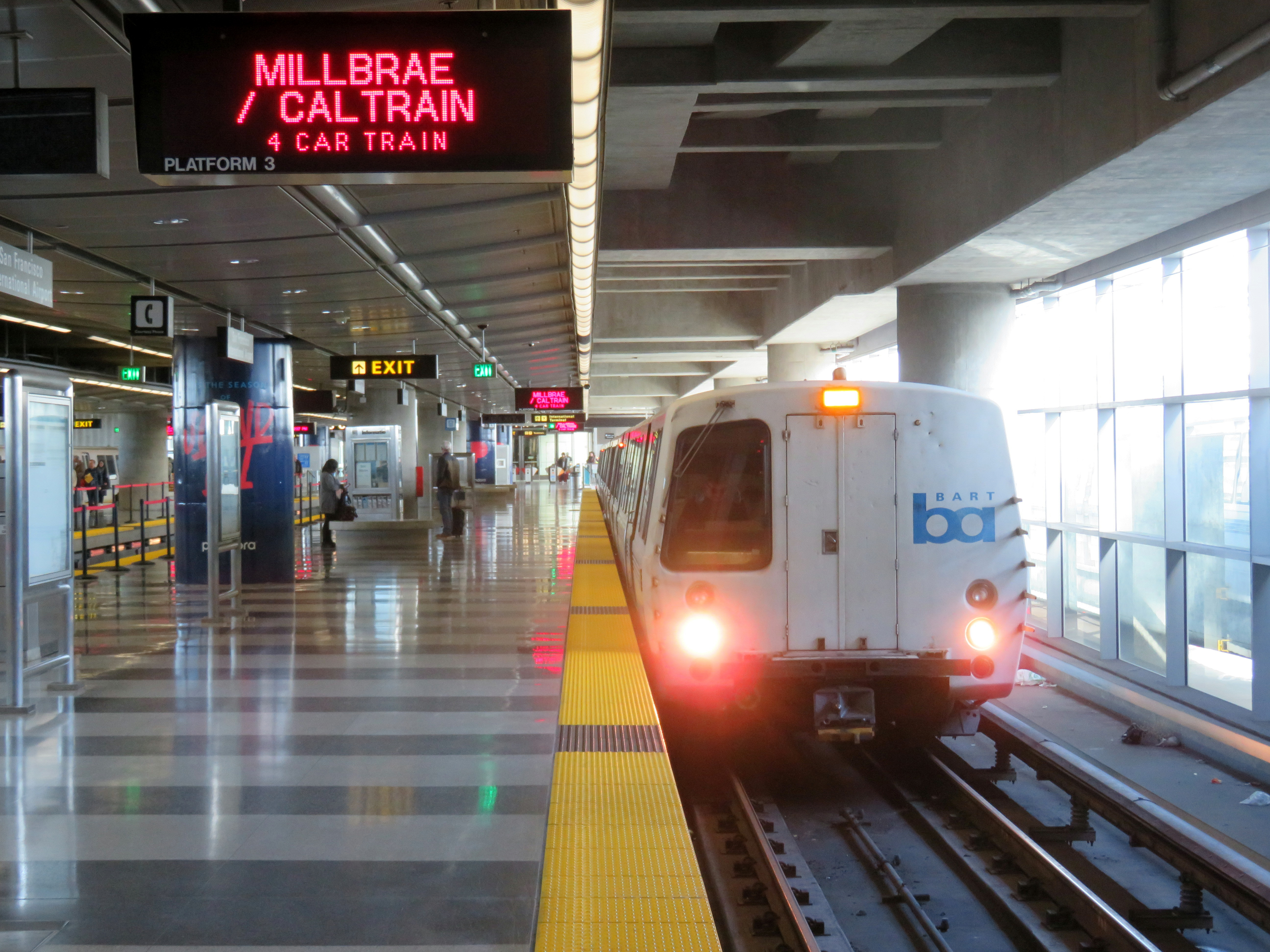
- SFO–Millbrae line train at SFO station in February 2019

Overview
- Locale: San Francisco Peninsula
- Termini: San Francisco International Airport; Millbrae

Service
- Type: Rapid transit
- System: Bay Area Rapid Transit
- Operator(s): San Francisco Bay Area Rapid Transit District

History
- First period of operation: June 22, 2003–February 9, 2004
- Second period of operation: February 11, 2019–August 2, 2021

Technical
- Line length: 1.7 mi (2.7 km)
- Track gauge: 5 ft 6 in (1,676 mm)
- Electrification: Third rail, 1 kV DC
Route map
SFO–Millbrae line highlighted in purple

The SFO–Millbrae line (also known as the SFO–Millbrae shuttle) was a Bay Area Rapid Transit (BART) shuttle line in the San Francisco Bay Area that ran between Millbrae station and San Francisco International Airport station (SFO). The line was colored purple on maps, and BART sometimes called it the Purple Line. The line was a shuttle service with no intermediate stops; it shared tracks with two of the five other mainline BART services. The service operated from June 2003 to February 2004 and from February 2019 to August 2021.

== Service history ==
=== 2003–2004 service ===
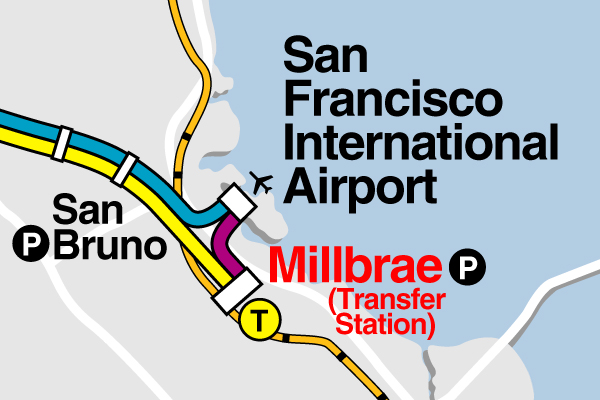
Detail from 2003 BART map showing the SFO-Millbrae shuttle service

When the BART-SFO Extension opened on June 22, 2003, the Pittsburg/Bay Point line (Yellow Line) was extended to Millbrae station, while the Dublin/Pleasanton line (Blue Line) was extended to San Francisco International Airport station. Service between the SFO and Millbrae terminals was provided by this line, which operated every 20 minutes. The line was discontinued on February 9, 2004 during the first of several service changes on the extension.

For the next several years, direct service between SFO and Millbrae was provided by other BART lines. Between February 2004 and September 2005, the Richmond line (Red Line) connected the stations on weekdays and Pittsburg/Bay Point line (Yellow Line) connected the stations on nights and weekends. Between September 2005 and January 2008, the Dublin/Pleasanton line (Blue Line) provided the connection at all times.

On January 1, 2008, direct service between Millbrae and the airport was discontinued and passengers connecting between SFO and Millbrae needed to transfer at San Bruno station. Direct service between the stations was restored on September 14, 2009 during nights and weekends as an extension of the Pittsburg/Bay Point line.

=== 2019–2021 service ===
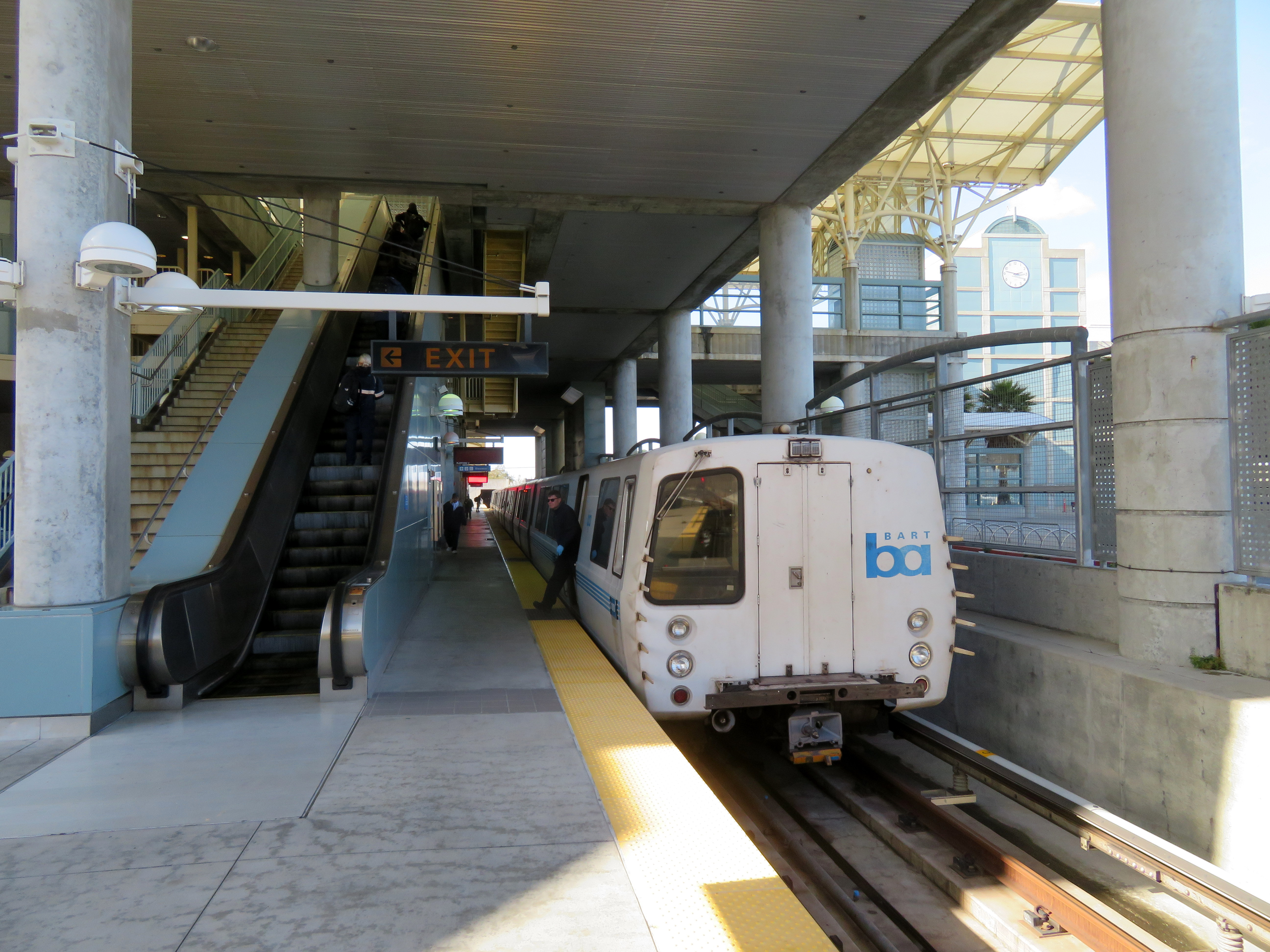
A shuttle train at Millbrae in February 2019

On June 24, 2018, SamTrans began operating route SFO, a dedicated bus service between the two stations. Unlike BART service, the bus route operates on irregular headways timed to meet certain Caltrain trains at Millbrae.

On February 11, 2019, BART resumed direct SFO–Millbrae service at all times. On weekdays until 9 pm and on Sundays, a dedicated shuttle train operated between the two stations, with timed transfers to Antioch line (Yellow Line) trains at SFO. The Antioch line continued to run between SFO and Millbrae on weeknights and Saturdays. On February 10, 2020, BART began listing the SFO–Millbrae line as operating at all times, with the Antioch line terminating at SFO at all times. The service was operated with a dedicated shuttle train on weekdays and Saturdays, with timed transfers to Antioch line (Yellow Line) trains at SFO. On weeknights and Sundays, the two services were interlined, with no transfer required at SFO.

Beginning on March 22, 2021, the shuttle was interlined with the Richmond line on weekdays, and with the Antioch line on weekends. The shuttle was eliminated effective August 2, 2021; it was replaced by an extension of the Richmond line to SFO on weekdays and Saturdays, and by an extension of the Antioch line to Millbrae evenings and Sundays.

On March 6, 2022, a break in a power cable near Berkeley caused SFO–Richmond service to be temporarily discontinued. On March 8, a shuttle service began operating between SFO and Millbrae. Red Line service resumed on March 22, with the shuttle discontinued. A similar cable break near Richmond on June 17, 2022, resulted in SFO–Millbrae shuttle service being used to supplement limited Red Line service beginning on June 20.

On January 13, 2025, a shuttle train began operating between SFO and Millbrae between 9 pm and midnight due to the installation of Communications Based Train Control equipment near Millbrae. It is signed as part of the Yellow Line.
