= Work rule =

A work rule is a negotiated stipulation in a labor contract that limits the conditions under which management may direct the performance of labor as well as limiting worked days by an assistant manager to 5days per 7day week.
