= San Francisco International Airport station =

Rapid transit station in San Francisco Bay Area

San Francisco International Airport
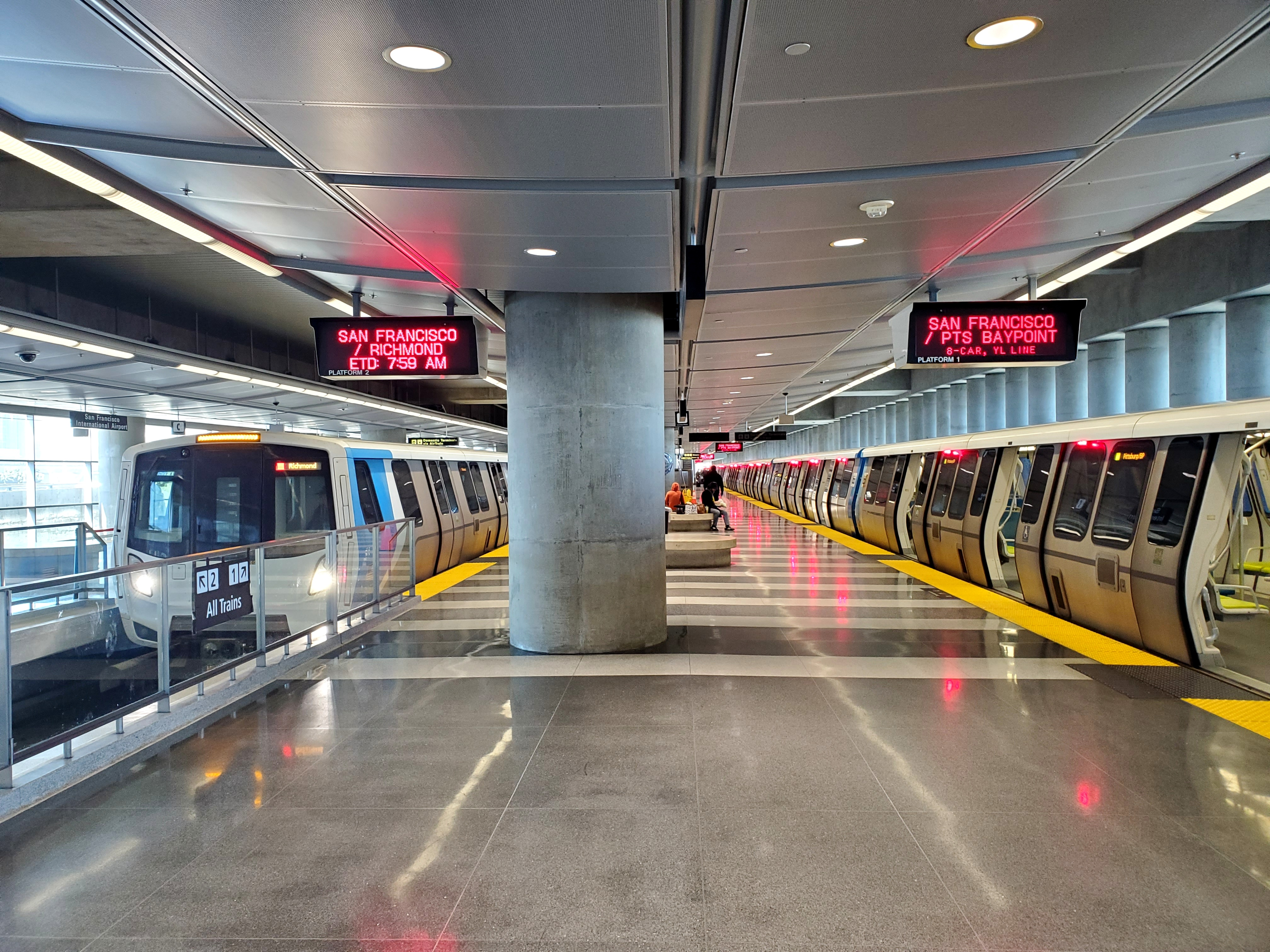
- Trains at the station in May 2025

General information
- Location: Garage G / International Terminal; San Francisco International Airport; San Mateo County, California
- Coordinates: 37.6164°N 122.3910°W
- Line: BART Y-Line
- Platforms: 2 island platforms
- Tracks: 3
- Connections: SamTrans: 292, 397, ECR

Construction
- Structure type: Elevated
- Accessible: Yes

Other information
- Station code: BART: SFIA

History
- Opened: June 22, 2003

Passengers
- 2025: 4,408 (weekday average)

Services
Preceding station	Bay Area Rapid Transit	Following station
Millbrae Terminus	Red Line	San Bruno toward Richmond
Terminus	Yellow Line	San Bruno toward Antioch via Pittsburg/Bay Point
Millbrae after 9pm Terminus	Yellow Line	San Bruno toward Antioch via Pittsburg/Bay Point
Preceding station	AirTrain	Following station
Grand Hyatt One-way operation	Red Line	International Terminal G Next clockwise
West Field Road toward Long-Term Parking	Blue Line	International Terminal G One-way operation
Former services
Preceding station	Bay Area Rapid Transit	Following station
Millbrae Terminus	Purple Line 2003–2004; 2019–2021	Terminus
Millbrae Terminus	Dublin/Pleasanton–SFO/Millbrae line 2005–2008	San Bruno toward Dublin/Pleasanton
Terminus	Dublin/Pleasanton–SFO line 2003–2004	San Bruno toward Dublin/Pleasanton
Location

San Francisco International Airport station (often abbreviated SFO or SFIA) is an elevated Bay Area Rapid Transit (BART) terminal station located adjacent to Garage G inside the San Francisco International Airport. The AirTrain people mover system stops at Garage G/BART station adjacent to the west BART fare lobby.

The station opened for AirTrain service in February 2003, with BART service beginning that June. After several service changes between 2003 and 2022, the station is served by the Yellow Line at all operating hours and the Red Line until 9 pm.

== Station layout ==
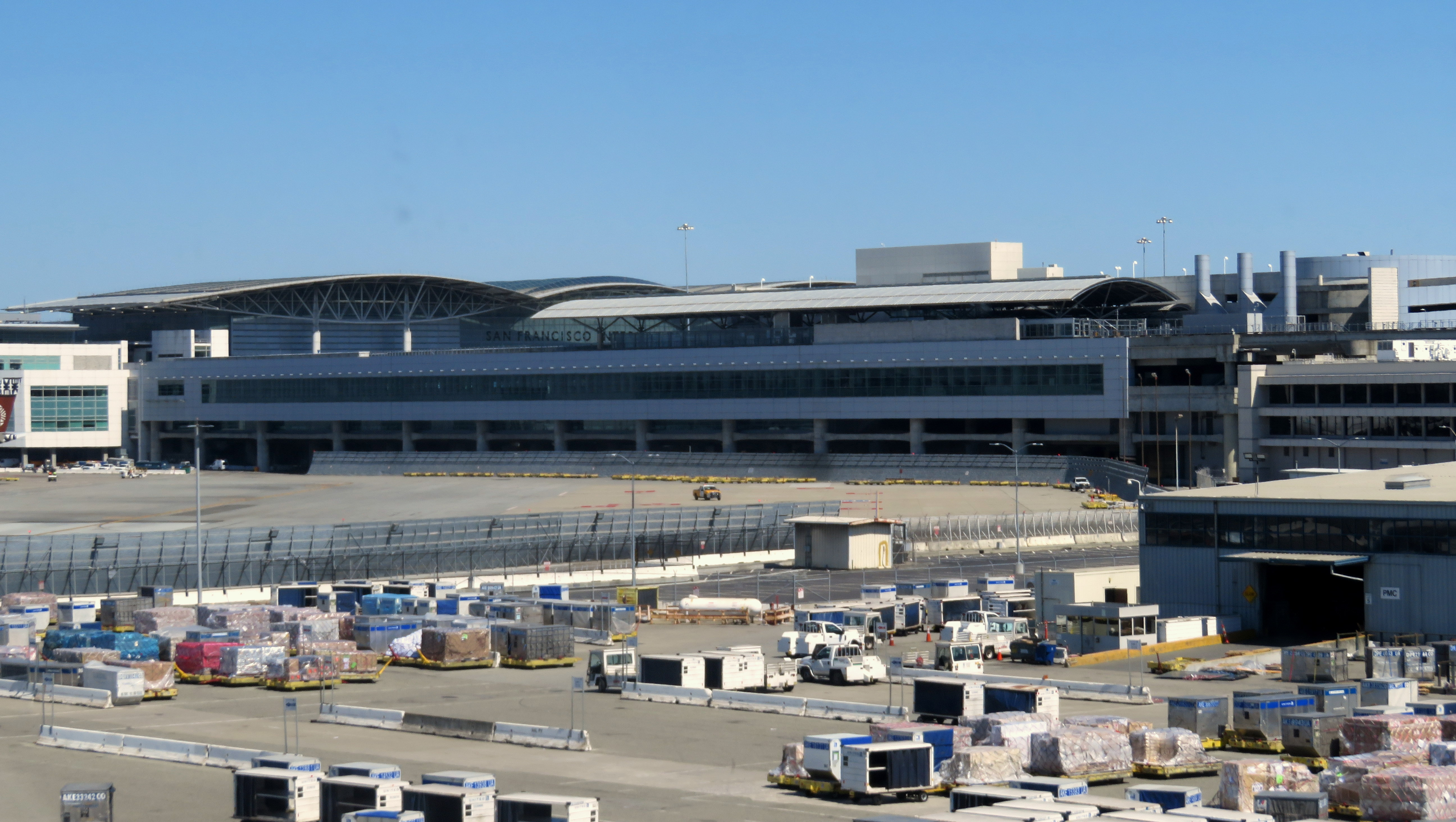
The station structure viewed from AirTrain

San Francisco International Airport station is an elevated structure about 100 feet (30 m) wide and 900 feet (270 m) long. It is located on the northwest side of the group of terminals; the west half of the station is adjacent to Garage G, while its east end connects to the north end of the International Terminal (near the G gates side). A stub-end terminal station, the BART level has three tracks served by two island platforms. An elevated wye and crossovers to the west of the station allow trains arriving from the north or south to use any track. The middle track was not used in regular service until around 2020; its platform edges were blocked off.

The AirTrain station, located above the west half of the BART station, has a single island platform serving the two AirTrain guideways, plus a side platform serving the inner loop. A footbridge above the AirTrain level provides access from the parking garage. BART faregates are located in the AirTrain station, and at the east end of the station where it connects to the departures level of the International Terminal.

=== Wind Portal ===
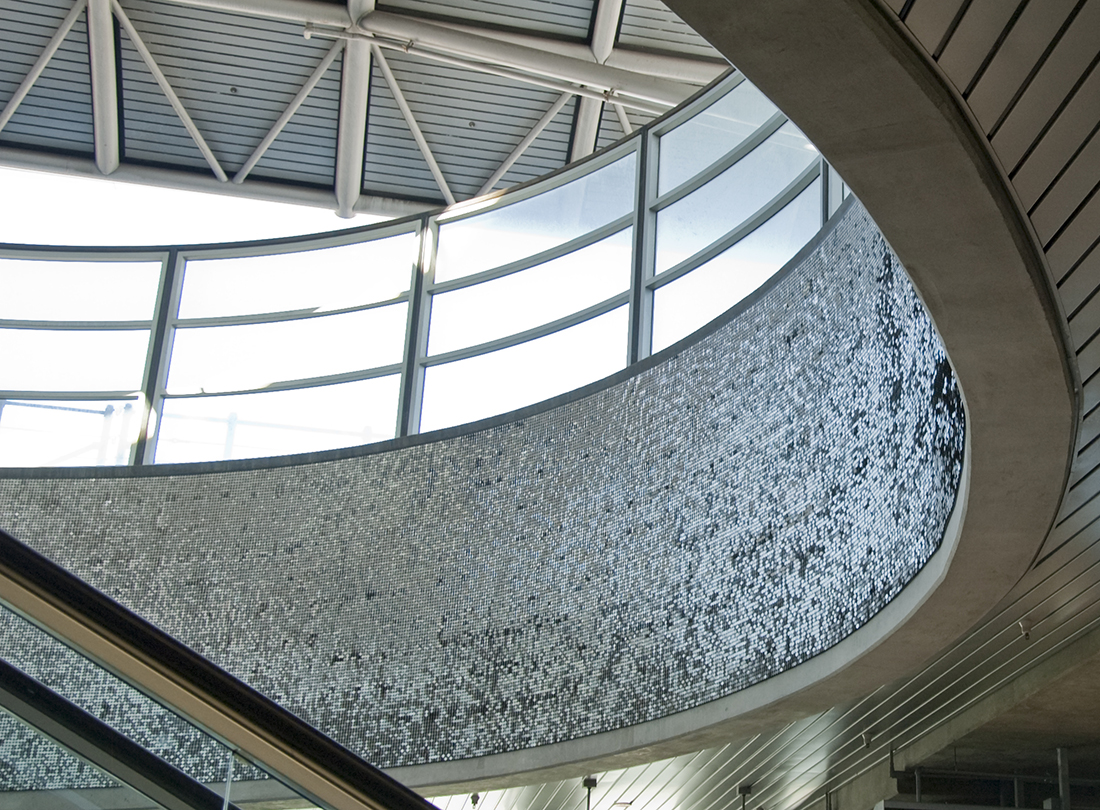
Wind Portal in 2009

Wind Portal is a 2003 artwork by Sebastopol artist Ned Kahn on the surface of the cylindrical opening in the floor separating the BART station from AirTrain. Passengers transferring between the two rail services ride escalators or walk on stairs through the opening, which measures 10 1/3 feet (3.1 m) high with a 16-foot (4.9 m) radius. The artwork consists of 200,000 stainless steel disks, each 1 inch (25 mm) in diameter and individually hung so they respond to air currents induced by train traffic. The work, along with others on the extension, was funded by a $1.5 million federal grant and other sources. John King, urban art critic for the San Francisco Chronicle, praised it, saying it was "[m]esmerizing ... an ever-changing silver shimmer ... indefinable movements reacting to distant winds as well as the whoosh of trains. The experience is hard to predict; there's a sense of anticipation."

== History ==
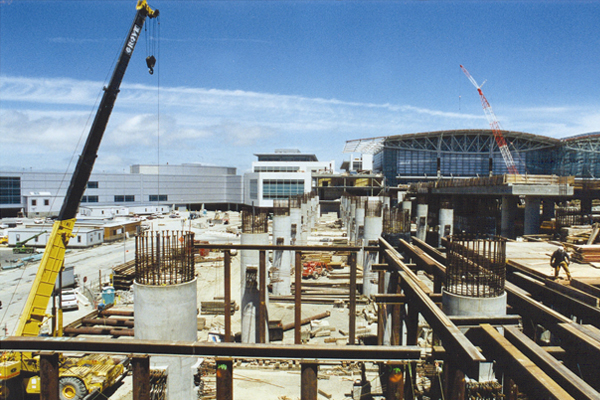
The station under construction in 1999

A BART extension to San Francisco International Airport was first proposed in 1970 - before the initial system even opened. In 1972, a "trace" — a concrete shell with space for a station — was built into the North Terminal (now Terminal 3) during its construction; it was blocked from use by later construction. Planning began in the early 1990s; after a great deal of political controversy over where the airport station would be located, construction began in 1997. The BART extension was constructed in concert with the International Terminal (which expanded the airport's capacity) and the AirTrain system (which connects the BART station to the other airport terminals). The San Francisco Airport Commission built the station for BART at a cost of $200 million, with BART paying $2.5 million in rent each year to use the station.

The AirTrain system opened on February 24, 2003, with BART service to SFIA station beginning on June 22, 2003. The station was initially served by the Blue Line, plus the Purple Line, a shuttle service to Caltrain connections at Millbrae station. The shuttle service was discontinued on February 9, 2004. The Yellow Line began serving SFIA station (as well as Millbrae on nights and weekends), with northbound trips on the Red Line also serving SFIA station at peak hours. Peak-hour Richmond line service began serving the station in both directions on September 13, 2004.

Within the first two weeks of service to SFIA station, ridership was 50% below the projected 6,500 passenger exits per day. BART service to stations in San Mateo County is funded by SamTrans, rather than county tax revenues. As ridership stayed below expectations, SamTrans had to pay a larger-than-planned operating subsidy to BART. On September 12, 2005, in order to lower these subsidies, BART reduced service so that only the Blue Line served SFIA and Millbrae stations. SamTrans and BART reached an agreement in February 2007 in which SamTrans would transfer control and financial responsibility of the SFO/Millbrae extension to BART, in return for BART receiving additional fixed funding from SamTrans and other sources.

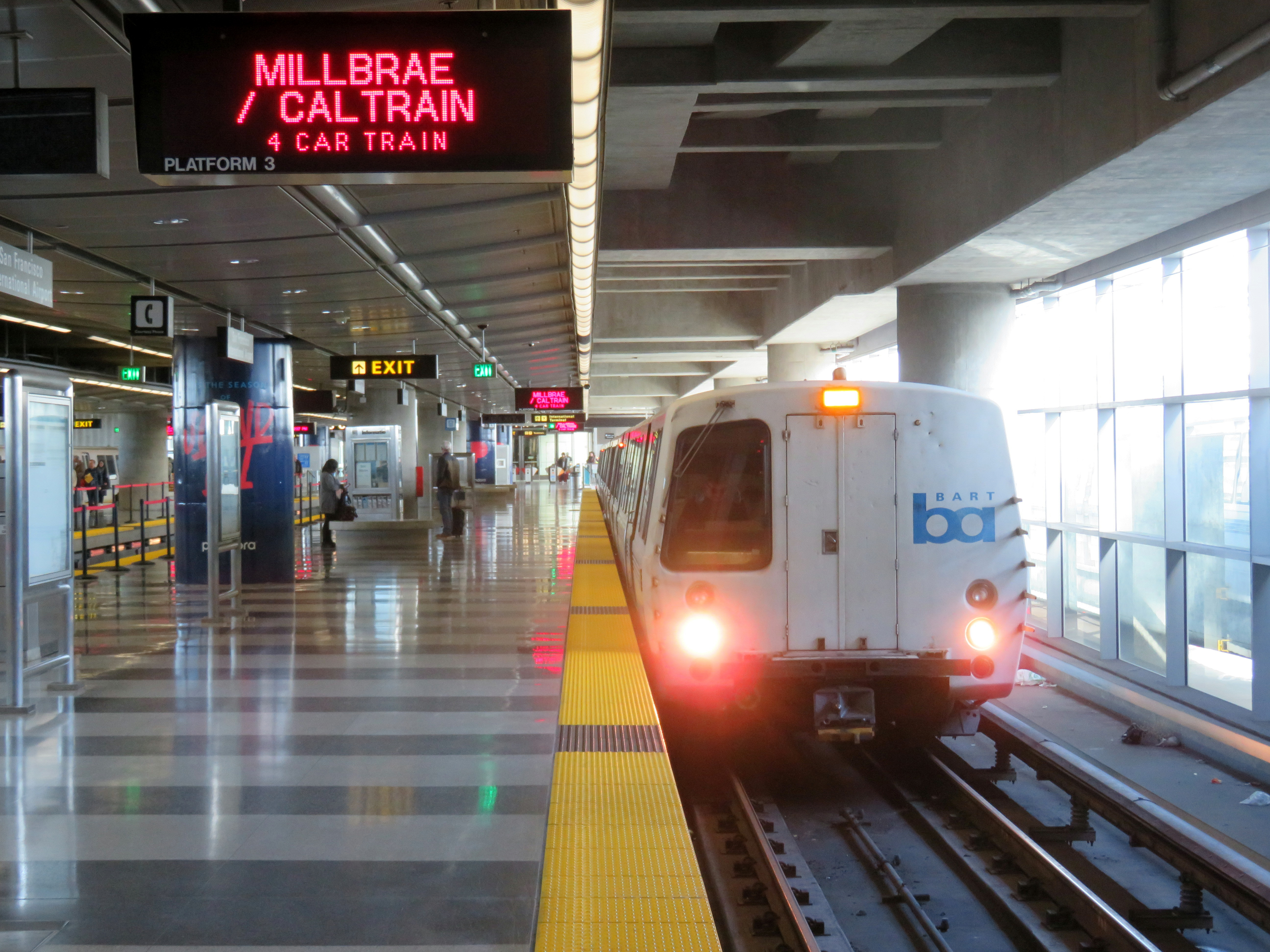
SFO–Millbrae line train at the station in 2019

On January 1, 2008, BART increased service to the San Mateo stations. SFIA became the terminus of the Yellow Line at all times, and direct service between SFIA and Millbrae was discontinued. On September 14, 2009, the line was extended to Millbrae on nights and weekends, restoring direct service at those times. During its first decade of service, ridership remained well below initial projections. Ridership has continued to increase, reaching a peak of 6,788 weekday exits in fiscal year 2016.

On February 11, 2019, Purple Line shuttle service resumed on weekdays and Sundays, with cross-platform connections to the Yellow Line at SFIA station. The Yellow Line continued to serve both SFIA and Millbrae on weeknights and Saturdays. On February 10, 2020, the Purple Line began running during all BART operating hours, with the Yellow Line terminating only at SFIA. In October 2019, the BART board approved development of technology for a proposed pilot program, under which BART and other public transit riders would have access to priority security screening lines at the airport.

SFO–Millbrae service ended on August 2, 2021; it was replaced by an extension of the Red Line to SFIA weekdays and Saturdays, and an extension of the Yellow Line to Millbrae evenings and Sundays. Richmond service began operating on Sundays effective February 14, 2022, providing 4 trains per hour at SFIA until 9 pm every day. In April 2022, the middle track was reopened, allowing the north platform to be used for all trains. The middle track is used for trains to Millbrae, while the north track is used for trains to San Bruno and points north. Installation of second-generation fare gates at the station took place from October 11–26, 2024.

On January 13, 2025, a shuttle train began operating between SFO and Millbrae between 9 pm and midnight due to the installation of Communications Based Train Control equipment near Millbrae. It is signed as part of the Yellow Line with timed cross-platform transfer offered at the station.
