= Quảng Yên =

Quảng Yên may refer to several places in Vietnam:

- Quảng Yên, Quảng Ninh, a ward of Quảng Ninh city
- Quảng Yên, Phú Thọ, a commune in Phú Thọ province
- Quảng Yên, Thanh Hóa, a commune in Thanh Hóa province
- Quảng Yên (town), a former district-level town of Quảng Ninh province
- Quang Yen coalfield, a large coal reserve in Quảng Ninh
