= Coal mining =

Process of getting coal to the surface

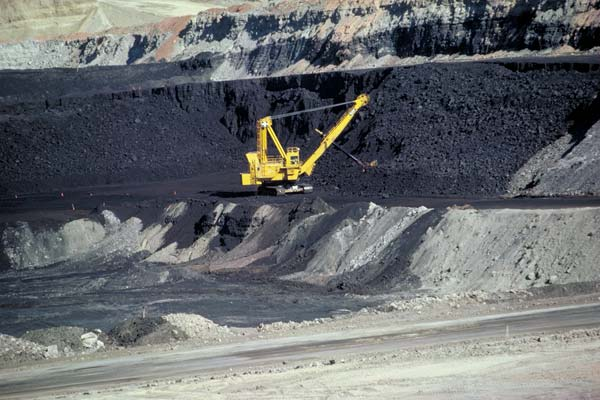
Surface coal mining in Wyoming, U.S.

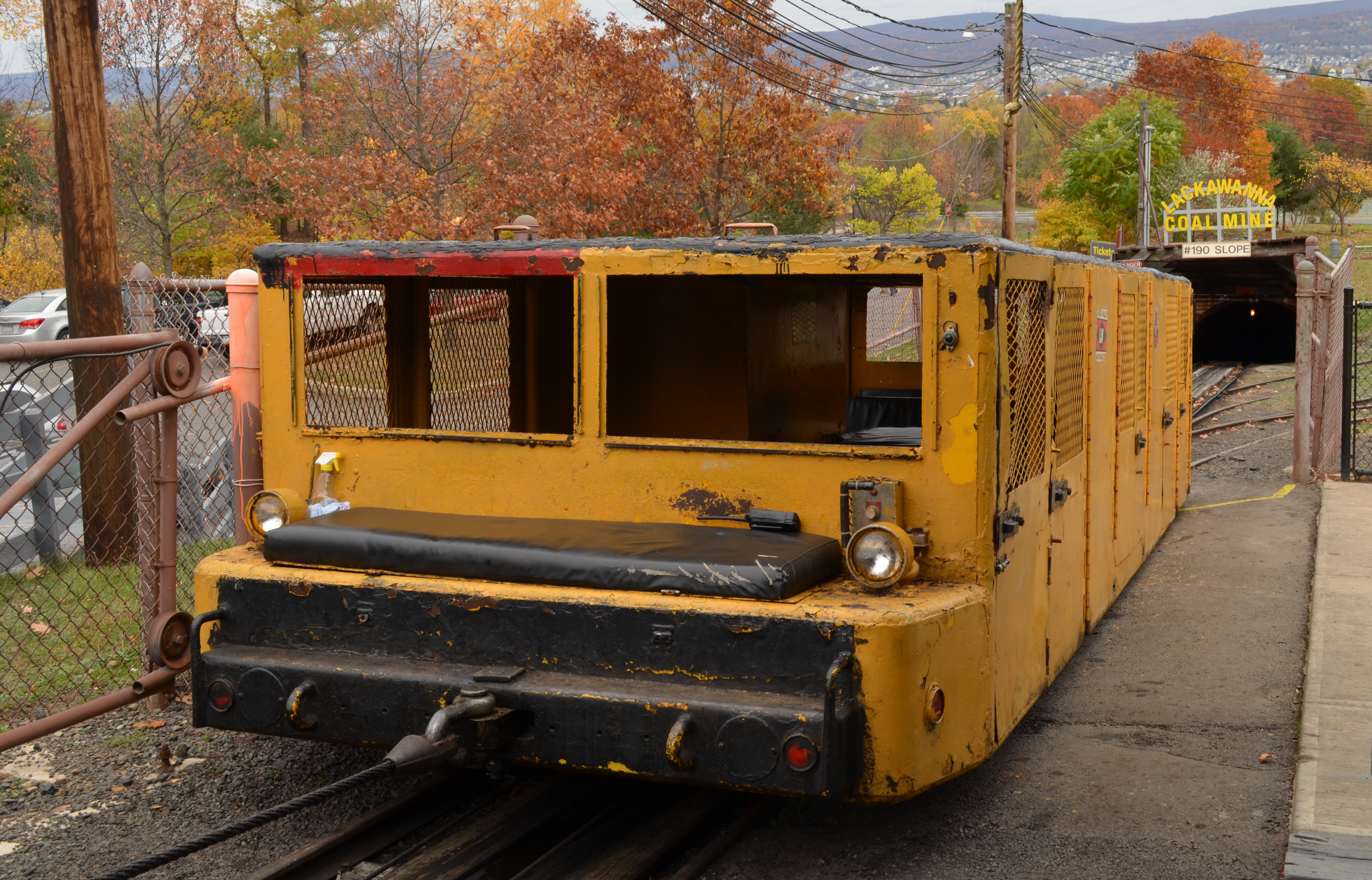
A coal mine mantrip at Lackawanna Coal Mine in Scranton, Pennsylvania

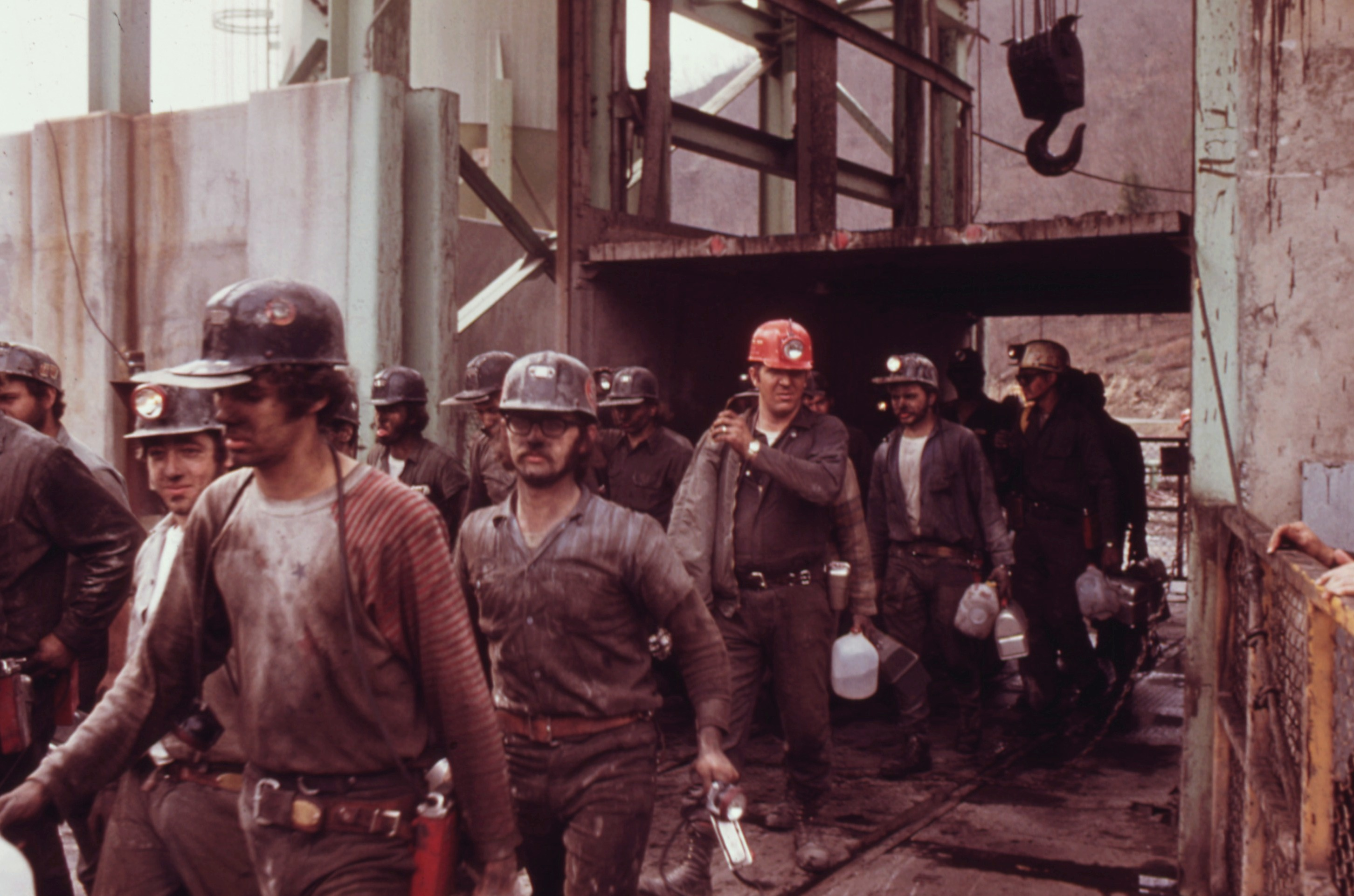
Coal miners exiting a winder cage at a mine near Richlands, Virginia in 1974

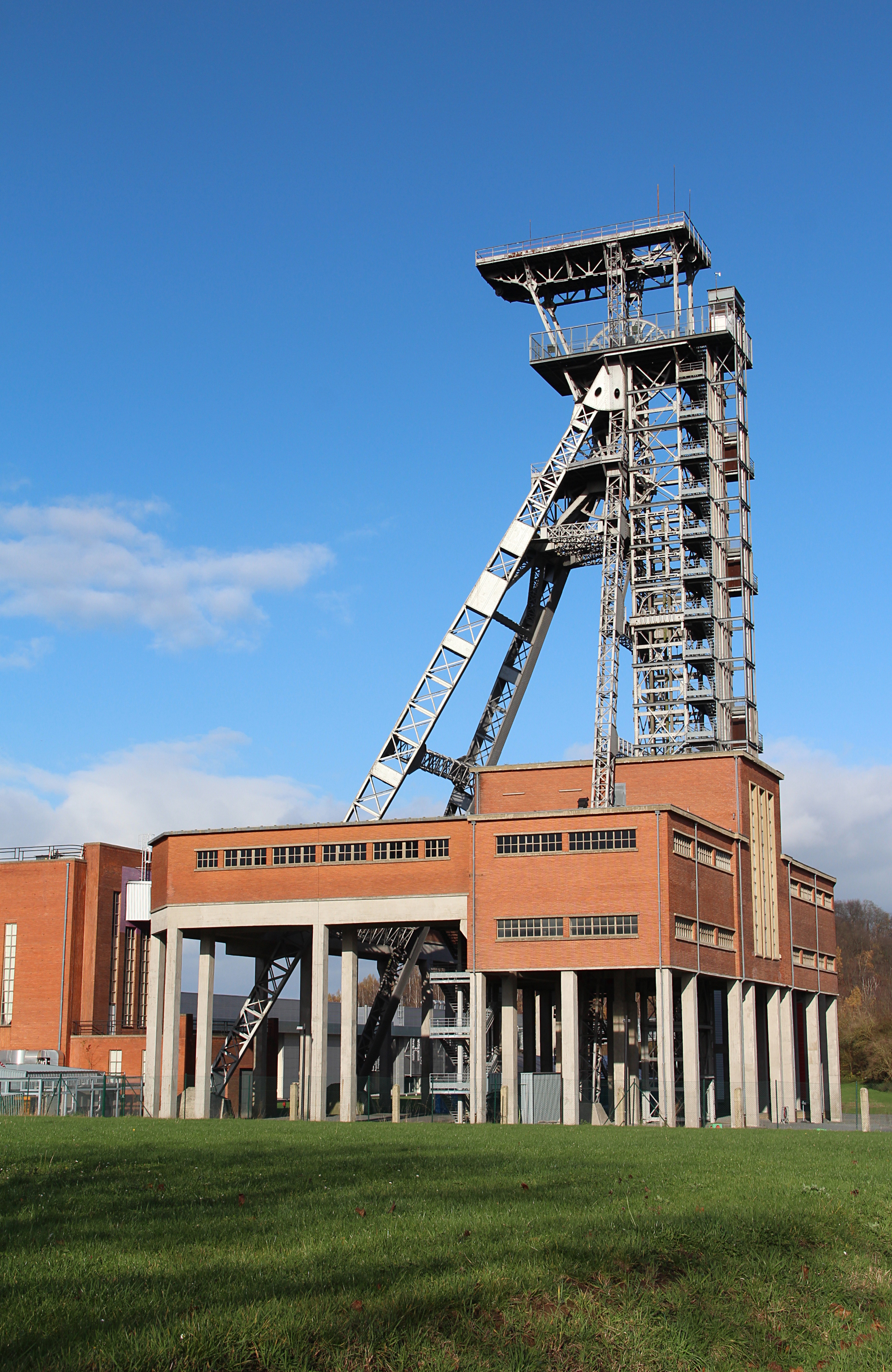
A coal mine in Frameries, Belgium

Coal mining is the process of extracting coal from the ground or from a mine. Coal is valued for its energy content and since the 1880s has been widely used to generate electricity. In the United Kingdom and South Africa, a coal mine and its structures are a colliery, a coal mine is called a pit, and above-ground mining structures are referred to as a pit head. In Australia, colliery generally refers to an underground coal mine.

Coal mining has had many developments in recent years, from the early days of tunneling, digging, and manually extracting the coal on carts to large open-cut and longwall mines. Mining at this scale requires the use of draglines, trucks, conveyors, hydraulic jacks, and shearers.

The coal mining industry has a long history of significant negative environmental impacts on local ecosystems, health impacts on local communities and workers, and contributes heavily to the global environmental crises, such as poor air quality and climate change. Coal mining can cause land degradation, polluted waterways and acid mine drainage, all of these contribute to environmental degradation. Studies show that coal mining is associated with large scale ecological degradation, with most affected land areas experiencing declining environmental quality. For these reasons, coal has been one of the first fossil fuels to be phased out of various parts of the global energy economy. The major coal producing countries, though, such as China, Indonesia, India and Australia, have not reached peak production, with production increases replacing falls in Europe and the United States and proposed mines under development.

As of 2023 the coal mining industry employed over 2.7 million workers, 2.2 million of them in Asia, but declines in global coal production were predicted to greatly decrease the number of coal jobs in coming decades.

== History ==
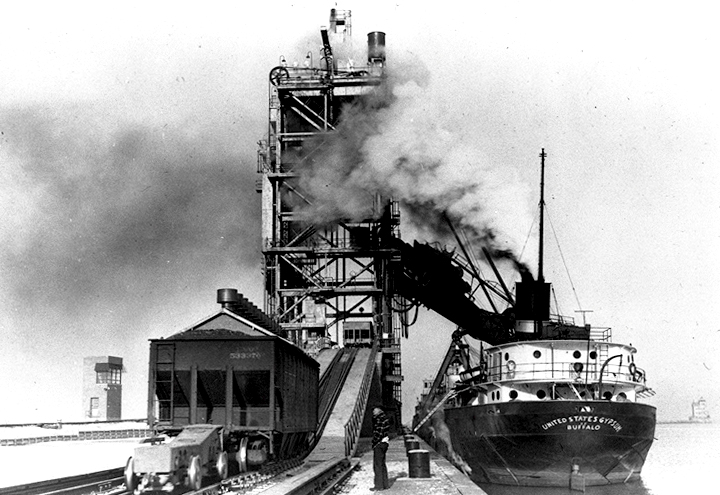
Ships have been used to haul coal since the Roman Empire

The history of coal mining goes back thousands of years, with early mines documented in ancient China, the Roman Empire and other early historical economies. It became important in the Industrial Revolution of the 18th and 19th centuries, when it was primarily used to power steam engines, heat buildings and generate electricity. Coal mining continues as an important economic activity today. Due to coal's strong contribution to global warming and environmental issues, coal is generally seen as a high impact fossil fuel. However, global demand consistently grows.

Compared to wood fuels, coal yields a higher amount of energy per unit mass (sometimes known as specific energy or massic energy) and can often be obtained in areas where wood is not readily available. Though it was used historically as a domestic fuel, coal is now used mostly in industry, especially in smelting and alloy production, as well as electricity generation. Large-scale coal mining developed during the Industrial Revolution, and coal provided the main source of primary energy for industry and transportation in industrial areas from the 18th century to the 1950s. Coal remains an important energy source. Coal is also mined today on a large scale by open pit methods wherever the coal strata strike the surface or are relatively shallow. Britain developed the main techniques of underground coal mining from the late 18th century onward, with further progress being driven by 19th-century and early 20th-century progress. However, oil and gas were increasingly used as alternatives from the 1860s onward.

By the late 20th century, coal was, for the most part, replaced in domestic as well as industrial and transportation usage by oil, natural gas or electricity produced from oil, gas, nuclear power or renewable energy sources. By 2010, coal produced over a fourth of the world's energy.

Since 1890, coal mining has also been a political and social issue. Coal miners' labour and trade unions became powerful in many countries in the 20th century, and often, the miners were leaders of the Left or Socialist movements (as in Britain, Germany, Poland, Japan, Chile, Canada and the U.S.) Since 1970, environmental issues have been increasingly important, including the health of miners, destruction of the landscape from strip mines and mountaintop removal, air pollution, and coal combustion's contribution to global warming.

== Methods of extraction ==
Technical and economic feasibility are evaluated based on the following: regional geological conditions; overburden characteristics; coal seam continuity, thickness, structure, quality, and depth; strength of materials above and below the seam for roof and floor conditions; topography, especially altitude and slope; climate; land ownership as it affects the availability of land for mining and access; surface drainage patterns; groundwater conditions; availability of labor and materials; coal purchaser requirements in terms of tonnage, quality, and destination; and capital investment requirements.

Surface mining and deep underground mining are the two basic methods of mining. The choice of mining method depends primarily on depth, density, overburden, and thickness of the coal seam; seams relatively close to the surface, at depths less than approximately 61 m (200 ft), are usually surface mined. Coal that occurs at depths of 55 to 90 m (180 to 300 ft) are usually deep mined, but in some cases surface mining techniques can be used. For example, some western U.S. coal that occur at depths in excess of 60 m (200 ft) are mined by the open pit methods, due to thickness of the seam 20–25 metres (60–90 feet). Coals occurring below 90 m (300 ft) are usually deep mined. However, there are open pit mining operations working on coal seams up to 300–460 metres (1,000–1,500 feet) below ground level, for instance Tagebau Hambach in Germany.

Coal extraction methods vary depending on whether the mine is an underground mine or a surface (also called an open cast) mine. The most economical method of coal extraction for surface mines is the electric shovel or drag line. The most economical form of underground mining is the long wall, which involves using two spinning drums with carbide bits that run along sections of the coal seam.

Many coals extracted from both surface and underground mines require washing in a coal preparation plant.

=== Surface mining ===
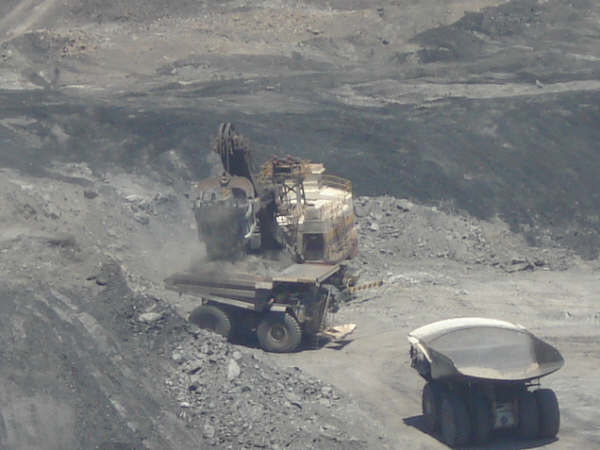
Trucks loaded with coal at the Cerrejón coal mine in Colombia

When coal seams are near the surface, it may be economical to extract the coal using open-cut, also referred to as open-cast, open-pit, mountaintop removal, or strip mining methods. Opencast coal mining recovers a greater proportion of the coal deposit than underground methods, as more of the coal seams in the strata may be exploited. Equipment can include the following: Draglines which operate by removing the overburden, power shovels, large trucks to transport overburden and coal, bucket wheel excavators, and conveyors. In this mining method, explosives are first used in order to break through the surface, or overburden, of the mining area. The overburden is then removed by draglines or by shovel and truck. Once the coal seam is exposed, it is drilled, fractured and thoroughly mined in strips. The coal is then loaded onto large trucks or conveyors for transport to either the coal preparation plant or directly to where it will be used.

Most open cast mines in the United States extract bituminous coal. In Canada, Australia, and South Africa, open cast mining is used for both thermal and metallurgical coals. In New South Wales open casting for steam coal and anthracite is practiced. Surface mining accounts for around 80 percent of production in Australia, while in the US it is used for about 67 percent of production. Globally, about 40 percent of coal production involves surface mining.

==== Strip mining ====
Strip mining exposes coal by removing earth above each coal seam. This earth to be removed is referred to as 'overburden' and is removed in long strips. The overburden from the first strip is deposited in an area outside the planned mining area and referred to as out-of-pit dumping. Overburden from subsequent strips is deposited in the void left from mining the coal and overburden from the previous strip. This is known as pit-dumping.

It is often necessary to fragment the overburden by use of explosives. This is accomplished by drilling holes into the overburden, filling the holes with explosives, and detonating the explosive. The overburden is then removed, using large earth-moving equipment, such as draglines, shovel and trucks, excavator and trucks, or bucket-wheels and conveyors. Equipment depends on geological conditions; for example, to remove overburden that is loose or unconsolidated, a bucket wheel excavator might be the most productive. When all the overburden is removed, the underlying coal seam will be exposed (a 'block' of coal). This block of coal may be drilled and blasted (if hard) or otherwise loaded onto trucks or conveyors for transport to the coal preparation (or wash) plant. Once this strip is empty of coal, the process is repeated with a new strip being created next to it. This method is most suitable for areas with flat terrain.

The life of some area mines may be more than 50 years.

==== Contour mining ====
The contour mining method consists of removing overburden from the seam in a pattern following the contours along a ridge or around the hillside. This method is most commonly used in areas with rolling to steep terrain. It was once common to deposit the spoil on the downslope side of the bench thus created, but this method of spoil disposal consumed much additional land and created severe landslide and erosion problems. To alleviate these problems, a variety of methods were devised to use freshly cut overburden to refill mined-out areas. These haul-back or lateral movement methods generally consist of an initial cut with the spoil deposited downslope or at some other site, and spoil from the second cut refilling the first. A ridge of undisturbed natural material 15 to 20 ft (5 to 6 m) wide is often intentionally left at the outer edge of the mined area. This barrier adds stability to the reclaimed slope by preventing spoil from slumping or sliding downhill. In certain contour mining operations, extracting multiple coal seams necessitates removing and managing interburden between layers, thereby increasing the complexity of the mining process. However, this still seems to be a common mining approach.

The limitations of contour strip mining are both economic and technical. When the operation reaches a predetermined stripping ratio (tons of overburden/tons of coal), it is not profitable to continue. Depending on the equipment available, it may not be technically feasible to exceed a certain height of highwall. At this point, it is possible to produce more coal with the augering method in which spiral drills bore tunnels into a highwall laterally from the bench to extract coal without removing the overburden.

==== Mountaintop removal mining ====
Mountaintop coal mining is a surface mining practice involving removal of mountaintops to expose coal seams, and disposing of associated mining overburden in adjacent "valley fills". Valley fills occur in steep terrain where there are limited disposal alternatives.

Mountaintop removal mining combines area and contour strip mining methods. In areas with rolling or steep terrain with a coal seam occurring near the top of a ridge or hill, the entire top is removed in a series of parallel cuts. Overburden is deposited in nearby valleys and hollows. This method usually leaves the ridge and hilltops as flattened plateaus. The process is highly controversial for the drastic changes in topography, the practice of creating head-of-hollow-fills, or filling in valleys with mining debris, and for covering streams and disrupting ecosystems.

Spoil is placed at the head of a narrow, steep-sided valley or hollow. In preparation for filling this area, vegetation and soil are removed and a rock drain constructed down the middle of the area to be filled, where a natural drainage course previously existed. When the fill is completed, this underdrain will form a continuous water runoff system from the upper end of the valley to the lower end of the fill. Typical head-of-hollow fills are graded and terraced to create permanently stable slopes.

=== Underground mining ===
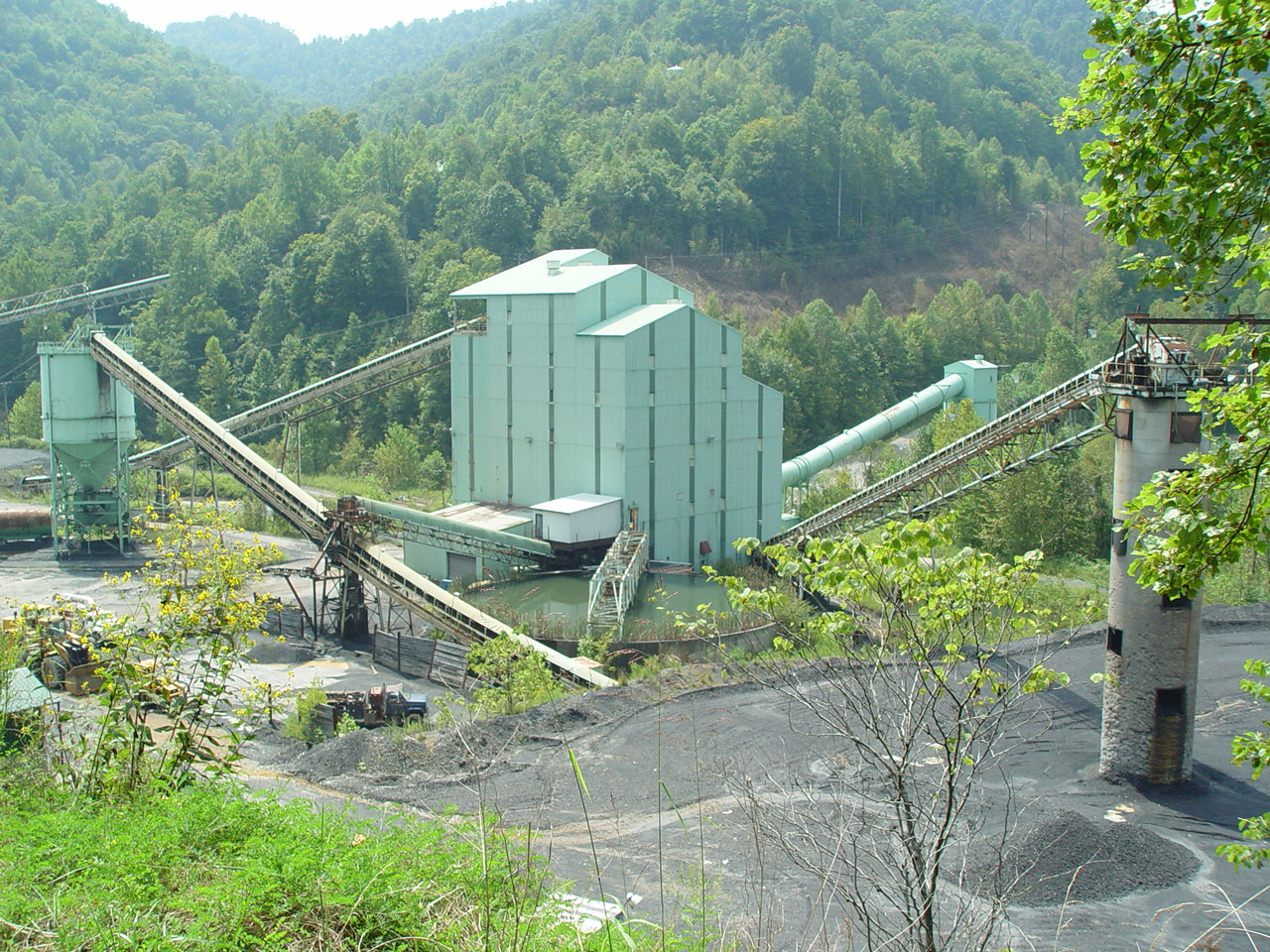
A coal wash plant in Clay County, Kentucky

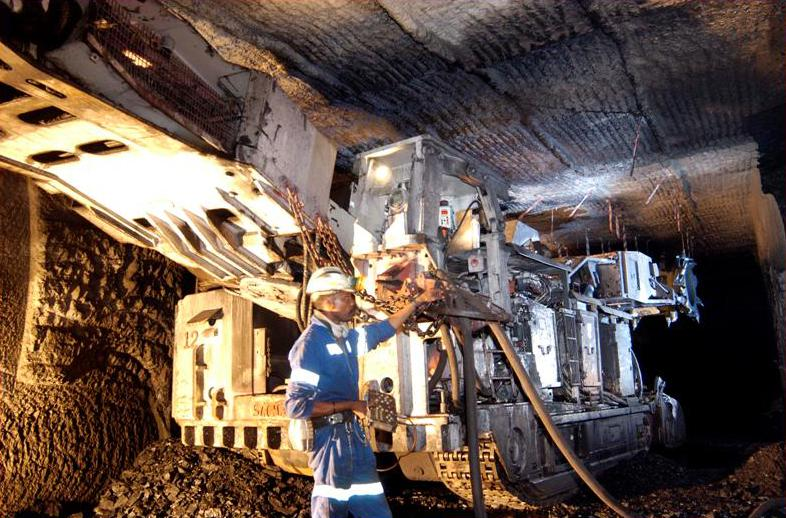
A remote Joy HM21 continuous miner used underground

Most coal seams are too deep underground for opencast mining and require underground mining, a method that currently accounts for about 60 percent of world coal production. In deep mining, the room and pillar or bord and pillar method progresses along the seam, while pillars and timber are left standing to support the mine roof. A work area involved in pillar extraction is called a pillar section. Once room and pillar mines have been developed to a stopping point limited by geology, ventilation, or economics, a supplementary version of room and pillar mining, termed second mining or retreat mining, is commonly started. Miners remove the coal in the pillars, thereby recovering as much coal from the coal seam as possible.

Modern pillar sections use remote-controlled equipment, including large hydraulic mobile roof-supports, which can prevent cave-ins until the miners and their equipment have left a work area. The mobile roof supports are similar to a large dining-room table, but with hydraulic jacks for legs. After the large pillars of coal have been mined away, the mobile roof support's legs shorten and it is withdrawn to a safe area. The mine roof typically collapses once the mobile roof supports leave an area.

There are six principal methods of underground mining:

- Longwall mining accounts for about 50 percent of underground production. The longwall shearer has a face of 1,000 feet (300 m) or more. It is a sophisticated machine with a rotating drum that moves mechanically back and forth across a wide coal seam. The loosened coal falls onto an armored chain conveyor or pan line that takes the coal to the conveyor belt for removal from the work area. Longwall systems have their own hydraulic roof supports which advance with the machine as mining progresses. As the longwall mining equipment moves forward, overlying rock that is no longer supported by coal is allowed to fall behind the operation in a controlled manner. The supports make possible high levels of production and safety. Sensors detect how much coal remains in the seam while robotic controls enhance efficiency. Longwall systems allow a 60-to-100 percent coal recovery rate when surrounding geology allows their use. Once the coal is removed, usually 75 percent of the section, the roof is allowed to collapse in a safe manner.
- Continuous mining utilizes a continuous miner machine with a large rotating steel drum equipped with tungsten carbide picks that scrape coal from the seam. Operating in a "room and pillar", also known as "bord and pillar" system, where the mine is divided into a series of 20-to-30-foot (5–10 m) "rooms" or work areas cut into the coalbed—it can mine as much as 14 tons of coal a minute, more than a non-mechanised mine of the 1920s would produce in an entire day. Continuous miners account for about 45 percent of underground coal production. Conveyors transport the removed coal from the seam. Remote-controlled continuous miners are used to work in a variety of difficult seams and conditions, and robotic versions controlled by computers are becoming increasingly common. Continuous mining is a misnomer, as room and pillar coal mining is very cyclical. In the US, one can generally cut up to around 20 feet (6 meters). This may be increased with MSHA permission. In South Africa, the limit may be as high as 12 metres (39 ft). After the cutting limit is reached, the continuous miner assembly is removed and the roof is supported by the use of a roof bolter, after which the face has to be serviced before it can be advanced again. During servicing, the "continuous" miner moves to another face. Some continuous miners can bolt and rock dust the face, two major components of servicing, while cutting coal, while a trained crew may be able to advance ventilation, to truly earn the "continuous" label. However, very few mines are able to achieve it. Most continuous mining machines in use in the US lack the ability to bolt and dust. This may partly be because the incorporation of bolting makes the machines wider, and therefore, less maneuverable.
- Room and pillar mining consists of coal deposits that are mined by cutting a network of rooms into the coal seam. Pillars of coal are left behind in order to keep up the roof. The pillars can make up to forty percent of the total coal in the seam, however, where there was space to leave the head and floor coal there is evidence from recent open cast excavations that 18th-century operators used a variety of room and pillar techniques to remove 92 percent of the in situ coal. However, this can be extracted at a later stage (see retreat mining).
- Blast mining or conventional mining, is an older practice that uses explosives such as dynamite to break up the coal seam, after which the coal is gathered and loaded onto shuttle cars or conveyors for removal to a central loading area. This process consists of a series of operations that begins with "cutting" the coalbed so it will break easily when blasted with explosives. This type of mining accounts for less than 5 percent of total underground production in the US today.
- Retreat mining is a method in which the pillars or coal ribs used to hold up the mine roof are extracted; allowing the mine roof to collapse as the mining works back towards the entrance. This is one of the most dangerous forms of mining, owing to imperfect predictability of when the roof will collapse and possibly crush or trap workers in the mine.

== Production ==
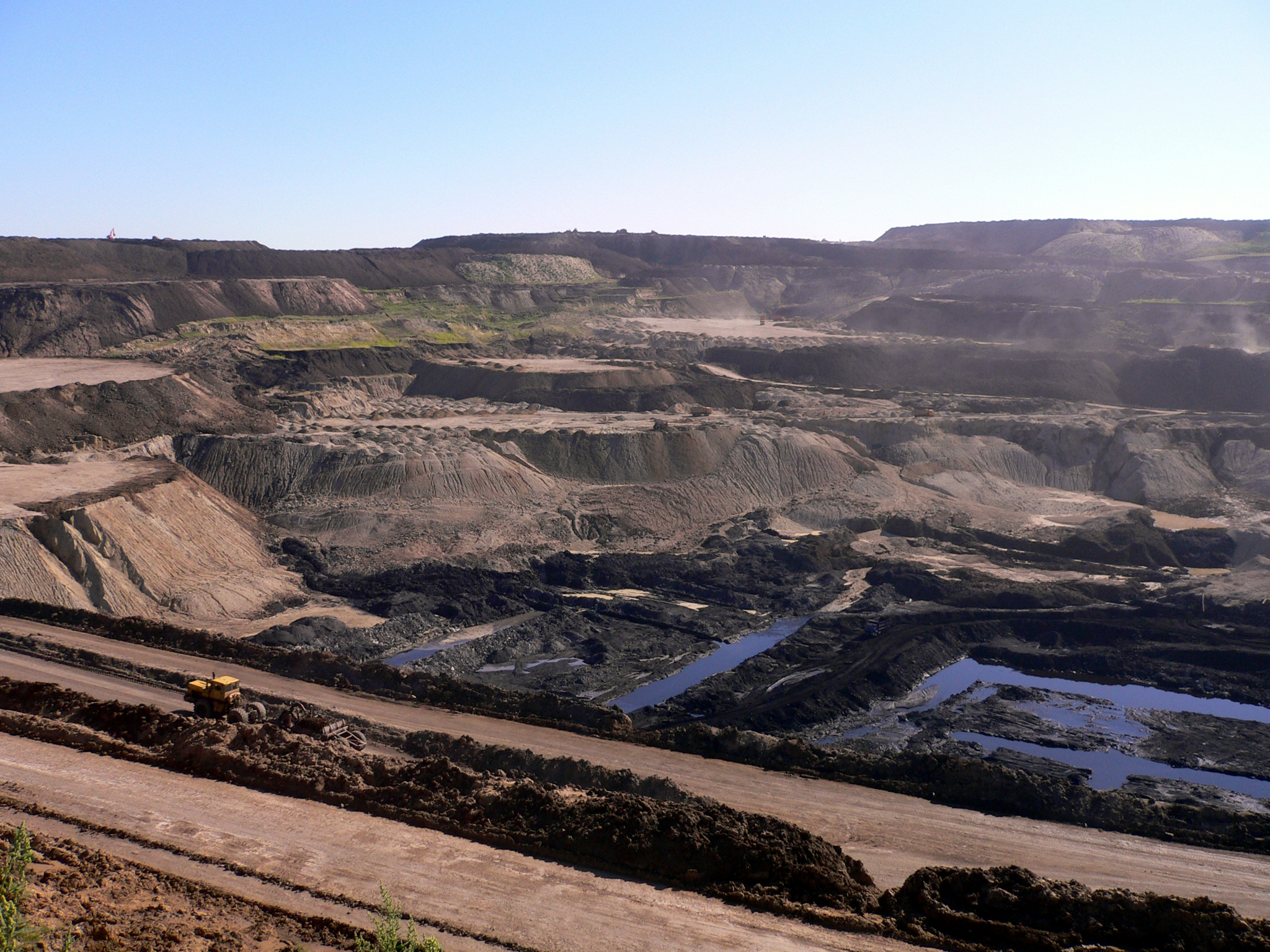
A lignite brown coal mine in Inner Mongolia, China

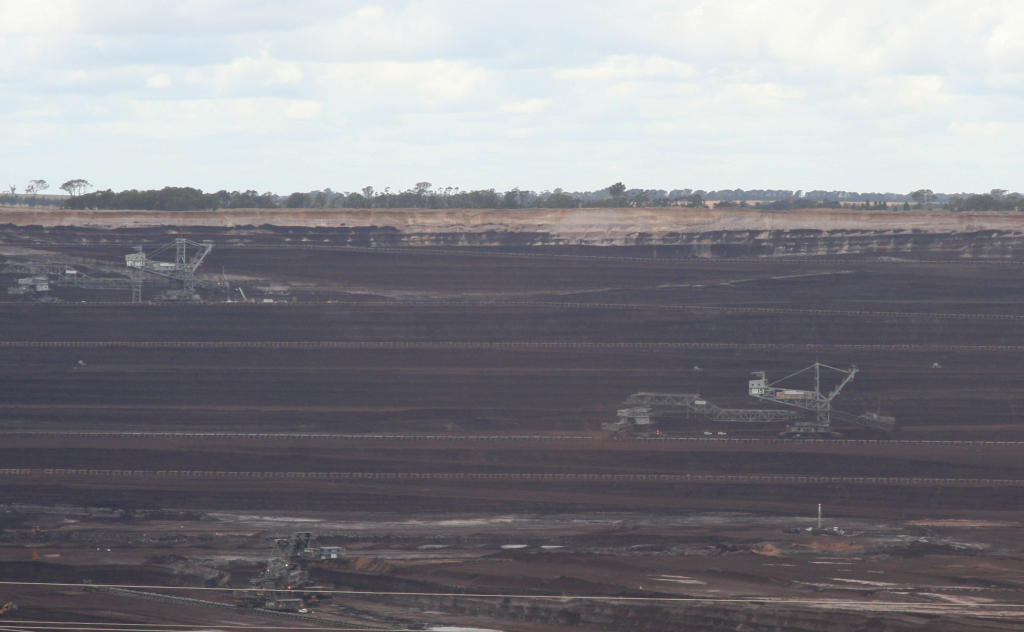
A lignite mine in Victoria, Australia

The historical coal production of various countries

Coal is mined commercially in over 50 countries. 7,921 million metric tons (Mt) of coal were produced in 2019, a 70% increase over the 20 years since 1999. In 2018, the world production of brown coal (lignite) was 803.2 Mt, with Germany the world's largest producer at 166.3 Mt. China is most likely the second largest producer and consumer of lignite globally although specific lignite production data is not made available.

Coal production has grown fastest in Asia, while Europe has declined. Since 2011, world coal production has been stable, with decreases in Europe and US offset by increases from China, Indonesia and Australia. The top coal mining nations are:

2019 estimate of total coal production
| Country | Production |
|---|---|
| China | 3,692 Mt |
| India | 745 Mt |
| United States | 640 Mt |
| Indonesia | 585 Mt |
| Australia | 500 Mt |
| Russia | 425 Mt |
| South Africa | 264 Mt |
| Germany | 132 Mt |
| Kazakhstan | 117 Mt |
| Poland | 112 Mt |

=== Economic impact ===
Energy production from coal mining is highly concentrated in certain jurisdictions, which also concentrates much of the social and economic impacts of the industry to these regions. The industry directly employs over seven million workers worldwide, which, in turn, creates millions of indirect jobs.

In several parts of the world, producers have reached peak coal as some economies shift away from fossil fuels to address climate change. A 2020 study found that renewables jobs could feasibly be created in these geographies to replace many of the coal mining jobs as part of a just transition; however, renewable energy was not suitable in some of the geographies with high concentrations of miners, such as in China, which is far and away the leading coal-mining nation.

2018 coal production, reserves, miners, and major coal-producing regions for China, India, the United States, and Australia, which account for approximately 70% of global annual coal production. The following table includes jurisdictions which are the top coal-producing provinces and states, responsible for over 85% of each country's coal production.
| Country | Coal production (million tonnes) | Coal reserves (million tonnes) | Coal miners (thousands) | Top producing provinces or states | % of national production covered |
| China | 3349 | 138,819 | 6110 | Shanxi, Shaanxi, Anhui, Heilongjiang, Xinjiang, Shandong, Henan, Guizhou | 90% |
| India | 717 | 97,728 | 485 | Chhattisgarh, Jharkhand, Orissa, Madhya Pradesh, Telangana | 85% |
| United States | 701 | 250,916 | 52 | Illinois, Indiana, Kentucky, Montana, North Dakota, Pennsylvania, Texas, West Virginia, and Wyoming | 90% |
| Australia | 478 | 144,818 | 50 | New South Wales, Queensland, Victoria, Australia | 99% |

=== Waste and refuse ===
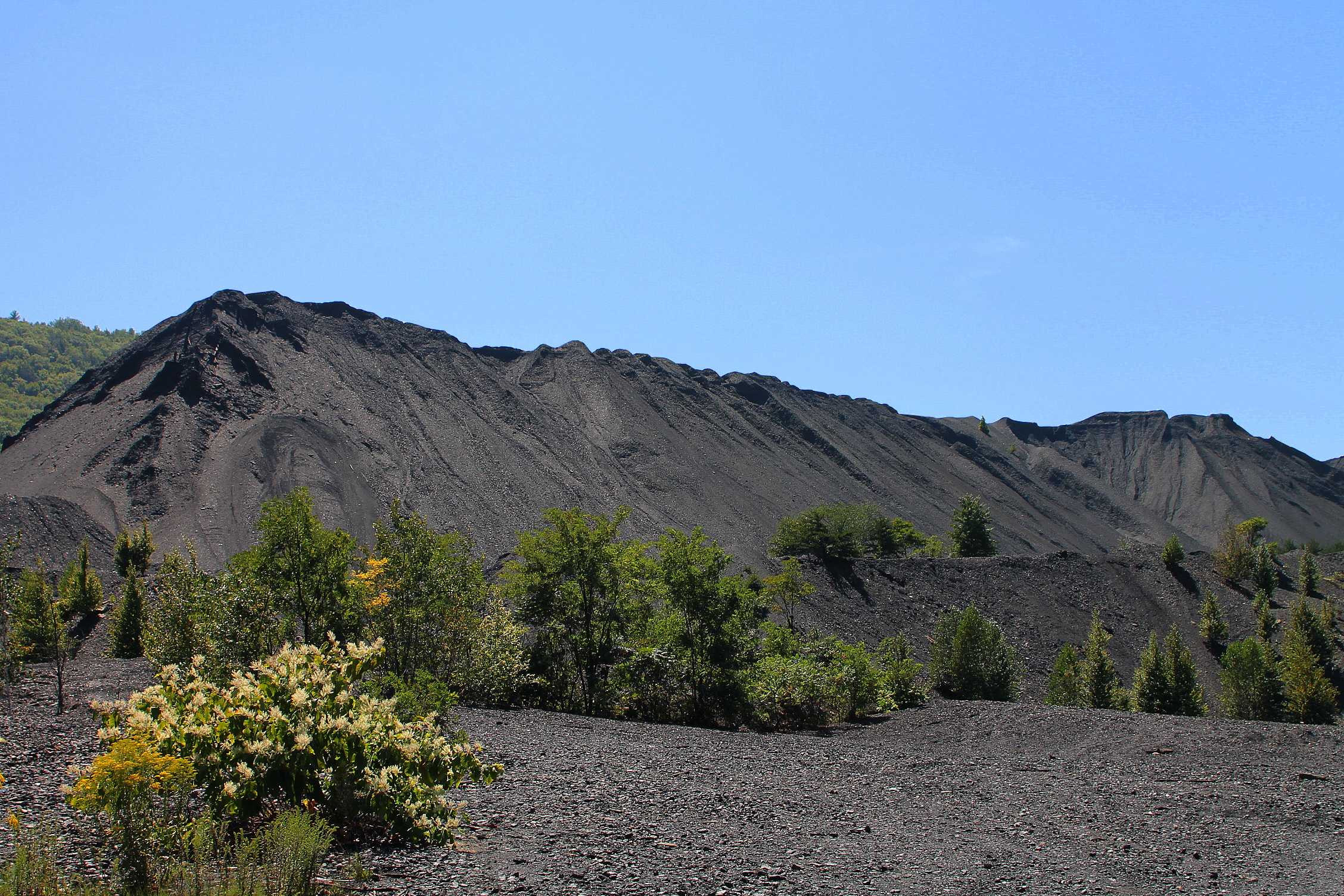
Coal waste in Pennsylvania

Coal refuse, also known as coal waste, rock, slag, coal tailings, waste material, rock bank, culm, boney, or gob, is the material left over from coal mining, usually as tailings piles or spoil tips. For every tonne of hard coal generated by mining, 400 kg (880 lb) of waste material remains, which includes some lost coal that is partially economically recoverable. Coal refuse is distinct from the byproducts of burning coal, such as fly ash.

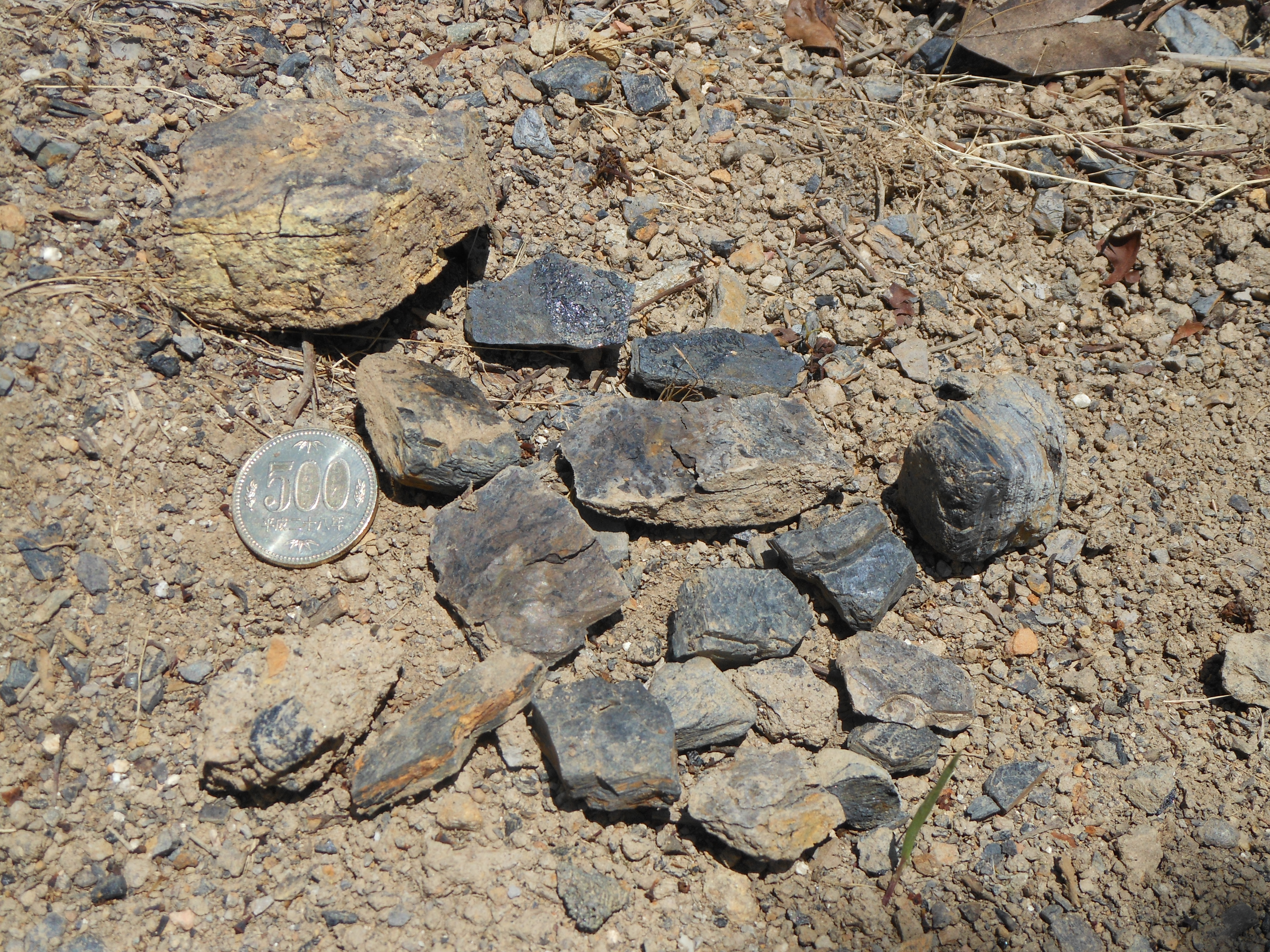
Coal spoil stones

Piles of coal refuse can have significant negative environmental consequences, including the leaching of iron, manganese, and aluminum residues into waterways and acid mine drainage. The runoff can create both surface and groundwater contamination. The piles also create a fire hazard, with the potential to spontaneously ignite. Because most coal refuse harbors toxic components, it is not easily reclaimed by replanting with plants like beach grasses.

Gob has about four times as much toxic mercury and more sulfur than typical coal. Culm is the term for waste anthracite coal.

==== Disasters ====
In the 1966 Aberfan disaster in Wales, a colliery spoil tip collapsed, engulfing a school and killing 116 children and 28 adults. Other accidents involving coal waste include the Martin County coal slurry spill (US, 2000), the Kingston Fossil Plant coal fly ash slurry spill (US, 2008), and the Obed Mountain coal mine spill (Canada, 2013).

== Modern mining ==
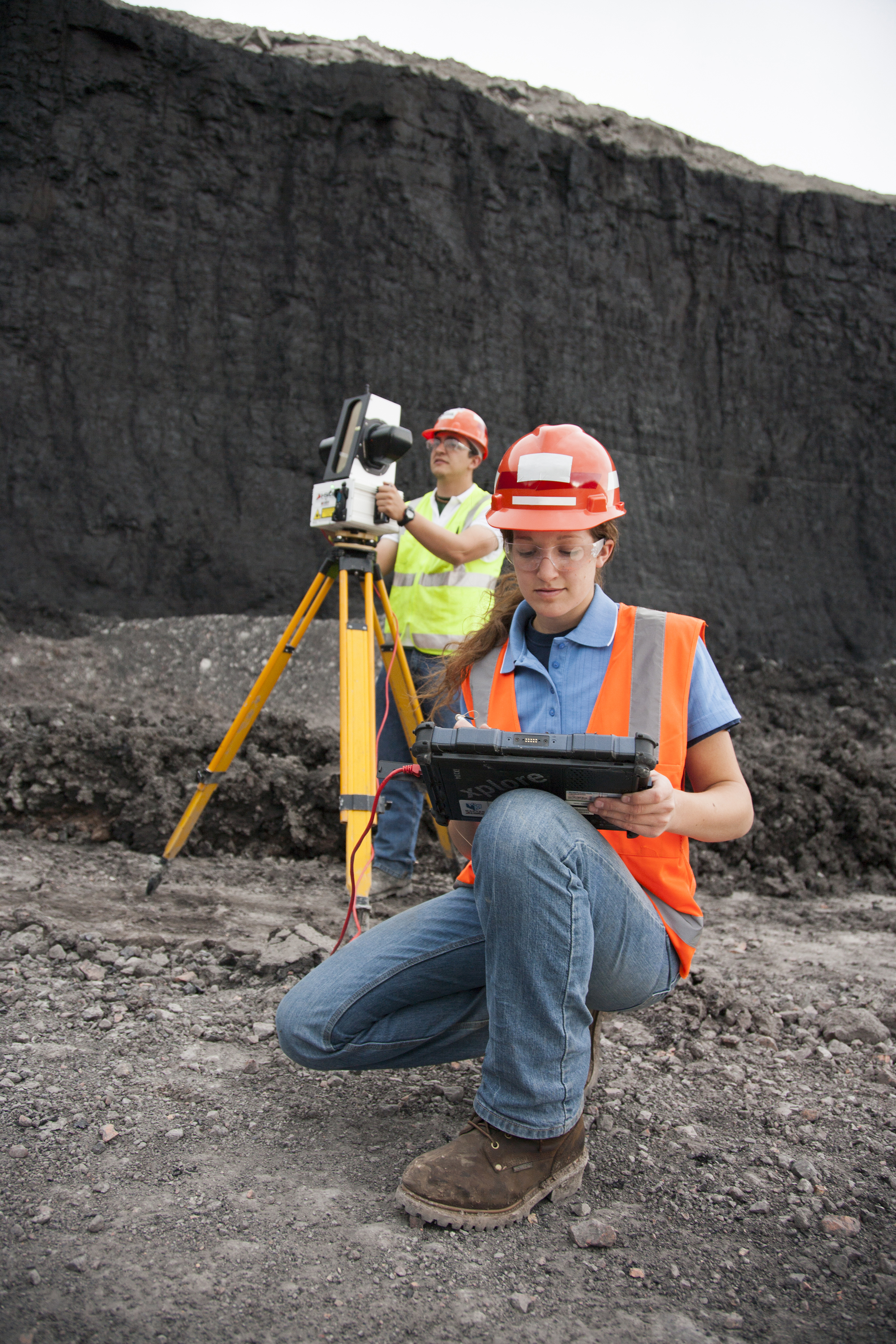
Laser profiling of a mine site by a coal miner using a Maptek I-site laser scanner in 2014

The use of sophisticated sensing equipment to monitor air quality is common and has replaced the use of small animals such as canaries, often referred to as "miner's canaries".

In the United States, the increase in technology has significantly decreased the mining workforce. in 2015 US coal mines had 65,971 employees, the lowest figure since EIA began collecting data in 1978. However, a 2016 study reported that a relatively minor investment would allow most coal workers to retrain for the solar energy industry.

== Safety ==
=== Dangers to miners ===
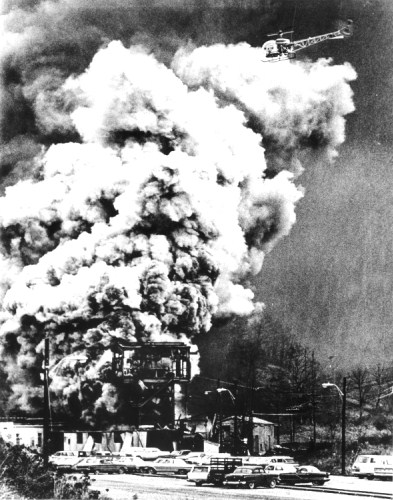
The Farmington Mine disaster, which killed 78 people in West Virginia in 1968

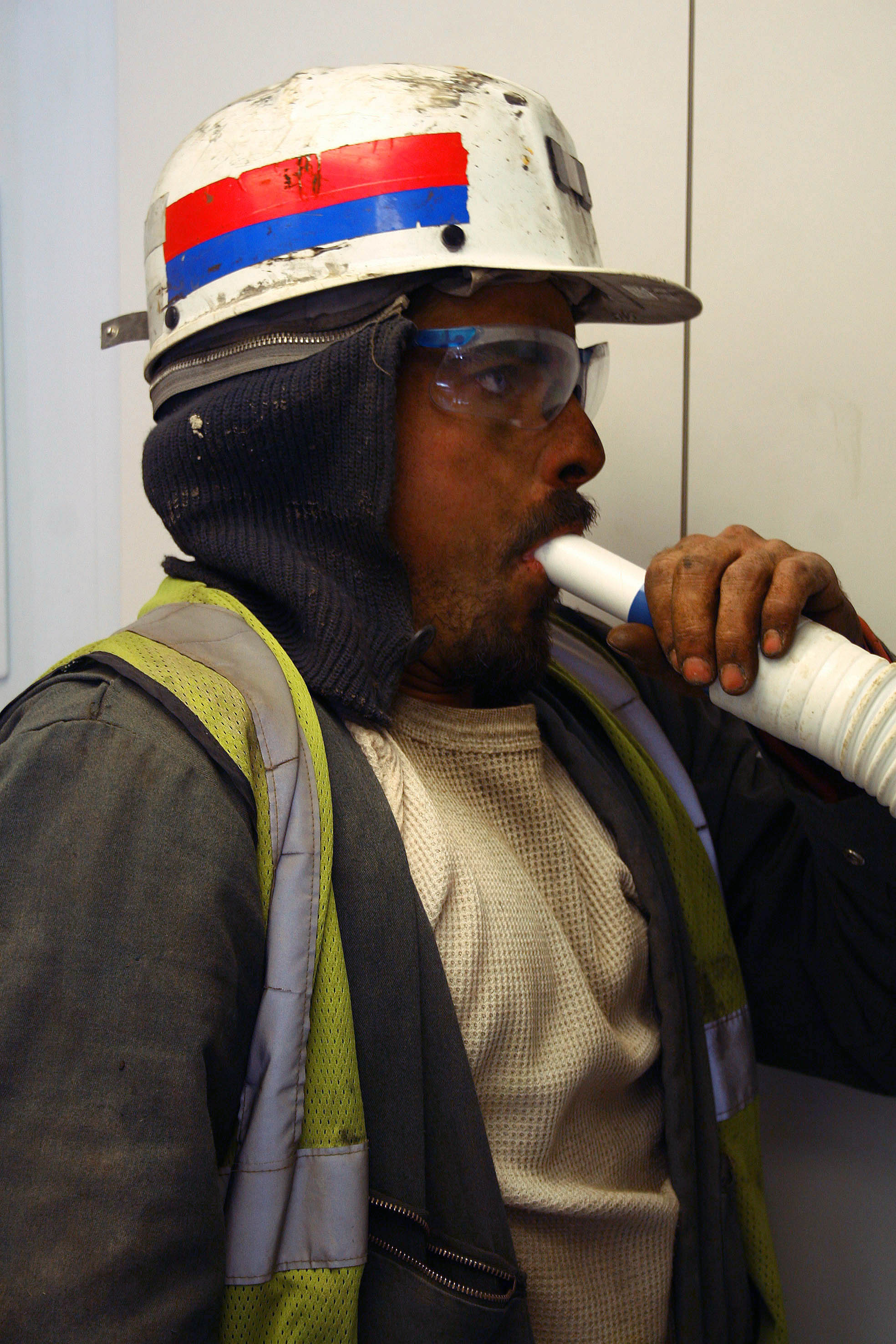
Miners can be regularly monitored for reduced lung function due to coal dust exposure using spirometry.

Coal mining has been a very dangerous activity and the list of historical coal mining disasters is long. In the U.S., 104,895 coal miners have been killed in mine accidents since 1900, 90 percent of the fatalities occurring in the first half of the 20th century. 3,242 died in 1907, the worst year ever; in 2020 there were five.

Open cut hazards are principally mine wall failures and vehicle collisions; underground mining hazards include suffocation, gas poisoning, roof collapse, rock burst, outbursts, and gas explosions.

Firedamp explosions can trigger the far more dangerous coal dust explosions, which can engulf an entire mine. Most of these risks are greatly reduced in modern mines, and multiple fatality incidents are now rare in most parts of the developed world. Modern coal mining in the US has an average 23 deaths per year due to mine accidents (2001–2020). However, in lesser developed countries and some developing countries, many miners continue to die annually, either through direct accidents in coal mines or through adverse health consequences from working under poor conditions. China, in particular, has the highest number of coal mining related deaths in the world, with official statistics claiming that 6,027 deaths occurred in 2004. To compare, 28 deaths were reported in the U.S. in the same year. Coal production in China is twice that in the US, while the number of coal miners is around 50 times that of the US, making deaths in coal mines in China 4 times as common per worker (108 times as common per unit output) as in the US.

Mine disasters have still occurred in recent years in the U.S., Examples include the Sago Mine disaster of 2006, and the 2007 mine accident in Utah's Crandall Canyon Mine, where nine miners were killed and six entombed. In the decade 2005–2014, US coal mining fatalities averaged 28 per year. The most fatalities during the 2005–2014 decade were 48 in 2010, the year of the Upper Big Branch Mine disaster in West Virginia, which killed 29 miners.

Increased surface coal mining activity has been linked to higher mortality rates from cardiovascular disease among mining workers along with nearby populations. Exposure to coal mining environments has been shown to affect immune function, renal health and even blood cells in mining site workers. Chronic lung diseases, such as pneumoconiosis (black lung) were once common in miners, leading to reduced life expectancy. In some mining countries black lung is still common, with 4,000 new cases of black lung every year in the US (4 percent of workers annually) and 10,000 new cases every year in China (0.2 percent of workers). The use of water sprays in mining equipment reduces the risk to miners' lungs.

==== Damps ====
Build-ups of a hazardous gas are known as damps, possibly from the German word Dampf which means steam or vapor:

- Black damp: a mixture of carbon dioxide and nitrogen in a mine can cause suffocation, and is formed as a result of corrosion in enclosed spaces that remove oxygen from the atmosphere.
- After damp: similar to black damp, after damp consists of carbon monoxide, carbon dioxide and nitrogen and forms after a mine explosion.
- Fire damp: consists of mostly methane, a highly flammable gas that explodes when its concentrations reach 5% to 15% – at 25% it causes asphyxiation.
- Stink damp: so named for the rotten egg smell of the hydrogen sulfide gas, stink damp can explode and is also very toxic.
- White damp: air containing carbon monoxide, which is toxic even at low concentrations.
- A heavy curtain used to direct air currents in mines and prevent the buildup of dangerous gases is known as a damp sheet.

==== Noise ====
Noise is also a contributing factor to potential adverse effects on coal miners' health. Exposure to excessive noise can lead to noise-induced hearing loss. Hearing loss developed as a result of occupational exposures is coined occupational hearing loss. To protect miners' hearing, the US Mine Safety and Health Administration's (MSHA) guidelines for noise place a Permissible Exposure Limit (PEL) for noise at 90 dBA time-weighted over 8 hours. A lower cutoff, 85 dBA, is set for a worker to fall into the MSHA Action Level which dictates that workers be placed into hearing conservation programs.

Noise exposures vary depending on the method of extraction. For example, a study has found that among surface coal mine operations, dragline equipment produced the loudest sound at a range of 88–112 dBA. Within longwall sections, stageloaders used to transport coal from the mining face and shearers used for extraction represent some of the highest noise exposures. Auxiliary fans (up to 120 dBA), continuous mining machines (up to 109 dBA), and roof bolters (up to 103 dBA) represent some of the noisiest equipment within continuous mining sections. Exposures to noise exceeding 90 dBA can lead to adverse effects on workers' hearing. The use of administrative controls and engineering controls can be used to reduce noise exposures.

=== Safety improvements ===
A video on the use of rock bolts and roof screens in underground mines

Improvements in mining methods (e.g. longwall mining), hazardous gas monitoring (such as safety-lamps or more modern electronic gas monitors), gas drainage, electrical equipment, and ventilation have reduced many of the risks of rock falls, explosions, and unhealthy air quality. Gases released during the mining process can be recovered to generate electricity and improve worker safety with gas engines. Another innovation in recent years is the use of closed circuit escape respirators, respirators that contain oxygen for situations where mine ventilation is compromised. Statistical analyses performed by the US Department of Labor's Mine Safety and Health Administration (MSHA) show that between 1990 and 2004, the industry cut the rate of injuries by more than half and fatalities by two-thirds. But according to the Bureau of Labor Statistics, even in 2006, mining remained the second most dangerous occupation in America, when measured by fatality rate. These numbers, however, include all mining activities, and oil and gas mining contribute to the majority of fatalities. Coal mining resulted in 47 fatalities that year. One study, though, has suggested that hazards of modern mining are now more accretive with workers facing long-term health impacts, such as sleep deprivation, that build up over time.

== Environmental impacts ==
Strip mining severely alters the landscape, which reduces the value of the natural environment in the surrounding land. The land surface is dedicated to mining activities until it can be reshaped and reclaimed. If mining is allowed, resident human populations must be resettled off the mine site; economic activities, such as agriculture or hunting and gathering food and medicinal plants are interrupted. What becomes of the land surface after mining is determined by the manner in which the mining is conducted. Usually reclamation of disturbed lands to a land use condition is not equal to the original use. Existing land uses (such as livestock grazing, crop and timber production) are temporarily eliminated in mining areas. High-value, intensive-land-use areas like urban and transportation systems are not usually affected by mining operations. If mineral values are sufficient, these improvements may be removed to an adjacent area.

Strip mining eliminates existing vegetation, destroys the genetic soil profile, displaces or destroys wildlife and habitat, alters current land uses, and to some extent permanently changes the general topography of the area mined. Adverse impacts on geological features of human interest may occur in a coal strip mine. Geomorphic and geophysical features and outstanding scenic resources may be sacrificed by indiscriminate mining. Paleontological, cultural, and other historic values may be endangered due to the disruptive activities of blasting, ripping, and excavating coal. Stripping of overburden eliminates and destroys archeological and historic features, unless they are removed beforehand.

The removal of vegetative cover and activities associated with the construction of haul roads, stockpiling of topsoil, displacement of overburden and hauling of soil and coal increase the quantity of dust around mining operations. Dust degrades air quality in the immediate area, has an adverse impact on vegetative life, and constitutes health and safety hazards for mine workers and nearby residents.

Surface mining disrupts virtually all aesthetic elements of the landscape. Alteration of land forms often imposes unfamiliar and discontinuous configurations. New linear patterns appear as material is extracted and waste piles are developed. Different colors and textures are exposed as vegetative cover is removed and overburden dumped to the side. Dust, vibration, and diesel exhaust odors are created (affecting sight, sound, and smell). Residents of local communities often find such impacts disturbing or unpleasant. In case of mountaintop removal, tops are removed from mountains or hills to expose thick coal seams underneath. The soil and rock removed is deposited in nearby valleys, hollows and depressions, resulting in blocked (and contaminated) waterways.

Removal of soil and rock overburden covering the coal resource may cause burial and loss of topsoil, exposes parent material, and creates large infertile wastelands. Soil disturbance and associated compaction result in conditions conducive to erosion. Soil removal from the area to be surface-mined alters or destroys many natural soil characteristics, and reduces its biodiversity and productivity for agriculture. Soil structure may be disturbed by pulverization or aggregate breakdown.

In response to negative land effects of coal mining and the abundance of abandoned mines in the US the federal government enacted the Surface Mining Control and Reclamation Act of 1977, which requires reclamation plans for future coal mining sites. These plans must be approved by federal or state authorities before mining begins.

== Coal mining by country ==
The six largest coal producing nations as of 2015, according to the U.S. Energy Information Agency

Top 10 hard and brown coal producers in 2012 were (in million metric tons): China 3,621, United States 922, India 629, Australia 432, Indonesia 410, Russia 351, South Africa 261, Germany 196, Poland 144, and Kazakhstan 122.

=== Argentina ===
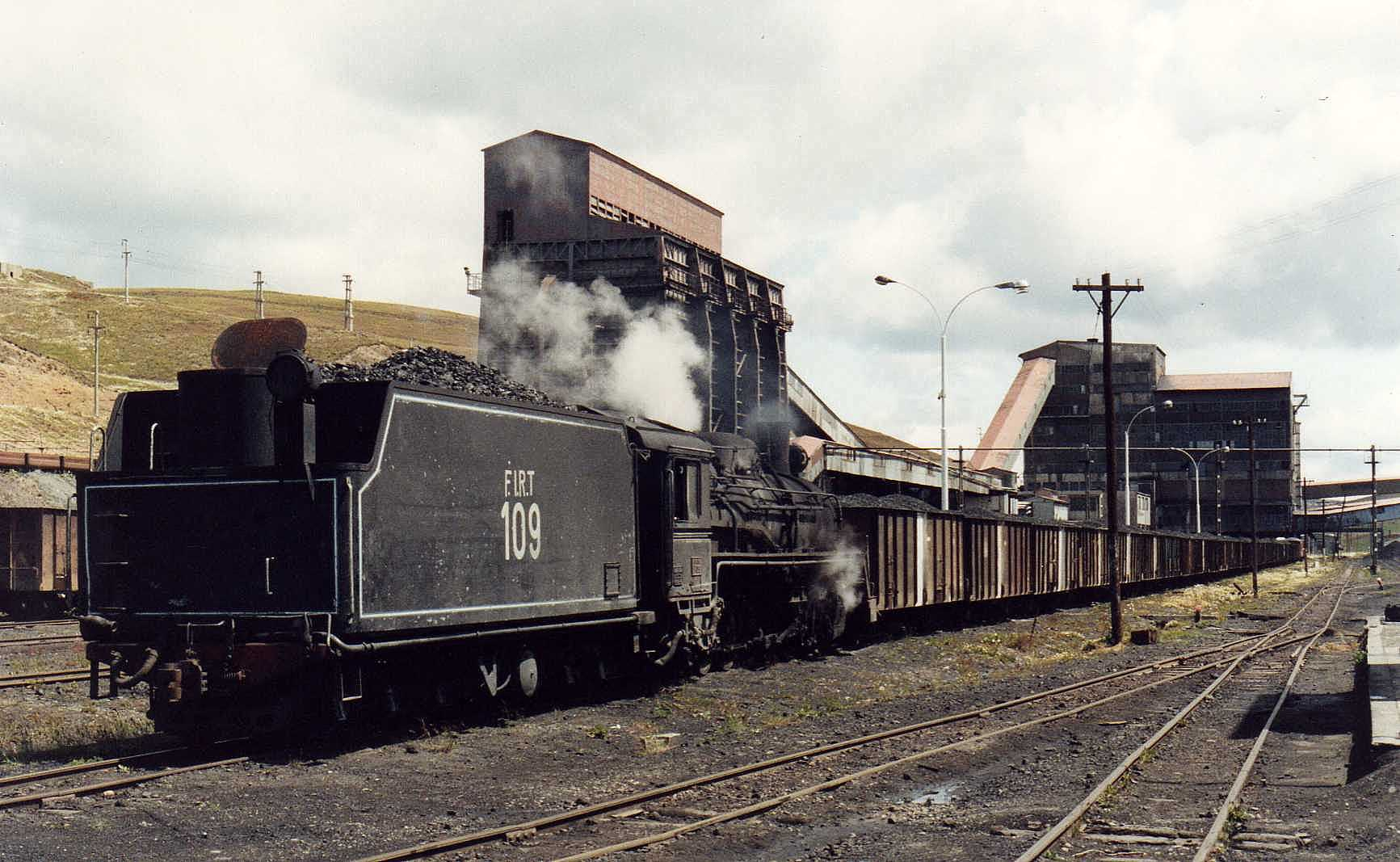
Coal train in Rio Turbio, Argentina

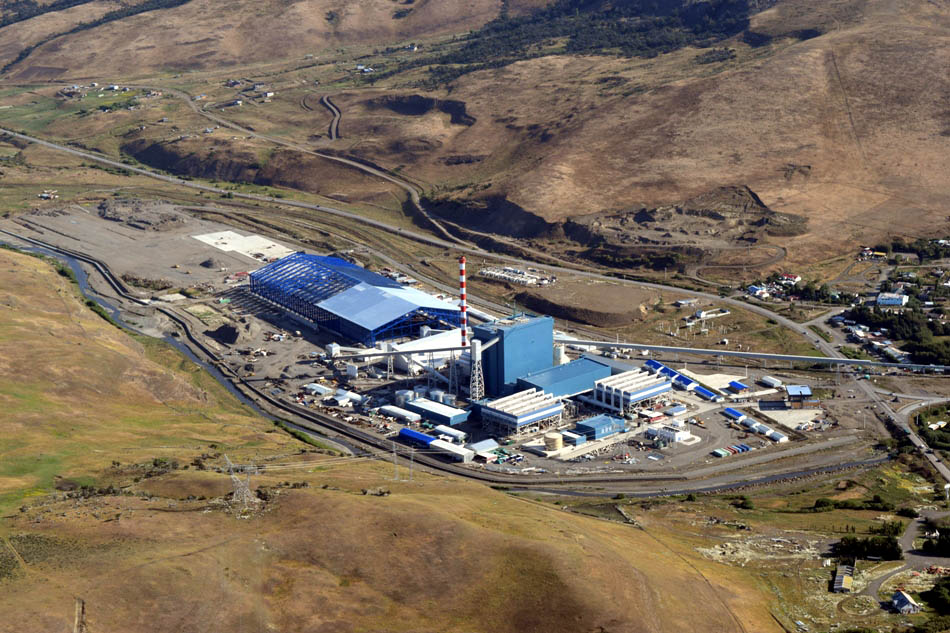
Rio Turbio Coal Mines, Santa Cruz Province, Argentina

In 1870, during Domingo Faustino Sarmiento's Presidency, the Law 448 was passed by the Argentine Congress, which had as its main goal to incentivize economically viable extraction in coal deposits. The reason behind the Argentine government's interest in coal was the expansion of the Argentine railways which during that time, was the world's second largest railway network.

A team led by Francisco Moreno discovered a coal deposit near Argentino lake, which was the biggest in Santa Cruz Province.

In 1936 the Dirección General de Yacimientos Petrolíferos started the exploration of those deposits while also searching for oil.

In 1941, due to World War II, the coal supply was threatened and the government of Roberto Ortiz decided to create the state-owned company Yacimientos Carboníferos Fiscales, and around 1943, the Rio Turbio coal mines started producing.

In 1993, President Carlos Menem privatized Yacimientos Carboníferos Río Turbio.

=== Australia ===
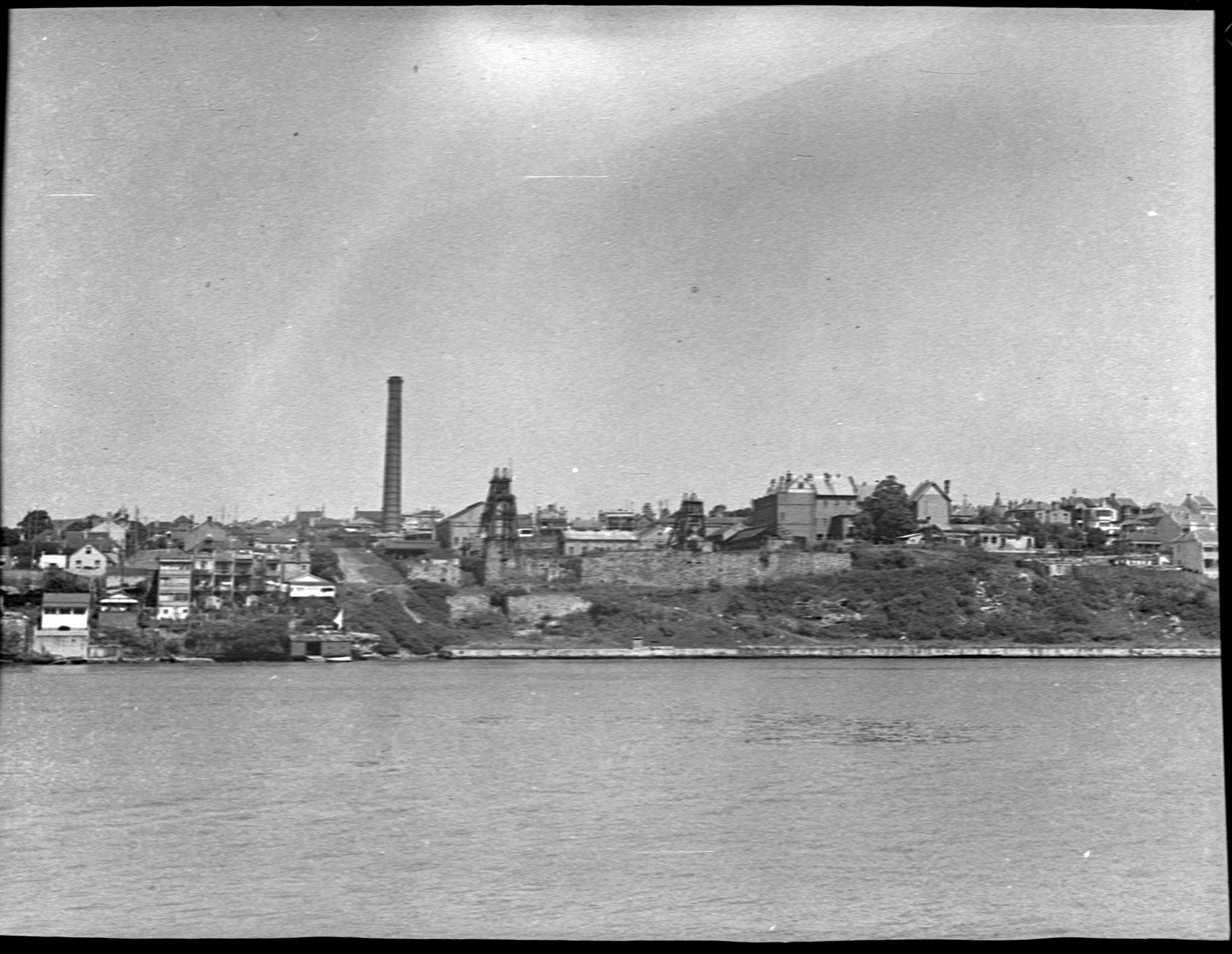
A Balmain coal mine in Sydney, Australia, in 1950

Coal has been mined in every state of Australia, but mainly in Queensland, New South Wales and Victoria. It is mostly used to generate electricity, and 75% of annual coal production is exported, mostly to eastern Asia.

In 2007, 428 million tonnes of coal was mined in Australia. In 2007, coal provided about 85% of Australia's electricity production. In the fiscal year 2008/09, 487 million tonnes of coal was mined, and 261 million tonnes was exported. In the fiscal year 2013/14, 430.9 million tonnes of coal was mined, and 375.1 million tonnes was exported. In 2013/14, coal provided about 69% of Australia's electricity production.

In 2013, Australia was the world's fifth-largest coal producer, after China, the United States, India, and Indonesia. However, in terms of proportion of production exported, Australia is the world's second largest coal exporter, as it exports roughly 73% of its coal production. Indonesia exports about 87% of its coal production.

A court in Australia has cited climate change in ruling against a new coal mine.

=== Canada ===
Canada was ranked as the 15th coal producing country in the world in 2010, with a total production of 67.9 million tonnes. Canada's coal reserves, the 12th largest in the world, are located largely in the province of Alberta.

The first coal mines in North America were located in Joggins and Port Morien, Nova Scotia, mined by French settlers beginning in the late 1600s. The coal was used for the British garrison at Annapolis Royal, and in the construction of the Fortress of Louisbourg.

=== Chile ===
Compared to other South American countries Chile has limited coal resources. Only Argentina is similarly poor. Coal in Chile is mostly sub-bituminous with the exception of the bituminous coals of the Arauco Basin in central Chile.

=== China ===
China is by far the largest producer of coal in the world, producing over 2.8 billion tons of coal in 2007, or approximately 39.8 percent of all coal produced in the world during that year. For comparison, the second largest producer, the United States, produced more than 1.1 billion tons in 2007. An estimated 5 million people work in China's coal-mining industry. As many as 20,000 miners die in accidents each year. Most Chinese mines are deep underground and do not produce the surface disruption typical of strip mines. Although there is some evidence of reclamation of mined land for use as parks, China does not require extensive reclamation and is creating significant acreages of abandoned mined land, which is unsuitable for agriculture or other human uses, and inhospitable to indigenous wildlife. Chinese underground mines often experience severe surface subsidence (6–12 meters), negatively impacting farmland because it no longer drains well. China uses some subsidence areas for aquaculture ponds but has more than they need for that purpose. Reclamation of subsided ground is a significant problem in China. Because most Chinese coal is for domestic consumption, and is burned with little or no air pollution control equipment, it contributes greatly to visible smoke and severe air pollution in industrial areas using coal for fuel. China's total energy uses 67% from coal mines.

=== Colombia ===
Some of the world's largest coal reserves are located in South America, and an opencast mine at Cerrejón in Colombia is one of the world's largest open pit mines. The output of the mine in 2004 was 24.9 million tons compared to total global hard coal production of 4,600 million tons. Cerrejón contributed about half of Colombia's coal exports of 52 million tons that year, with Colombia ranked sixth among major coal exporting nations. The company planned to expand production to 32 million tons by 2008. The company has its own 150 km standard-gauge railroad, connecting the mine to its coal-loading terminal at Puerto Bolívar on the Caribbean coast. There are two 120-car unit trains, each carrying 12,000 tons of coal per trip. The round-trip time for each train, including loading and unloading, is about 12 hours. The coal facilities at the port are capable of loading 4,800 tons per hour onto vessels of up to 175,000 tons of dead weight. The mine, railroad and port operate 24 hours per day. Cerrejón directly employs 4,600 workers, with a further 3,800 employed by contractors. The reserves at Cerrejón are low-sulfur, low-ash, bituminous coal. The coal is mostly used for electric power generation, with some also used in steel manufacture. The surface mineable reserves for the current contract are 330 million tons. However, total proven reserves to a depth of 300 metres are 3,000 million tons.

The expansion of the Cerrejón mine has been blamed for the forced displacement of local communities.

=== Germany ===
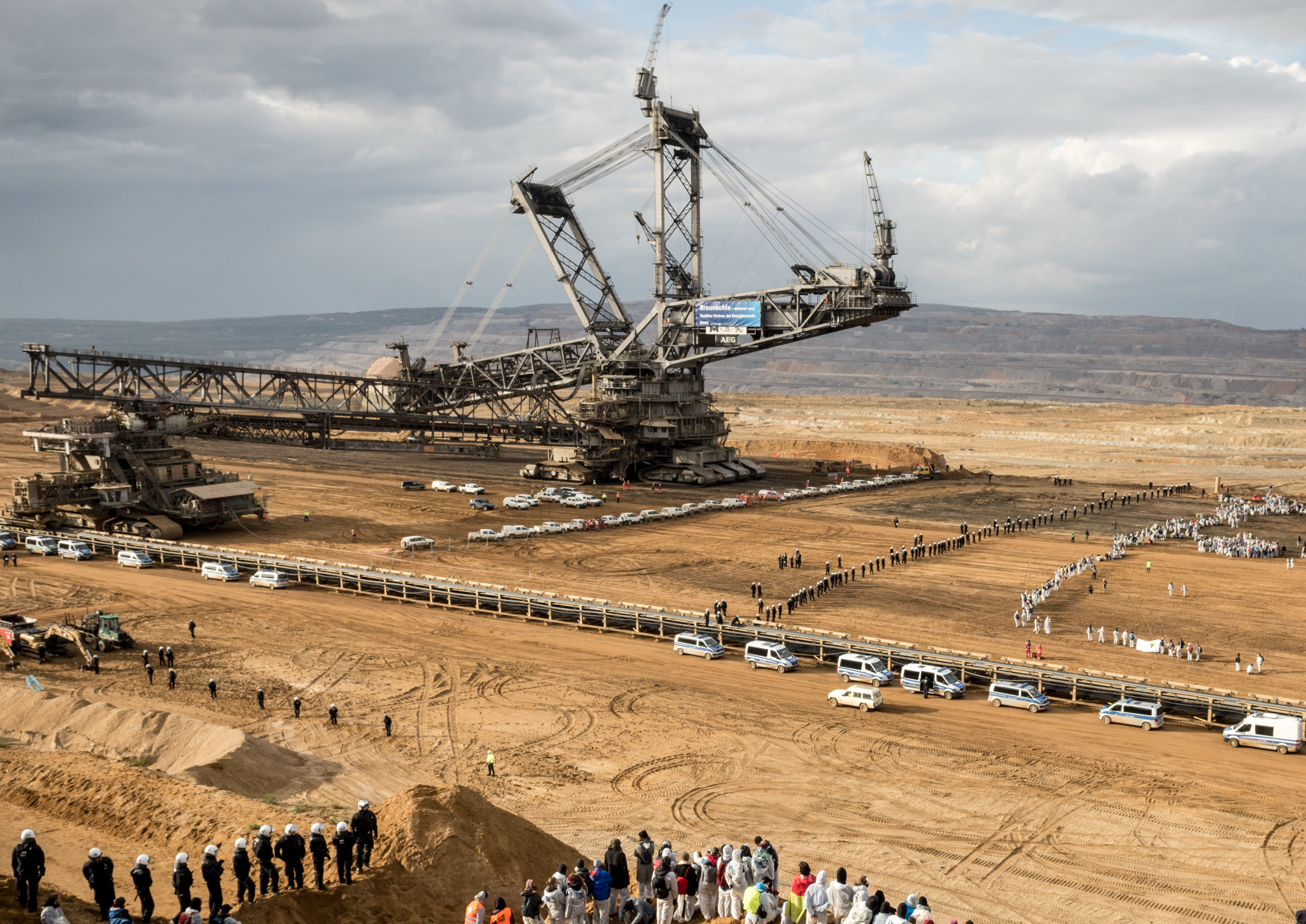
An open-pit coal mine in the Rhineland lignite mining area in Germany.

Germany has a long history of coal mining, going back to the Middle Ages. Coal mining greatly increased during the Industrial Revolution and the following decades. The main mining areas were around Aachen and the Ruhr area, along with many smaller areas in other parts of Germany, and until 1945 also in Upper Silesia, while the Saarland was repeatedly under French control. These areas grew and were shaped by coal mining and coal processing, and this is still visible even after the end of the coal mining.

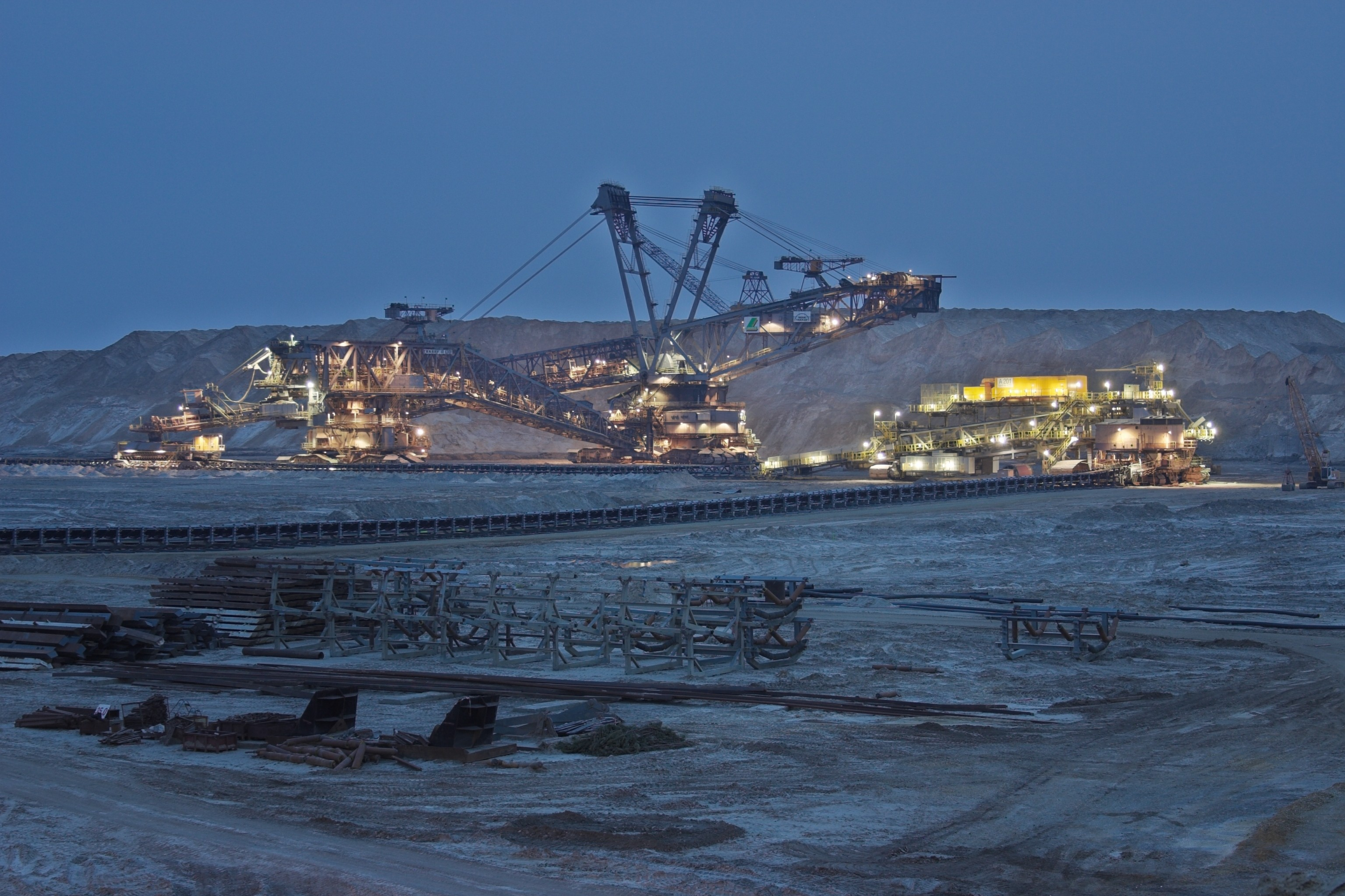
An excavator in the Welzow South open pit coal mine in Germany.

Coal mining reached its peak in the first half of the 20th century. After 1950, the coal producers started to struggle financially. In 1975, a subsidy was introduced (Kohlepfennig, coal penny as part of the electricity bill), which was discontinued in the 1990s. In 2007, due to EU regulations, the Bundestag decided to end subsidies by 2018. As a consequence, RAG AG, the owner of the two remaining coal mines in Germany, Prosper Haniel and Ibbenbüren, announced it would close all mines by 2018, thus ended underground coal mining in Germany.

Open pit lignite mining for electricity continues in Nordrhein-Westfalen, and in the eastern states of Brandenburg, Saxony and Saxony-Anhalt.

=== Greece ===
Lignite has been mined in Greece since 1873, and today supplies approximately 75% of the country's energy. The main mining areas are located in Western Macedonia (Ptolemaida) and the Peloponnese (Megalopolis).

=== India ===
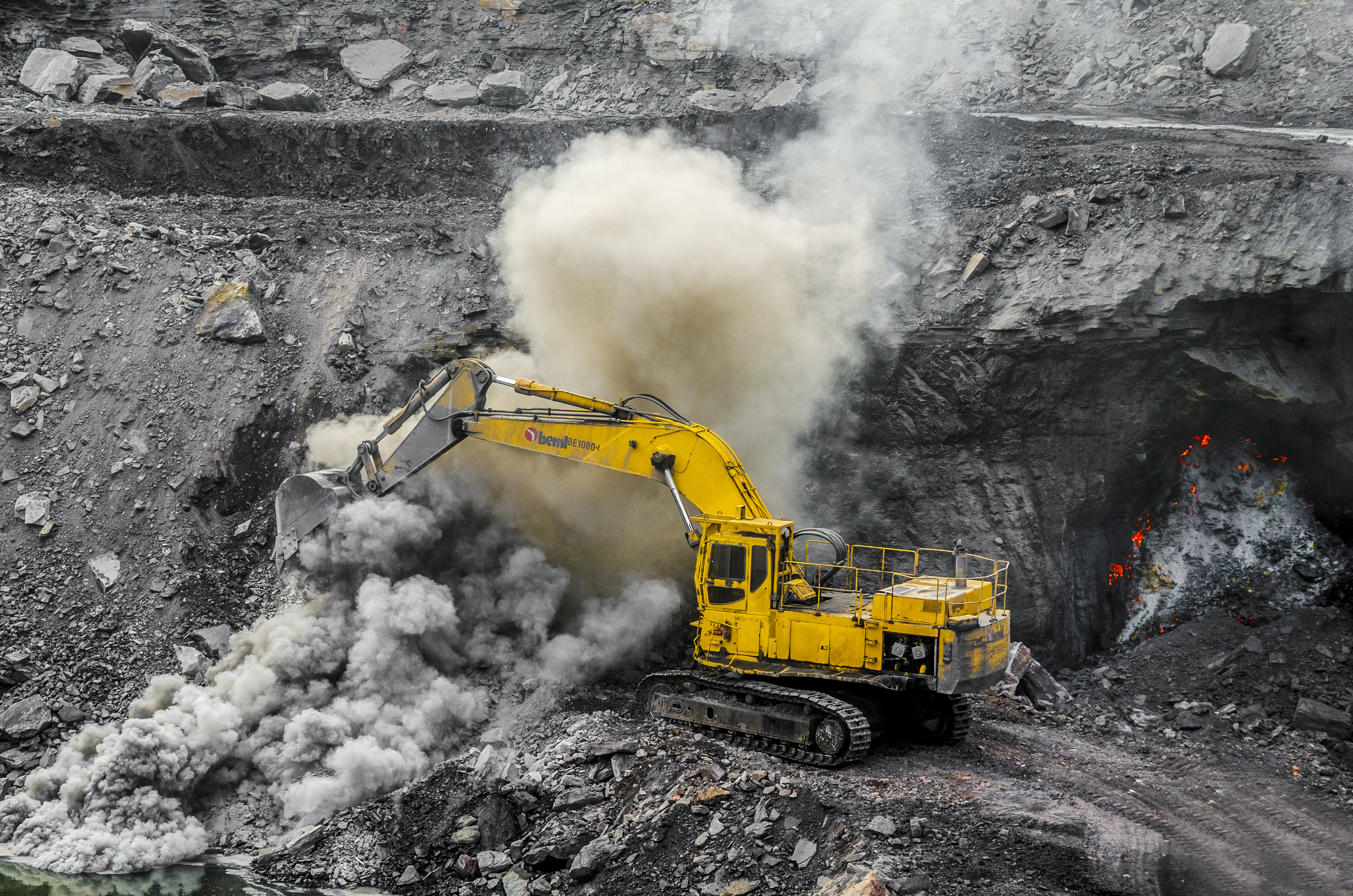
A coal mine in Jharia, India

Coal mining in India has a long history of commercial exploitation starting in 1774 with John Sumner and Suetonius Grant Heatly of the East India Company in the Raniganj Coalfield along the Western bank of Damodar River. Demand for coal remained low until the introduction of steam locomotives in 1853. After this, production rose to an annual average of 1 Mt and India produced 6.12 Mt per year by 1900 and 18 Mt per year by 1920, following increased demand in the First World War, but went through a slump in the early thirties. The production reached a level of 29 Mt by 1942 and 30 Mt by 1946. After independence, the country embarked upon five-year development plans. At the beginning of the 1st Plan, annual production went up to 33 Mt. During the 1st Plan period, the need for increasing coal production efficiently by systematic and scientific development of the coal industry was being felt. Setting up the National Coal Development Corporation (NCDC), a Government of India undertaking, in 1956 with the collieries owned by the railways as its nucleus was the first major step towards planned development of Indian Coal Industry. Along with the Singareni Collieries Company Ltd. (SCCL) which was already in operation since 1945 and which became a government company under the control of Government of Andhra Pradesh in 1956, India thus had two Government coal companies in the fifties. SCCL is now a joint undertaking of Government of Telangana and Government of India.

=== Japan ===
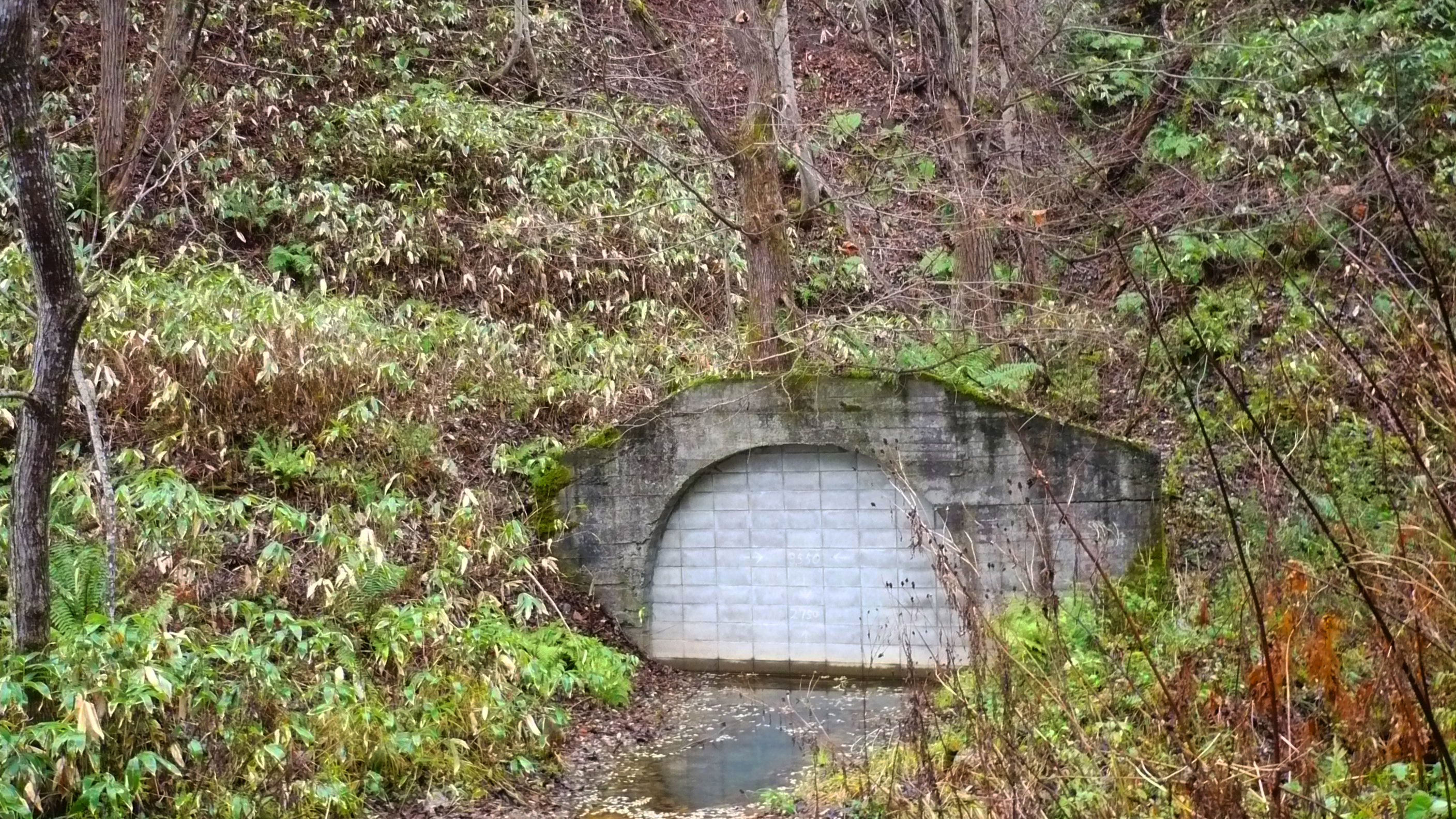
Daikōdō, the first adit of the Horonai mine, dug in 1879

The richest Japanese coal deposits have been found on Hokkaido and Kyushu.

Japan has a long history of coal mining dating back into the Japanese Middle Ages. It is said that coal was first discovered in 1469 by a farming couple near Ōmuta, central Kyushu. In 1478, farmers discovered burning stones in the north of the island, which led to the exploitation of the Chikuhõ coalfield.

Following Japanese industrialization, additional coalfields were discovered in northern Japan. One of the first mines in Hokkaido was the Hokutan Horonai coal mine.

=== New Zealand ===
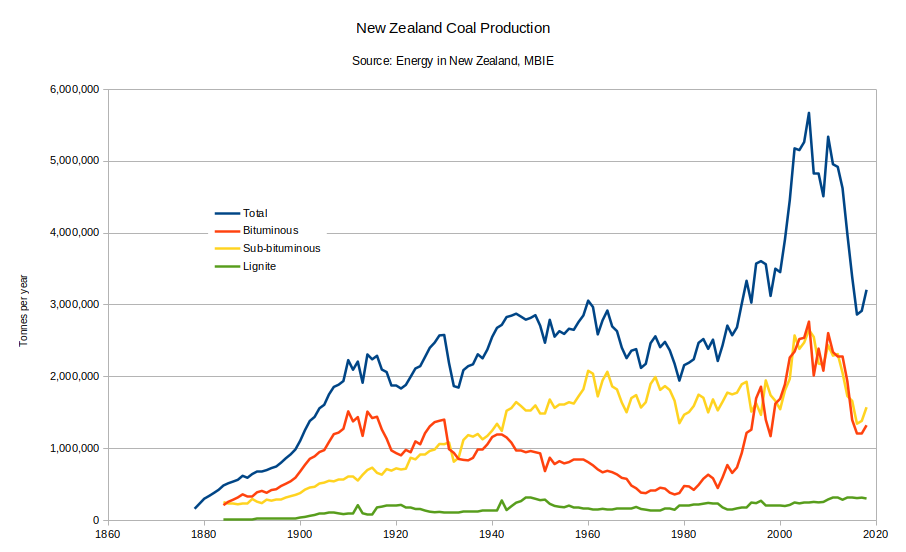
New Zealand Coal Production, 1878 – 2014

Coal mining produced almost 4 million tonnes of coal in 2014, of which 44% was exported. In 2016, it was down to 2,834,956 tonnes, very similar to production in 2020. New Zealand coal reserves are in excess of 15 billion tonnes, mainly in Waikato, Taranaki, West Coast, Otago, and Southland. Over 80% of the reserves are in Southland lignite deposits worth $100 billion. In 2008, coal was produced from four underground and 21 opencast mines. By the end of 2021, production was from 15 opencast mines, the largest being Stockton (see Environmental issues below), which produced 984,951 tonnes that year. The largest coal mining company was Solid Energy, a state-owned enterprise, until its collapse in 2015, but is now Bathurst Resources.

=== Poland ===
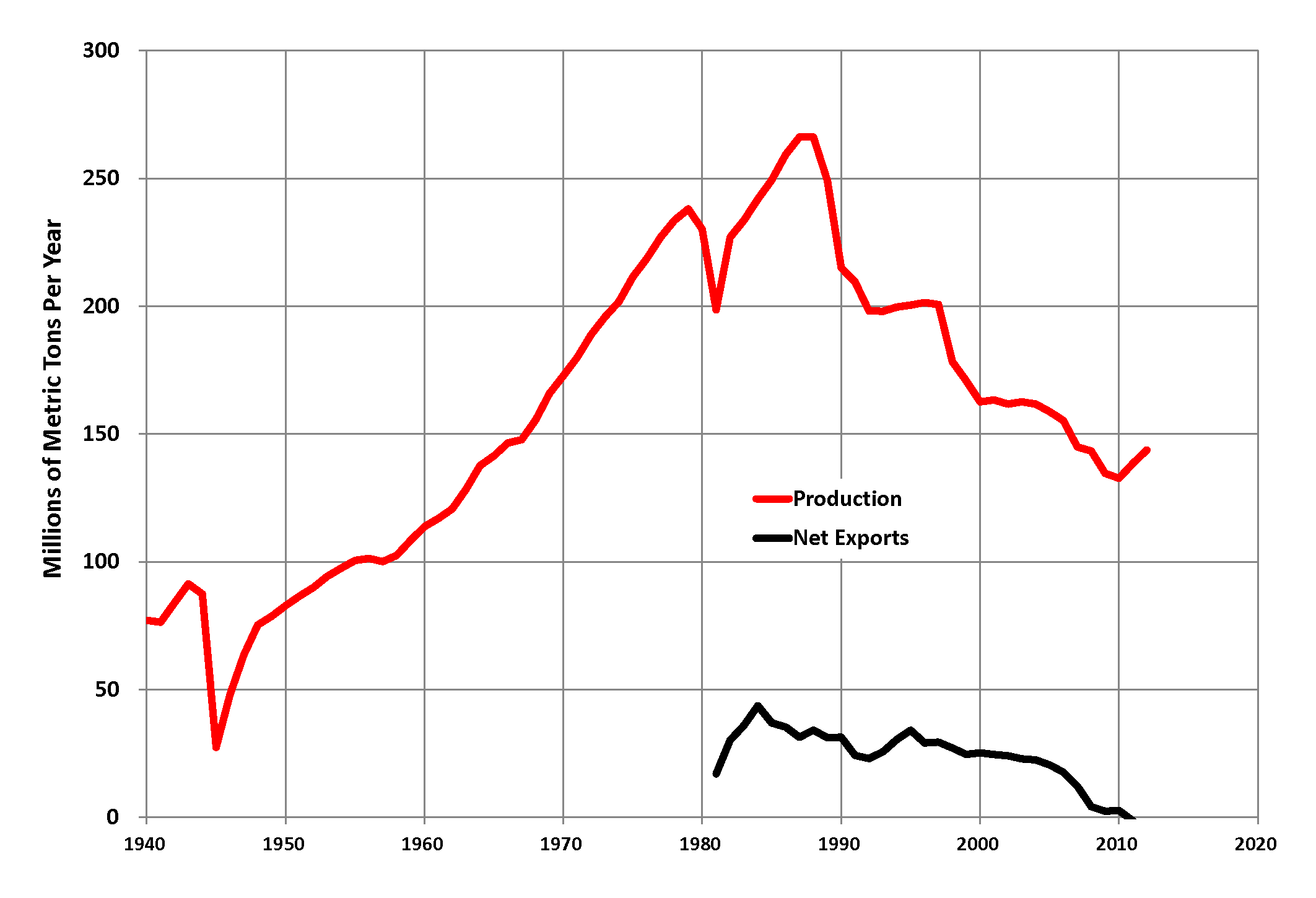
Coal production in Poland (1940–2012)

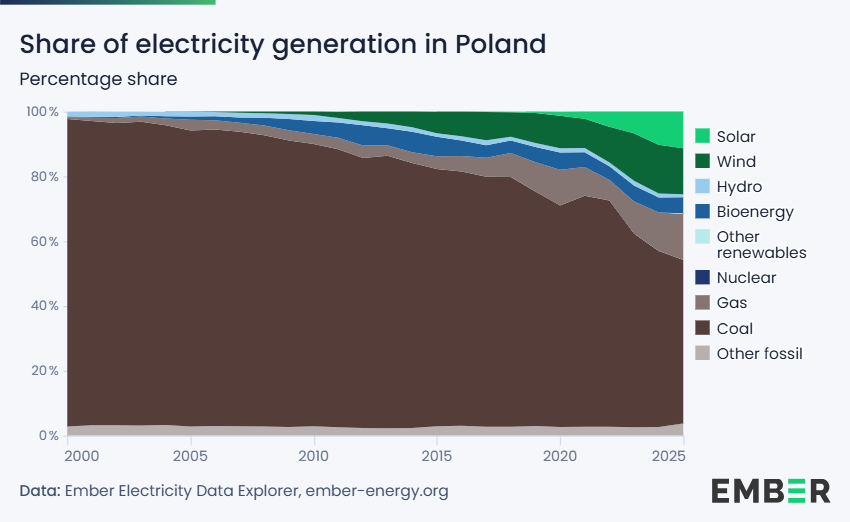
Poland electricity generation by source - percentage share

Coal in Poland is partly mined and partly imported. Poland is the second-largest coal-mining country in Europe, after Germany, and the ninth-largest coal producer in the world. The country consumes nearly all the coal it mines, and is no longer a major coal exporter.

Coal mines are concentrated mainly in Upper Silesia. The most profitable mines were Marcel Coal Mine and Zofiówka Coal Mine. Every third home in Poland uses coal for heating. Poland is the only EU country which mines hard coal.

In 2025 half of Poland's electricity was generated from coal. However extraction became increasingly difficult and expensive, and became uncompetitive against Russian imports, which were cheaper and of higher quality. Sometime after the 2022 Russian invasion of Ukraine Poland stopped importing from them. Coal mining now relies on government subsidies, taking billions of zloty every year. In 2020, the government and mining union agreed a plan to phase out coal by 2049, but this has been criticised by environmentalists as too late to be compatible with the Paris Agreement to limit climate change. As of 2025 methane still leaks from coal mines despite EU Methane Regulation.

=== Russia ===
Russia ranked as the fifth largest coal producing country in 2010, with a total production of 316.9 Mt. Russia has the world's second largest coal reserves. Although Russian oil and gas exports get a lot more attention, Russia is the world's third largest coal exporter and these exports are an important source of foreign revenue and are important for the coal mining communities. Russia and Norway share the coal resources of the Arctic archipelago of Svalbard, under the Svalbard Treaty.

=== Spain ===
Spain was ranked as the 30th coal producing country in the world in 2010. The coal miners of Spain were active in the Spanish Civil War on the Republican side. In October 1934, in Asturias, union miners and others suffered a fifteen-day siege in Oviedo and Gijon. There is a museum dedicated to coal mining in the region of Catalonia, called Cercs Mine Museum.

In October 2018, the Sánchez government and Spanish Labour unions settled an agreement to close ten Spanish coal mines at the end of 2018. The government pre-engaged to spend 250 million Euro to pay for early retirements, occupational retraining and structural change. In 2018, about 2,3 per cent of the electric energy produced in Spain was produced in coal-burning power plants.

=== South Africa ===
South Africa is one of the ten largest coal producing countries and the fourth largest coal exporting country in the world.

=== Taiwan ===
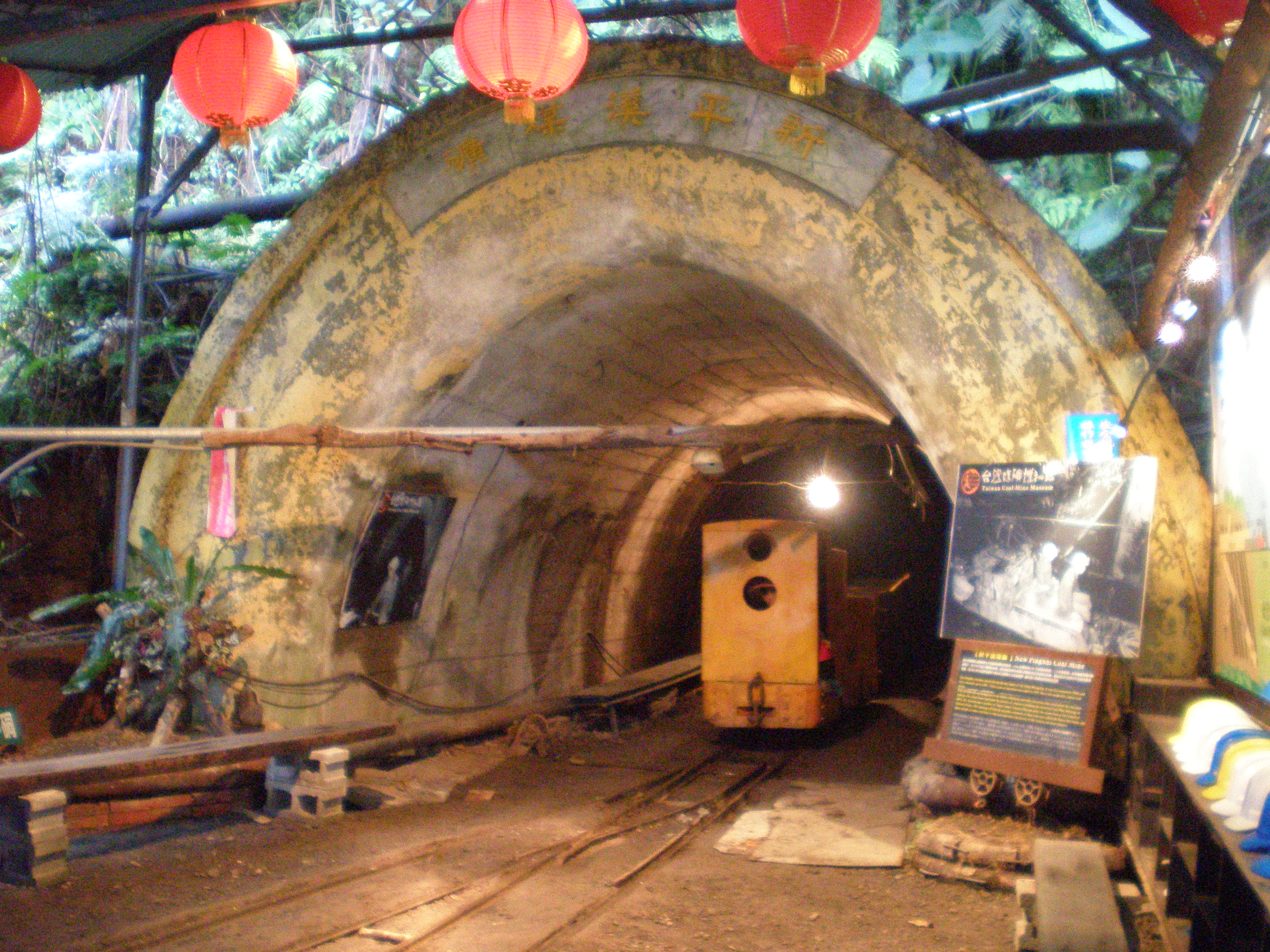
An abandoned coal mine in the Pingxi District of New Taipei, Taiwan

In Taiwan, coal is distributed mainly in the northern area. All of the commercial coal deposits occurred in three Miocene coal-bearing formations, which are the Upper, the Middle, and the Lower Coal Measures. The Middle Coal Measures was the most important with its wide distribution, great number of coal beds and extensive potential reserves. Taiwan has coal reserves estimated to be 100–180 Mt. However, coal output had been small, amounting to 6,948 metric tonnes per month from 4 pits before it ceased production effectively in 2000.

The abandoned coal mine in Pingxi District, New Taipei, has now turned into the Taiwan Coal Mine Museum.

=== Turkey ===
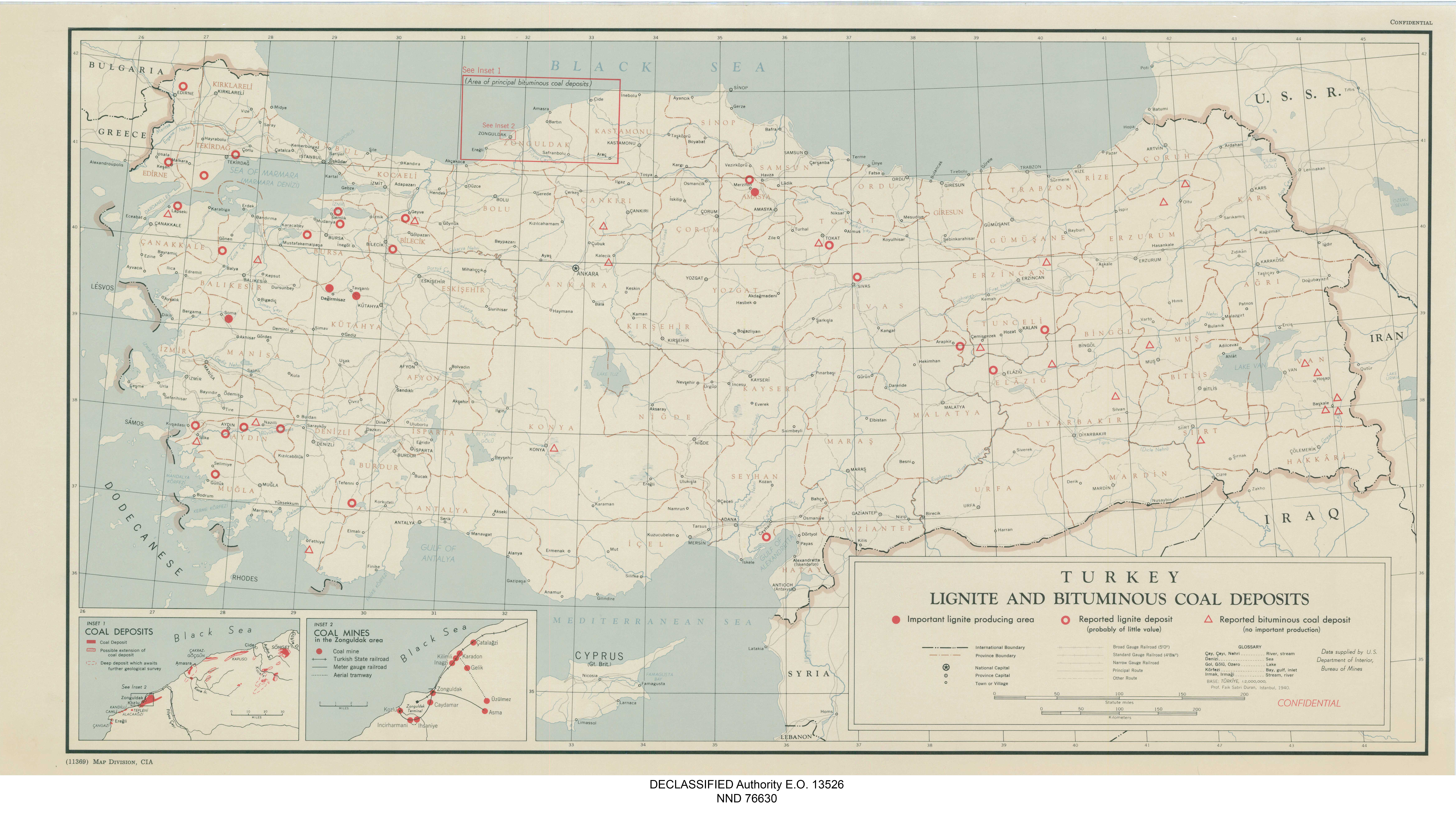
Map of coal deposits in Turkey, 1940

As of 2017 Turkey was 11th in the list of countries by coal production, and mined 1.3% of the world's coal, with lignite and sub-bituminous deposits widespread throughout the country. Due to the country's geology, there is no hard coal, which has a higher energy density (over 7,250 kcal/kg), within 1000 m of the surface. All coal deposits are owned by the state but over half of mining is done by the private sector. In 2017 almost half of Turkey's coal production was mined by the state-owned mines, but the government is seeking an expansion of privatization. As of 2019, there are 436 coal mining companies such as Akçelik, 740 coal mines, and more mining and exploration licences are being tendered. However, some drilling companies are not bidding for licences because mineral exploration is more profitable and in 2018 many mining licences were combined with coal licenses. Mining is documented in the "e-maden" computer system ("maden" means "mine" in Turkish). Coal miners do not have the right to strike. A company called Tarhan Maden has proposed a mine in the district of Tavşanlı in Kütahya Province. Unions have complained of mines they say are unsafe, such as Kınık coal mine. In July 2025 the government proposed that mining companies would not have to wait for EIA approval from the ministry.

=== Ukraine ===
In 2012 coal production in Ukraine amounted to 85.946 million tonnes, up 4.8% from 2011. Coal consumption that same year grew to 61.207 million tonnes, up 6.2% compared with 2011.

More than 90 percent of Ukraine's coal production comes from the Donets Basin. The country's coal industry employs about 500,000 people. Ukrainian coal mines are among the most dangerous in the world, and accidents are common. Furthermore, the country is plagued with extremely dangerous illegal mines.

=== United Kingdom ===
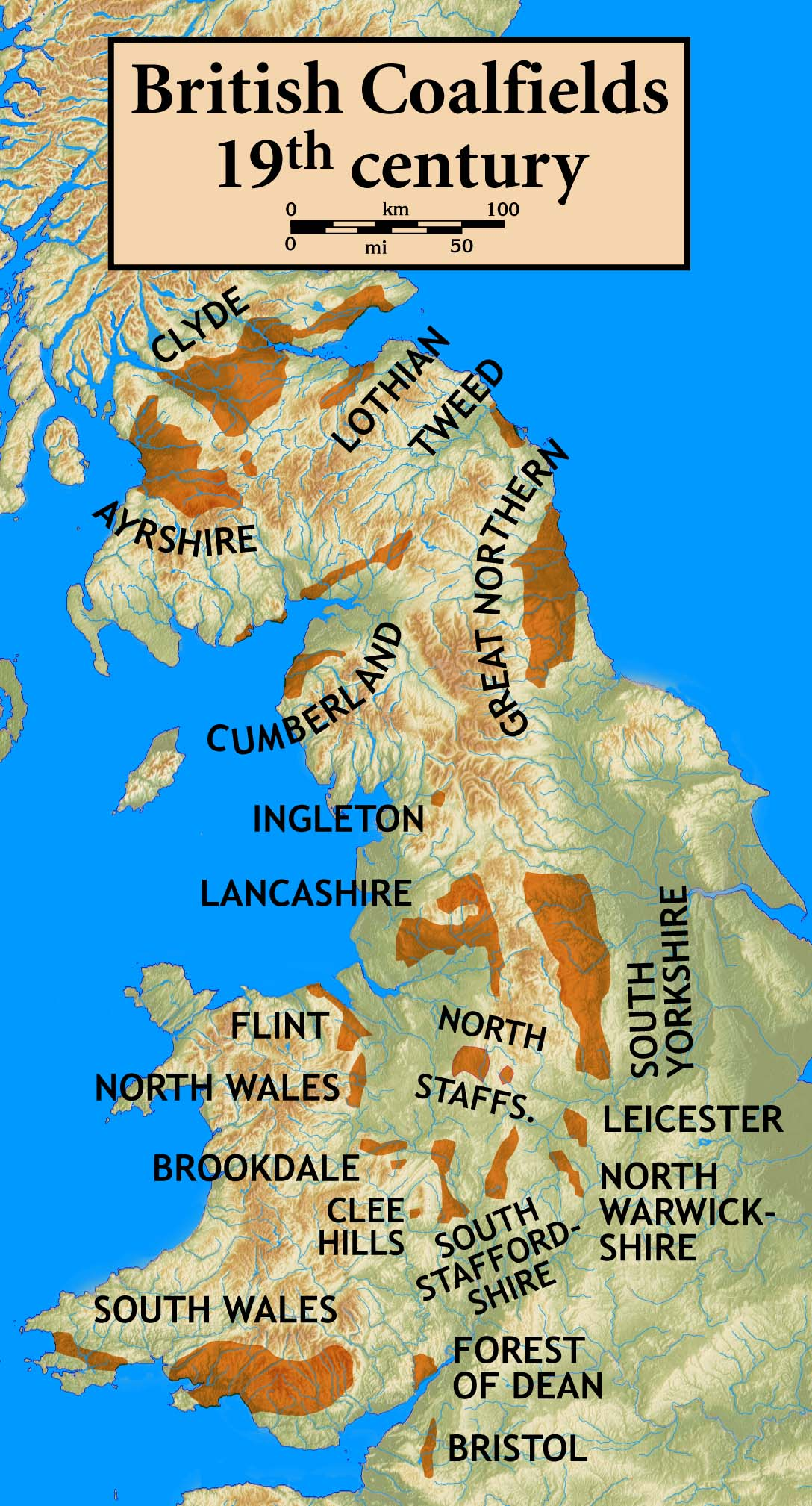
Coalfields of the United Kingdom in the 19th century

In the United Kingdom, coal mining dates back to Roman times and occurred in many different parts of the country. Britain's coalfields are associated with Northumberland and Durham, North and South Wales, Yorkshire, the Scottish Central Belt, Lancashire, Cumbria, the East and West Midlands and Kent. After 1972, coal mining quickly collapsed and had practically disappeared by the 21st century. In the winter of 2012–13, 40 per cent of Britain's energy needs were met by coal, most of it imported. Production fell from 228 million tonnes in 1957 to just 107 thousand tonnes in 2024, while coal consumption fell from 216 million to 2 million tonnes in the same time period. Employment in coal mines fell from a peak of 1,191,000 in 1920 to 695,000 in 1956, 247,000 in 1976, 44,000 in 1993, 2,000 in 2015, and to 360 in 2022.

Almost all onshore coal resources in the UK occur in rocks of the Carboniferous period, some of which extend under the North Sea. Bituminous coal is present in most of Britain's coalfields and is 86% to 88% carbon. In Northern Ireland, there are extensive deposits of lignite which is less energy-dense based on oxidation (combustion) at ordinary combustion temperatures. In 2015, European Association for Coal and Lignite (EURACOAL) estimated that the UK has 3.56 billion tonnes of hard coal resources.

In 2020, the proposed Woodhouse Colliery gained planning permission; the permission was later quashed by the High Court, and the project was scrapped in 2025.

As of 2026, there were two active coal mines in the United Kingdom: Aberpergwm in South Wales and Ayle Colliery in Northern England. Additionally, there were several Freemining plots in the Forest of Dean.

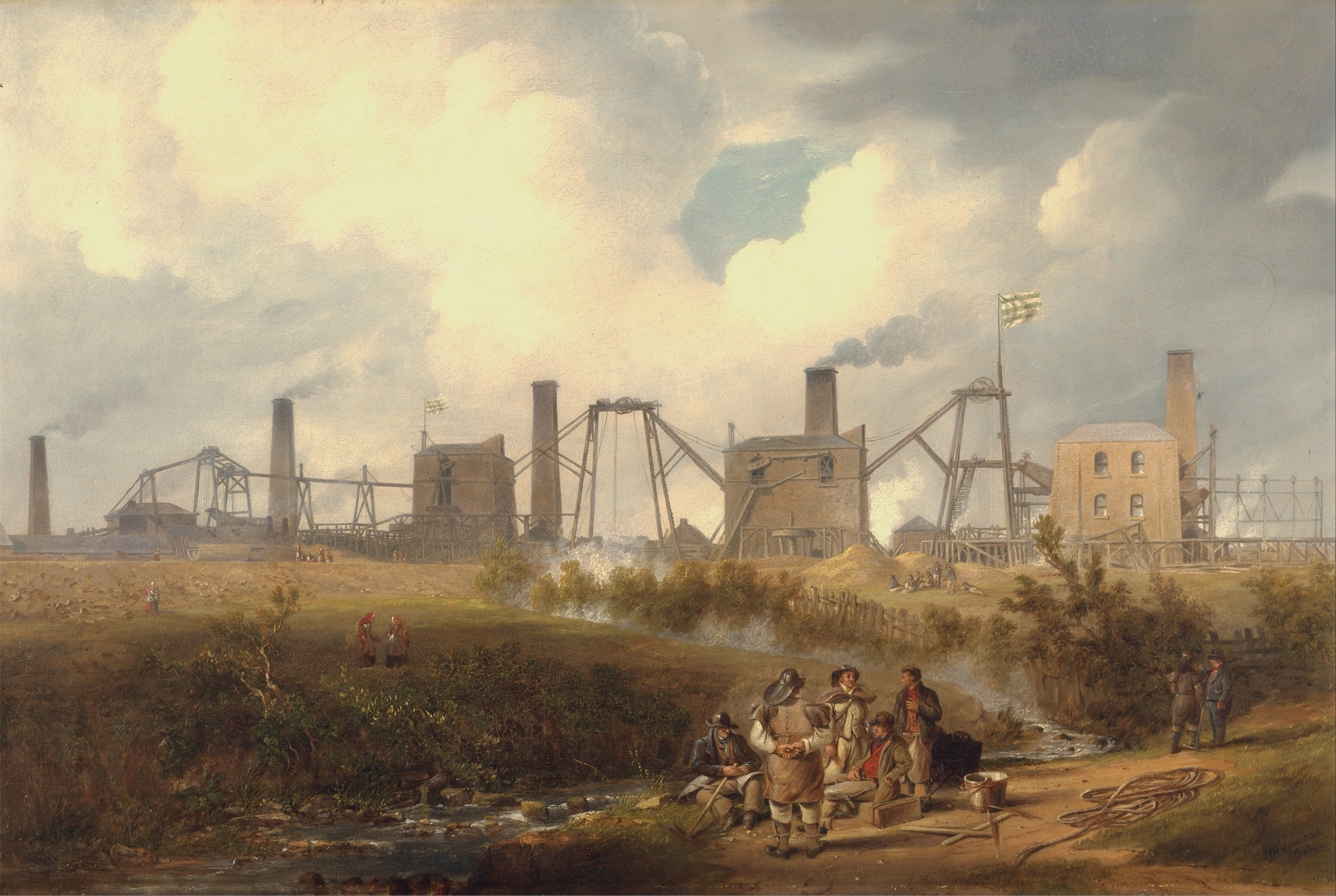
Murton colliery near Seaham, United Kingdom, in 1843

=== United States ===
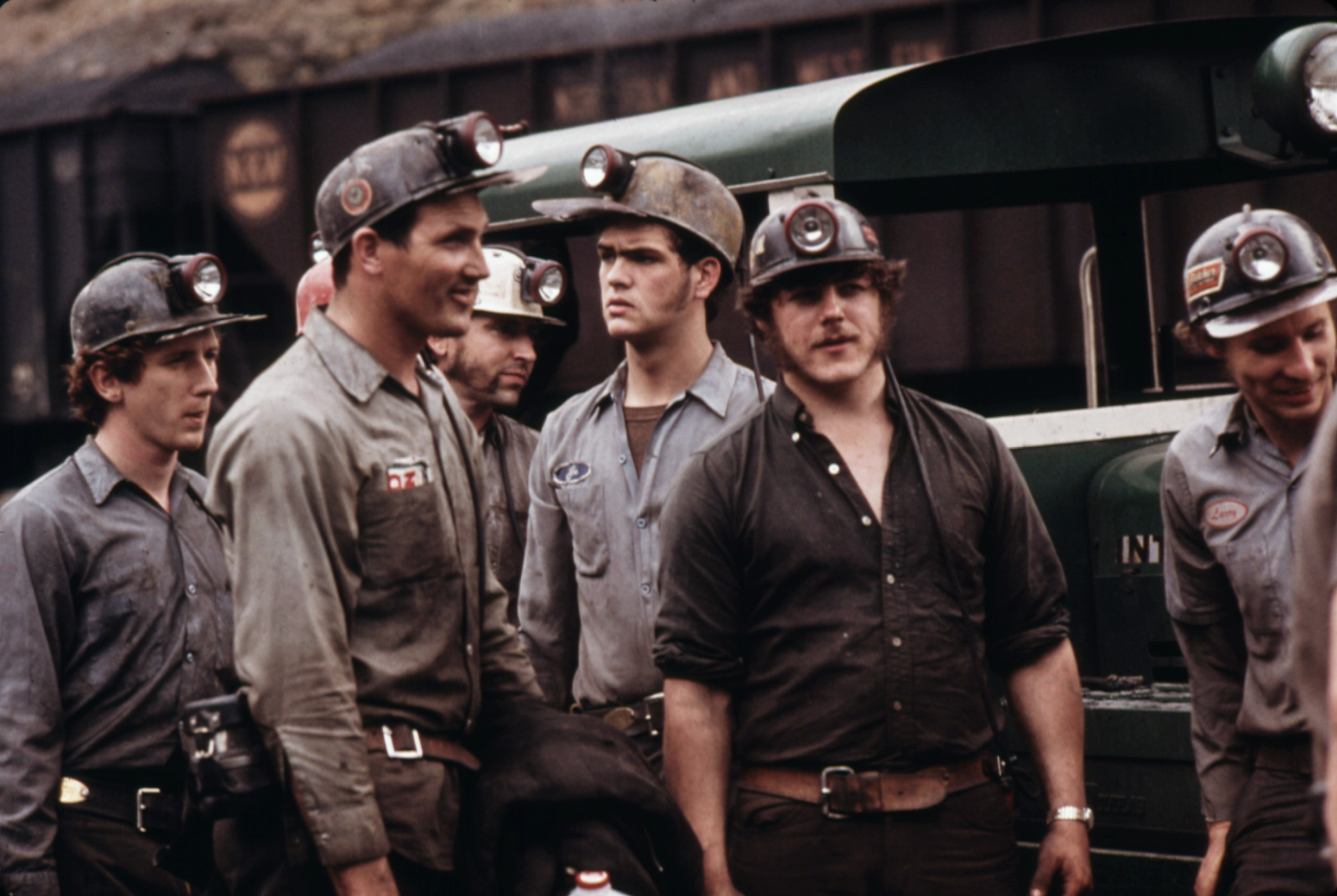
Miners at the Virginia-Pocahontas Coal Company Mine in 1974 waiting to go to work on the 4 pm to midnight shift

Coal began being mined in the United States in the early 18th century, and commercial mining started around 1730 in Midlothian, Virginia. The U.S. share of world coal production remained steady at about 20 percent from 1980 to 2005, at about 1 billion short tons per year. The United States was ranked as the second highest coal producing country in the world in 2010, and possesses the largest coal reserves in the world. In 2008 then-President George W. Bush stated that coal was the most reliable source of electricity.

In 2011, U.S. president Barack Obama said that the U.S. should rely more on cleaner sources of energy that emit lower or no carbon dioxide pollution. For a time, while domestic coal consumption for electric power was being displaced by natural gas, exports grew. U.S. net coal exports increased ninefold from 2006 to 2012, peaked at 117 million short tons in 2012, then declined to 63 million tons in 2015. In 2015, 60% of net US exports went to Europe, 27% to Asia. US coal production increasingly comes from strip mines in the western United States, such as from the Powder River Basin in Wyoming and Montana.

Coal has come under continued price pressure from natural gas and renewable energy, which has resulted in a rapid decline of coal in the U.S. and several notable bankruptcies including Peabody Energy. On 13 April 2016 the company reported that its revenue had reduced by 17 percent as coal prices fell and that it had lost two billion dollars the previous year. It then filed Chapter 11 bankruptcy on 13 April 2016. Harvard Business Review addressed retraining coal workers for solar photovoltaic employment because of the rapid rise in U.S. solar jobs. A 2016 study indicated that this was technically possible and would account for only 5% of the industrial revenue from a single year to provide coal workers with job security in the energy industry as a whole.

Donald Trump pledged to bring back coal jobs during the 2016 US presidential election, and as president he announced plans to reduce environmental protection, particularly by repealing the Clean Power Plan (CPP). However, industry observers have warned that this might not lead to a boom in mining jobs.

A 2019 projection by the Energy Information Administration estimated that coal production without CPP would decline over coming decades at a faster rate than indicated in the agency's 2017 projection, which had assumed the CPP was in effect.

=== Vietnam ===
The Quang Yen coalfield was discovered in Vietnam in the 1880s. Vinacomin estimates coal reserves in Vietnam at 50 billion tons, concentrated in the Northeastern basin and the Red River Delta coalfield.

== See also ==
- Black lung disease – Human disease caused by long-term exposure to coal dust
- George Bretz (photographer) – American photographer
- Child labour – Exploitation of children through work
- Coal Measures – Coal-bearing geological strata
- Coal mining in Plymouth, Pennsylvania
- Coal slurry impoundment – Product of coal preparation
- Coal town – Residential towns for employed miners and their families
- Coal train – Practice of transporting cargo by rail
- Coal-mining region – Basin with coal deposits
- Glossary of coal mining terminology
- Environmental impact of the coal industry
- Environmental justice and coal mining in Appalachia – Environmental protection and equity
- Hurrying – Hauling coal from a mine to the surface
- List of books about coal mining
- Mine fire – Underground smouldering of a coal deposit
- Mining accident – Accident occurring during the process of mining minerals
- Problems in coal mining
- Recovering of heat from old coal mines – Part of environmental remediation
