= Quảng Yên, Quảng Ninh =

Ward in Quảng Ninh city, Vietnam

Quảng Yên
- Ward
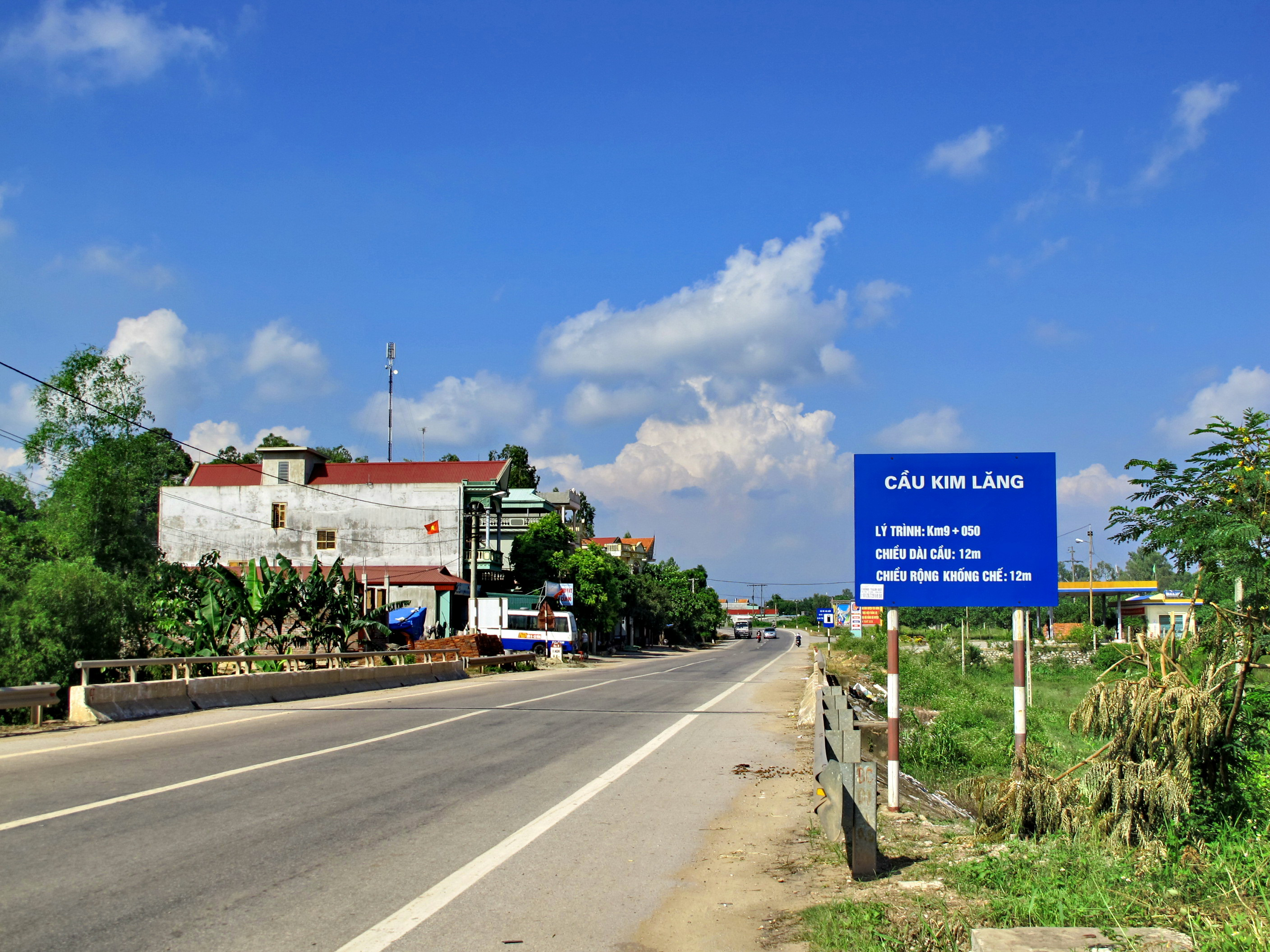
- A road in Quảng Yên
- Interactive map of Quảng Yên
- Country: Vietnam
- Region: Red River Delta
- Centrally- governed city: Quảng Ninh
- Established: June 16, 2025

Government
  - Type: Ward
  - Body: People's Council of Quảng Yên ward

Area
  - Total: 20.69 km^{2} (7.99 sq mi)

Population (2025)
  - Total: 31,353
  - Density: 1,515/km^{2} (3,925/sq mi)
- Time zone: UTC+07:00

Quảng Yên is a ward in Quảng Ninh city, Vietnam. It is one of 54 wards and communes in the city.

Prior to 2025, Quảng Yên was the name of a district-level town in Quảng Ninh province.

== Geography ==
Location of Quảng Yên ward on Quảng Ninh city map (highlight in red).

== History ==
Prior to 2025, the area of Quảng Yên ward was formerly Yên Giang, Quảng Yên wards and Tiền An commune of Quảng Yên district-level town in Quảng Ninh.

On June 16, 2025, the Standing Committee of the National Assembly of Vietnam issued Resolution No. 1679/NQ-UBTVQH15 on the reorganization of commune-level administrative units in Quảng Ninh province. Quảng Yên ward was established by merging the entire area and population of Yên Giang, Quảng Yên wards, and Tiền An commune (formerly part of Quảng Yên district-level town).

On September 1, 2025, Quảng Ninh city was established based on the entire Quảng Ninh province. Quảng Yên ward belongs to Quảng Ninh city.
