= Red River Delta =

River delta in Vietnam

Coordinates: 21°02′N 105°51′E

Red River Delta Đồng bằng sông Hồng
- Location of the Red River Delta region in Vietnam at top in purple
- Country: Vietnam
- Largest city: Hanoi

Area
  - Total: 27,091.97 km^{2} (10,460.27 sq mi)

Population (2025)
  - Total: 29,093,925
  - Density: 1,073.895/km^{2} (2,781.375/sq mi)

GDP
  - Total: VND 1,753 trillion US$ 77.0 billion (2021)
- Time zone: UTC+7 (UTC +7)
- HDI (2023): 0.809 high · 1st

The Red River Delta, or Hong River Delta (Vietnamese: Đồng bằng sông Hồng), is the flat low-lying plain formed by the Red River and its distributaries that merges with the Thái Bình River in northern Vietnam. Hồng (紅) is a Sino-Vietnamese word for "red" or "crimson". The delta has the smallest area but the highest population and population density of all of the regions in Vietnam.

The Red River Delta, at some 15,000 km^{2} (6,000 sq mi), is well protected by a network of dikes and is an agriculturally rich and densely populated area. Most of its land is devoted to rice cultivation.

After the 2025 merger of Vietnamese provinces and cities, the Red River Delta includes four provinces and two municipalities. Its population was nearly 23 million in 2019. Two of the four provinces, Bắc Ninh and Quảng Ninh, became municipalities in September 2026.

In 2021, Paul Sidwell proposed that the locus of Proto-Austroasiatic was in the area about 4,000 to 4,500 years gao.

The Hong River Delta is the cradle of the Vietnamese nation. Water puppetry originated in its rice paddies. The region was bombed by United States warplanes during the Vietnam War.

The region was designated as the Red River Delta Biosphere Reserve as part of UNESCO's Man and the Biosphere Programme in 2004.

== Provinces ==
Statistics of the Red River Delta
Province-level division	Population (2025)	Area (in km^{2})	Population density (/km^{2})
Hưng Yên	3,567,943	2,514.81	1,418.77
Ninh Bình	4,412,264	3,942.62	1,119.12
Bắc Ninh (municipality)	3,619,433	4,718.6	767.06
Hanoi (municipality)	8,807,523	3,359.84	2,621.41
Haiphong (municipality)	4,664,124	3,194.72	1,459
Quảng Ninh (municipality)	1,497,447	6,207.95	241.214

== Geography ==
Spanning some 150 km wide, the Red River Delta is located in the western coastal zone of the Gulf of Tonkin. The Red River is the second largest river in Vietnam and one of the five largest rivers on the East Asian coast. Its catchment area covers parts of China and Vietnam and its water, and its sediment discharges greatly influence the hydrology of the Gulf of Tonkin.

== Delta economy ==
In 2003, of the 78 million people in Vietnam, almost a third of them (24 million) live in the Red River basin, including over 17 million people in the delta itself. Many large industrial zones in the Red River Delta cluster in Viet Tri, Hanoi, Haiphong, and Nam Dinh. Most of its population works in rice cultivation, but the region hosts other important economic activities such as fisheries, aquaculture, land reclamation for agriculture, harbor construction, and mangrove forestry. The socio-economic development in the delta is also affected by events such as seasonal storms, flooding, coastal erosion, silting, and salt water intrusion.

The Red River Delta has only 5% of Vietnam's land but 30% of the country's population, which makes it the most densely populated rtra. 80% of the population are employed in agriculture, but since the agricultural lands of the delta are only about 0.3-0.5 ha per household, the limited supply of arable lands is a significant constraint to improving living standards.

Agriculturally, the Red River Delta is the second most important rice-producing area in Vietnam and accounts for 20% of the national crop. The production of rice close to optimal, with very little yield gap to exploit, and uses double-cropping techniques to achieve close-to-maximum yields. However, the delta's rich soil presents a possibility of crop diversification and the potential for the further development of aquaculture. With those developmental pressures, the estuarine environment and ecosystem face degradation from the threats of pollution, overfishing, and aquaculture destroying natural habitats.

== See also ==
- Red River Delta coalfield
