= Quảng Yên, Phú Thọ =

Quảng Yên
- Commune
- Interactive map of Quảng Yên
- Coordinates: 21°29′17″N 105°11′11″E
- Country: Vietnam
- Region: Northeast
- Province: Phú Thọ
- Established: 1 January 2020
- Administrative headquarters: Minh Tân Area

Area
  - Total: 39.58 km^{2} (15.28 sq mi)

Population (2025)
  - Total: 15,056
  - Density: 380/km^{2} (980/sq mi)
- Postal code: 35707
- Website: quangyen.phutho.gov.vn

Quảng Yên is a commune in Phú Thọ province, Vietnam.

On 16 June 2025, the National Assembly of Vietnam adopted Resolution No. 203/2025/QH15 amending and supplementing several articles of the Constitution of the Socialist Republic of Vietnam, effective on the same date. Under the resolution, district-level administrative units nationwide ceased to operate from 1 July 2025.

The Standing Committee of the National Assembly of Vietnam issued Resolution No. 1676/NQ-UBTVQH15 on the arrangement of commune-level administrative units in Phú Thọ province in 2025, effective from 16 June 2025. Under the resolution, the entire area and population of Đại An, Đông Lĩnh, and Quảng Yên communes were merged to form a new commune named Quảng Yên.
