= Quảng Yên, Thanh Hóa =

Quảng Yên
- Commune
- Interactive map of Quảng Yên
- Coordinates: 19°43′42″N 105°43′49″E
- Country: Vietnam
- Region: North Central Coast
- Province: Thanh Hóa
- Established: 1948 (commune in Quảng Xương district); 16 June 2025 (commune under Thanh Hóa province)
- Administrative headquarters: Khang Bình Hamlet

Area
  - Total: 24.92 km^{2} (9.62 sq mi)

Population (2024)
  - Total: 27,768
  - Density: 1,114/km^{2} (2,890/sq mi)
- Postal code: 42614
- Website: quangyen.thanhhoa.gov.vn

Quảng Yên is a commune in Thanh Hóa province, Vietnam.

== History ==
The commune was established in 1948 as a commune of Quảng Xương district.

On 16 June 2025, Quảng Xương district was dissolved as part of the abolition of district-level administrative units. Quảng Yên Commune was established under Resolution No. 1686/NQ-UBTVQH15 of the Standing Committee of the National Assembly of Vietnam through the merger of the entire area and population of four communes: Quảng Trạch, Quảng Hòa, Quảng Long, and Quảng Yên.
