= Quảng Yên (town) =

Former district-level town of the former Quảng Ninh province, Vietnam

Quảng Yên Yên Hưng
- District-level town (Class-4)
- Quảng Yên Town; Thị xã Quảng Yên
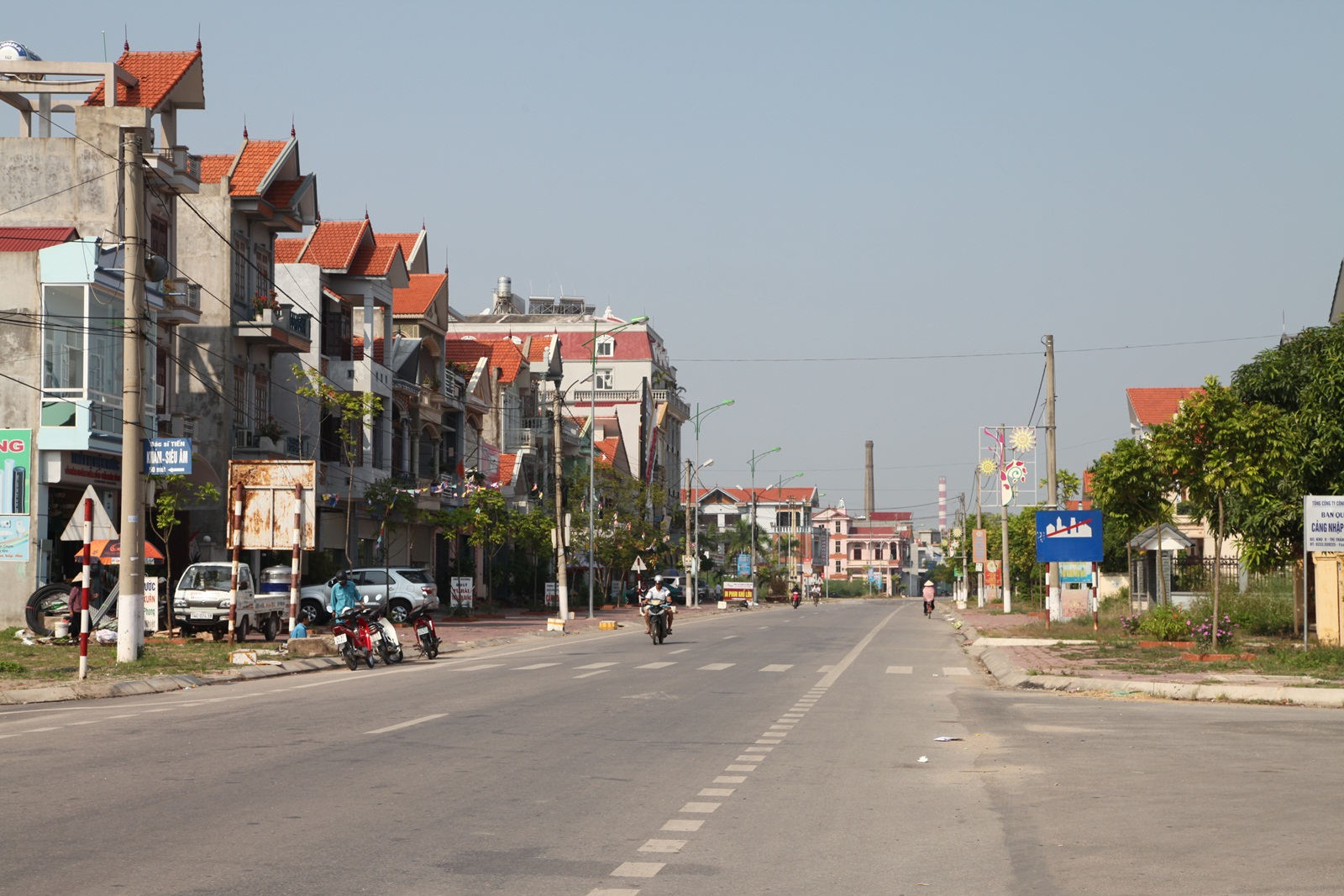
- Trần Nhân Tông Street in Quảng Yên town

- Seal
- Interactive map outlining Quảng Yên
- Location within Vietnam Location within Southeast Asia Location within Asia
- Coordinates: 20°56′20″N 106°48′0″E
- Country: Vietnam
- Region: north-east
- Province: Quảng Ninh
- Founded: 2011

Area
  - District-level town (Class-4): 121.314 sq mi (314.202 km^{2})
  - Urban: 58.6052 sq mi (151.7868 km^{2})

Population (2019)
  - District-level town (Class-4): 180,028
  - Density: 1,150/sq mi (444.2/km^{2})
  - Urban: 85,493
  - Urban density: 1,459/sq mi (563.2/km^{2})
- Time zone: UTC+7 (UTC + 7)
- Website: quangyen.quangninh.gov.vn

Quảng Yên is a former district-level town of Quảng Ninh province in the North-east region of Vietnam. The Bạch Đằng River flows through Yên Hưng. As of 2003 the district had a population of 137,198. The town was established by 2011 from former district of Yên Hưng, which covers an area of 314.2 km^{2} (121.3 sq mi). Quảng Yên border Hạ Long provincial city to the north and east, Halong bay to the East, Thủy Nguyên, Cát Hải district, Hải Phòng centrally-governed city to the west and south, Uông Bí provincial city.

== Administrative divisions ==
The town consists of 11 wards: Cộng Hòa, Đông Mai, Hà An, Minh Thành, Nam Hòa, Phong Cốc, Phong Hải, Quảng Yên, Tân An, Yên Giang, Yên Hải, and 8 communes: Cẩm La, Hoàng Tân, Hiệp Hòa, Liên Hòa, Liên Vị, Sông Khoai and Tiền An.
