= Red River Delta coalfield =

Geological region in Thailand

- Location: Thái Bình Province, Vietnam
- Products: Coal

The Red River Delta coalfield is a geological region located in northern Vietnam, in Thái Bình province.

The coalfield contains one of the largest coal reserves in Vietnam and has an estimated reserve of 210 billion tons of coal.
