= Quang Yen coalfield =

- Location: Lào Cai Province, Vietnam
- Products: Coal

The Quang Yen is a large coal field located in the north of Vietnam in Quảng Ninh. It was discovered in the late 19th century. Quang Yen represents one of the largest coal reserves in Vietnam having estimated reserves of 3.3 billion tonnes of coal.
