= Robert E. Murray =

American mining businessman (1940–2020)

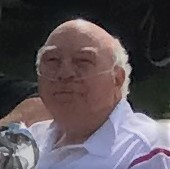
- Robert Murray in 2019
- Born: Robert Edward Murray; January 13, 1940; Martins Ferry, Ohio, U.S.
- Died: October 25, 2020 (aged 80); St. Clairsville, Ohio, U.S.
- Education: Ohio State University (BE)
- Occupation: Business executive
- Political party: Republican
- Spouse: Brenda Lou Moore
- Children: 3

Robert Edward Murray (January 13, 1940 – October 25, 2020) was an American mining engineer and businessman. He founded and was the chief executive officer of Murray Energy, a mining corporation based in St. Clairsville, Ohio, until it filed for bankruptcy. Murray was criticized for his denial of climate change, his actions following the Crandall Canyon Mine collapse, and for several large strategic lawsuits against public participation (SLAPPs) he initiated. Multiple allegations of sexual misconduct were brought against him in 2014 and 2016, which were later settled out of court.

== Early life ==
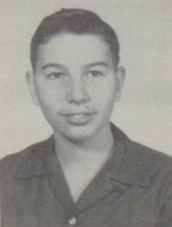
Murray c. 1956

Murray was born on January 13, 1940, in Martins Ferry, Ohio. He said he lied about his age so he could work in a coal mine at the age of 16 and provide for his family, had experienced multiple mining accidents including a head injury from being struck by a steel beam, had a scar running from his head down his back from a separate accident, and once was trapped in a dark mine for 12 hours before being rescued.

Murray was the valedictorian of the Bethesda High School class of 1957. He received a Bachelor of Engineering in Mining from Ohio State University, and attended a six-week management program at Harvard Business School.

== Career ==
Murray began his mining career at the North American Coal Corporation (NACC). He served in a variety of capacities at NACC, winning election to vice president of operations in 1969. From 1974 to 1983, Murray was president of NACC's Western Division and presided over four of its subsidiaries in North Dakota. In 1974, a strike took place at the Indian Head Mine in Zap, which NACC was attempting to close. In 1983, he became president and CEO of NACC.

Murray was a member of the boards of directors of the National Mining Association, American Coal Foundation, National Coal Council, Ohio Coal Association, and Pennsylvania Coal Association. He was a trustee and former president of the American Institute of Mining, Metallurgical, and Petroleum Engineers, Inc., and the Society for Mining, Metallurgy and Exploration, Inc., and president of The Rocky Mountain Coal Mining Institute.

=== Murray Energy ===
Murray founded Murray Energy in 1988 when he bought the Powhatan No. 6 mine from the Ohio Valley Coal Company. Murray focused on high-heat bituminous coal, which he thought would be in demand for power generation. The company later moved towards metallurgical coal used to produce coke for steel production.

Murray told the White House in a letter dated August 4, 2017, that without an emergency order under the Federal Power Act to restart coal-fired electrical generating plants, his company and a major customer, power plant operator FirstEnergy Solutions, would declare bankruptcy. His request was rejected by the White House and the Department of Energy.

Murray Energy Holdings, Co. filed bankruptcy in the United States District Court for the Southern District of Ohio on October 29, 2019. Murray was replaced as CEO the same day, although he remained chairman of the board of the new entity, Murray NewCo, while his nephew Robert D. Moore would be president and CEO. Employees expressed concern about losing their pensions and/or medical benefits. Murray was the last major coal contributor to the United Mine Workers of America's pension plan.

=== Crandall Canyon Mine collapse ===
In August 2007, six miners were trapped at the Crandall Canyon Mine in Utah, which was co-owned and operated by Murray Energy subsidiary UtahAmerican Energy. Three rescue workers died attempting to reach the miners, and a series of boreholes found that the miners were unlikely to have survived. The miners were declared dead, and their bodies were never recovered. Prior to the collapse, the Crandall Canyon Mine had received 64 violations and was fined $12,000.

Murray claimed that the Crandall Canyon Mine collapse was triggered by a natural 3.9 magnitude earthquake and that the practice of retreat mining was not responsible. Responding to reports of retreat mining, Murray said: "I wish you would take the word retreat mining out of your vocabulary. Those were words invented by Davitt McAteer, Oppegard, who are lackies for the United Mine Workers, and officials at the United Mine Workers, who would like to organize this coal mine."

Seismologists and government officials disputed this claim, and said the mine collapse was the cause of a coal mine bump that was caused by the mine's use of retreat mining. Richard E. Stickler, the government's top mine safety official, said: "It was not—and I repeat, it was not—a natural occurring earthquake." An analysis by seismologists at the University of California, Berkeley found that the seismic event was "consistent with an underground collapse". Researchers at the University of Utah also stated that the tremor was not triggered by an earthquake.

On July 24, 2008, the U.S. government's Mine Safety and Health Administration (MSHA) announced its highest penalty for coal mine safety violations, $1.85 million, for the collapse. The government fined Genwal Resources $1.34 million "for violations that directly contributed to the deaths of six miners last year", plus nearly $300,000 for other violations. The government also levied a $220,000 fine against a mining consultant, Agapito Associates, "for faulty analysis of the mine's design".

Robert Murray was criticized for his actions during the rescue attempt. The MSHA cited his volatile behavior, especially at daily briefings for family members. MSHA reported that he "frequently became very irate and would start yelling", even making young children cry. He told family members that "the media is telling you lies" and "the union is your enemy."

== Political activity ==
From 2005 to 2007, the Murray Energy PAC donated over $150,000 to Republican candidates, including donations totaling $30,000 to Senate candidates such as George Allen, Sam Brownback, and Katherine Harris. Donations to Republicans surpassed $1 million from 2005 to 2018. The Ohio Valley Coal PAC, another group affiliated with Murray Energy, donated $10,000 for George W. Bush's 2000 Presidential campaign.

In the wake of the 2006 Sago Mine disaster, lawmakers in West Virginia and Ohio proposed legislation requiring mine workers to wear emergency tracking devices. Murray lobbied against the laws, calling them "extremely misguided." He said that politicians were rushing to pass laws and thus "playing politics with the safety of my employees." Murray said that rather than create "knee-jerk" state laws after the disaster, such as in the case of West Virginia, which passed the law in less than one day after it was proposed, the federal government should host a panel which would study the industry and make recommendations for safety measures.

Murray said the federal government should be involved for uniform standards and because tension between unions and companies created difficulty in reaching private agreement on safety standards. He maintained that the personal tracking devices to be mandated in the state laws, called PEDs, did not work under certain common mining conditions (such as below 600 feet (180 m) in depth), and better devices needed to be developed in order to effectively guard miners in case of accident. He said: "The will is there. Unfortunately, the technology isn't."

Murray had stated that he supported federal mandates for drug testing and fire prevention.

On August 14, 2012, Murray hosted Mitt Romney at Murray Energy's Century coal mine in Beallsville, Ohio. Several miners contacted a nearby morning talk radio host, David Blomquist, to complain that they were forced to attend the rally without pay. Murray Energy's chief operating officer Robert Moore said: "Attendance was mandatory but no one was forced to attend the event." Murray closed the mine the day of the rally and suspended pay to workers, arguing that the rally was important to the coal industry and that attending was in the workers' "best interest". Murray and his corporation were a major donor to Romney and other Republicans, and employees reported frequent instances of political pressure from management.

In October 2012, the non-profit group Citizens for Responsibility and Ethics in Washington filed a complaint with the Federal Election Commission against Murray and his company alleging violations of federal campaign law in which employees of Murray Energy were required to give one percent of their salary to the company's political action committee.

On November 9, 2012, three days following the presidential election, Murray laid off 156 workers, citing a supposed "war on coal" by the Obama administration as the reason for his decision.

During the 2016 American presidential election, Murray Energy donated over $300,000 towards candidate Donald Trump's inauguration. A memo from Murray itemized a list of 16 energy actions he desired, including giving subsidies to nuclear and coal plants, reducing mine safety regulations, and reducing environmental oversight. The memo was given to Vice President Mike Pence. A similar memo was given to Department of Energy head Rick Perry, and Murray said he gave the memo to Trump.

Murray continued to lobby on energy matters at both the state and national levels until his death.

=== Global warming denial ===
Murray denied the scientific consensus on climate change. In June 2007, Murray told the United States Senate Committee on Environment and Public Works that "the science of global warming is suspect". He also wrote in a May 2007 MarketWatch editorial: "The actual environmental risk associated with carbon emissions is highly speculative."

In a 2007 speech to the New York Coal Trade Association, Murray called Al Gore "the shaman of global gloom and doom" and added "he is more dangerous than his global warming."

Murray was an opponent of proposed global warming legislation in Congress, saying, "Every one of those global warming bills that have been introduced into Congress today eliminates the coal industry and will increase your electric rates, four to five fold."

Following the presidential election in November 2016, Murray pressed for Donald Trump to withdraw the United States from all international agreements on climate change and stated: "so-called global warming is a total hoax."

== Lawsuits ==
=== Journalists and the press ===
Murray filed over a dozen defamation lawsuits against journalists and newspapers, none of which was resolved in his favor. For example, Robert Murray and Murray Energy filed lawsuits against environment reporter Ken Ward Jr. from The Charleston Gazette, philosopher and contributor to The Huffington Post Michael Stark, reporter Margaret Newkirk from the Akron Beacon Journal and the Chagrin Valley Times; he also threatened to sue Steve Fiscor, editor of Coal Age and Engineering & Mining Journal, and R. Larry Grayson, a writer and professor emeritus of energy and mineral engineering at Pennsylvania State University.

=== Last Week Tonight ===
In June 2017, Murray issued a cease and desist letter to the television show Last Week Tonight following the show's attempt to obtain comment about the coal industry. The show went ahead with the episode, "Coal", on June 18, in which host John Oliver discussed the Crandall Canyon Mine collapse and expressed the opinion that Murray did not do enough to protect his miners' safety. The episode featured a cast member in a squirrel costume with a novelty check bearing the words "Eat Shit, Bob" in reference to a 2015 incident where, in response to a bonus program implemented at one of Murray's mines which union members feared would undermine safety, a miner voided his $3.22 bonus check, wrote those words on the back of it, and returned it to management.

On June 21, Murray and his companies brought suit against Oliver, the show's writers, the show's network, HBO, and HBO's corporate owner, Time Warner. The lawsuit alleged that, in the Last Week Tonight episode, Oliver "incited viewers to do harm to Mr. Murray and his companies." The ACLU filed an amicus brief that described "the ridiculous case at hand" as a transparent attempt to use the court system to punish legal speech, and gained notoriety for its snarky tone. The defendants removed the action to federal court, but in August 2017, a federal district court judge ruled that there was no diversity jurisdiction and remanded Murray Energy's suits against The New York Times and HBO to West Virginia state court. The suit against HBO was dismissed with prejudice on February 21, 2018.

After Murray dropped an appeal, John Oliver discussed the implications of the lawsuit in his show's November 10, 2019 episode, "SLAPP Suits." Oliver noted that Murray could minimize his personal risk by filing his lawsuit in West Virginia, a jurisdiction where neither Oliver nor Murray lived and that had no legislation to deter SLAPPs (strategic lawsuit against public participation). HBO was forced to cover $200,000 in legal fees. Oliver noted that the threat of such lawsuits, and Murray's reputation for litigiousness, may have deterred other media outlets from covering such things as the sexual harassment lawsuits ongoing against Murray.

"SLAPP Suits" ended with Oliver leading a musical number, "Eat Shit, Bob!" The circuit court judge in the case had noted that the Supreme Court has long upheld "'loose, figurative' language that cannot reasonably be understood to convey facts" as protected speech; accordingly, the number leveled a series of intentionally outlandish and obviously false accusations at Murray, including those of murdering Archduke Ferdinand and starting World War I, filling a rocket with puppies and sending it into space, having sexual relations with squirrels per a barbershop quartet, and being the Zodiac Killer. The episode won the Primetime Emmy Award for Outstanding Picture Editing for Variety Programming and was nominated for Outstanding Original Music and Lyrics.

=== Workplace sexual harassment ===
In 2014, two lawsuits were filed against Murray for sexual harassment and misconduct against his employees. Murray reached confidential settlement agreements with both parties. In 2016, a third lawsuit was filed against Murray for sexual harassment against an employee.

== Personal life ==
Murray resided in Moreland Hills, Ohio, with his wife, Brenda Lou Moore. They had three children.

Murray stated that he suffered from idiopathic pulmonary fibrosis, a scarring of the lung tissue leading to shortness of breath. In September 2020, he filed application for black lung benefits with the U.S. Department of Labor. While running coal mining companies, Murray disputed claims filed by miners for black lung benefits and was an advocate against federal regulations intended to reduce black lung.

=== Philanthropy ===
In 2009, Murray Energy donated $20,000 to support the development of a state-of-the-art mine training facility at West Virginia University and $10,000 to support the construction of a similar facility at Southeastern Illinois College. Murray also made a personal gift of $1 million to the West Virginia University Research Trust Fund—the largest single donation in the fund's history—and the university established the Robert E. Murray Chairmanship of Mining Engineering in his honor.

In 2018, Murray donated over $1.2 million to a project to construct a new building at the East Richland Christian School. The 28,000-square-foot (2,600 m^{2}) center is planned to house a gymnasium, kitchen, and classrooms for use by the school, local church, and wider community.

Murray was an active volunteer with the Ohio River Valley Council of the Boy Scouts of America.

=== Death ===
Murray died on October 25, 2020, at the age of 80, six days after he announced his retirement.
