= Joe Main =

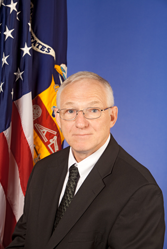

Assistant Secretary of Labor for Mine Safety and Health
- In office October 21, 2009 – January 20, 2017
- President: Barack Obama
- Preceded by: Dick Stickler
- Succeeded by: David Zatezalo

Personal details
- Born: Waynesburg, Pennsylvania

Joe Main is an American government official who formerly served as the Assistant Secretary of Labor for Mine Safety and Health and head of the United States Department of Labor's Mine Safety and Health Administration. He was nominated to serve the position by Barack Obama and took office after being confirmed by the United States Senate on October 21, 2009.

Main was born and raised in Waynesburg, Greene County, Pennsylvania. He began working in coal mines in 1967. In 1974 he was hired as an assistant to the International President of the United Mine Workers of America. He later served as a safety inspector, administrative assistant and deputy director in the UMWA's Safety Division. In 1982 he was appointed administrator of the UMWA Occupational Health and Safety Department where he oversaw health and safety programs.

President Obama's nomination of Main met with support from the UMWA and Representative George Miller, chairman of the House Committee on Education and Labor. In a statement, the UMWA said "we look forward to working with Joe and Secretary of Labor Hilda Solis to reverse the years of decline in both labor law and health and safety enforcement that occurred at the Department of Labor and MSHA under the previous administration."

Between his nomination to head the MSHA and concluding his career with UMWA, Main worked as a mine safety consultant and served on federal advisory committees, joint labor-management committees, mining industry partnerships and international committees relating to mine safety.

With Main's Senate confirmation on October 21, 2009, he became the first to be confirmed to the MSHA position since 2004, following acting-Assistant Secretary Dick Stickler. He was expected to initiate more strict regulations as a result of a 2006 law passed after a series of mine accidents resulted in the deaths of 47 miners.

The Charleston Gazette described Main's objectives in his role at MSHA following a conference call in which he describes his plans to the media. They included acting "fairly quickly" on a plan to end black lung disease; examine changes to emergency response procedures following accidents including those at Sago, Aracoma, and Crandall Canyon in 2006 and 2007; and taking a more supportive stance with whistleblowers who report unsafe working conditions.
