= Cave-in =

Type of structural collapse

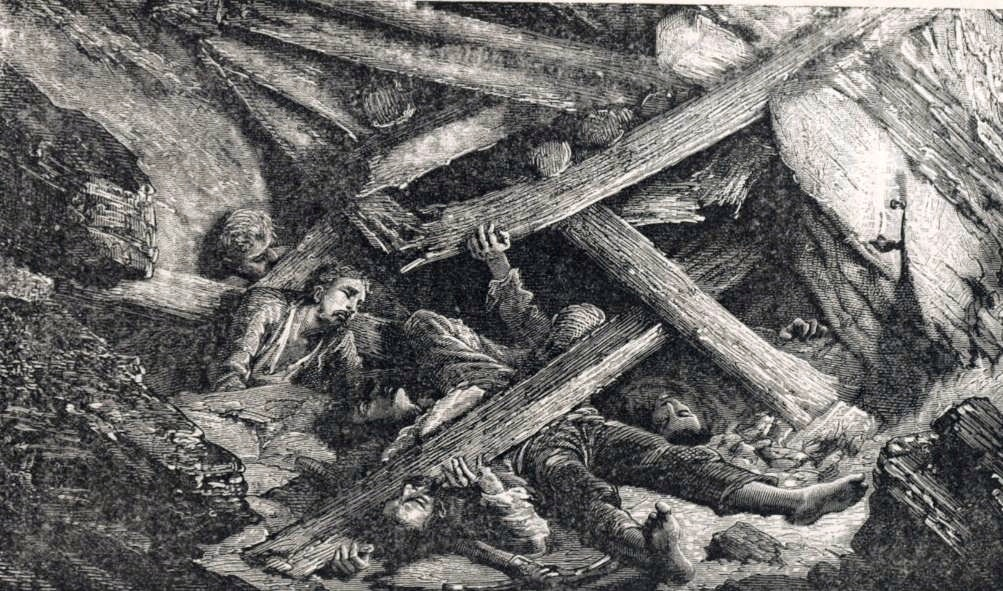
Illustration of mine collapse aftermath, from 1878

A cave-in is a collapse of a geologic formation, mine or structure which may occur during mining, tunneling, or steep-walled excavation such as trenching. Geologic structures prone to spontaneous cave-ins include alvar, tsingy and other limestone formations, but can also include lava tubes and a variety of other subsurface rock formations. Glacier caves and other ice formations are very prone to collapse from exposure to warm temperatures or running water.

In mining, the term roof fall is used to refer to many types of collapses, ranging from the fall of a single flake of shale to collapses that form sink holes that reach to the surface. However, roof falls in mining are not all accidental. In longwall mining and retreat mining, miners systematically remove all support from under large areas of the mine roof, allowing it to settle just beyond the work area. The goal in such mining methods is not to prevent roof fall and the ensuing surface subsidence, but rather to control it.

== Definition ==
"Cave in" - If the overhead ceiling collapses onto the tunnel.

=== Etymology ===
The word cave comes from the Latin "cave" or "cavēre" - meaning to beware.

== Causes ==
Cave-ins are commonly caused by leakage from old pipelines, which weakens rock and soil near the leak. For this reason, poor drainage and heavy rain or snowfall are also risk factors for cave collapse. Cave-ins can also be caused by weathering, such as repeated freezing and thawing or tree roots growing through the roof of a cave. In mining, many cave-ins are caused by poorly constructed roof support, such as excessively wide bolt spacing and insufficient support around a joint, especially in caves with a relatively thin roof. In larger falls, insufficiently supported joints and weathering are the two most common causes of cave-ins.

== Early recorded cave-in casualties ==
Lost John is one of the earliest recorded casualties from an ancient excavation. Lost John was a Native American man from the 4th century BC who was likely mining with others in Mammoth Cave at the time of his death. After gypsum, he traveled 2 miles into the cave with the only source of light being a torch. While still navigating the area, he arrived at a crevice under a large six-ton boulder held by multiple small stones. Whilst excavating gypsum from the boulder, it dislodged from its place, causing it to fall onto the man, crushing and snapping his humerus.

== Prevention ==
The most common measures taken to prevent cave-ins in excavation include keeping heavy equipment away from trench edges, inspecting trenches, and training workers on shoring.

== Geological formations ==
- Alvar structures such as on the Stora Alvaret, Öland, Sweden
- Karst limestone such as in the Madagascar dry deciduous forests

== See also ==
- Mining Subsidence
- Outburst (mining)
- Rock burst
