= Crandall Canyon Mine =

Bituminous coal mine in Emery County, Utah, U.S.

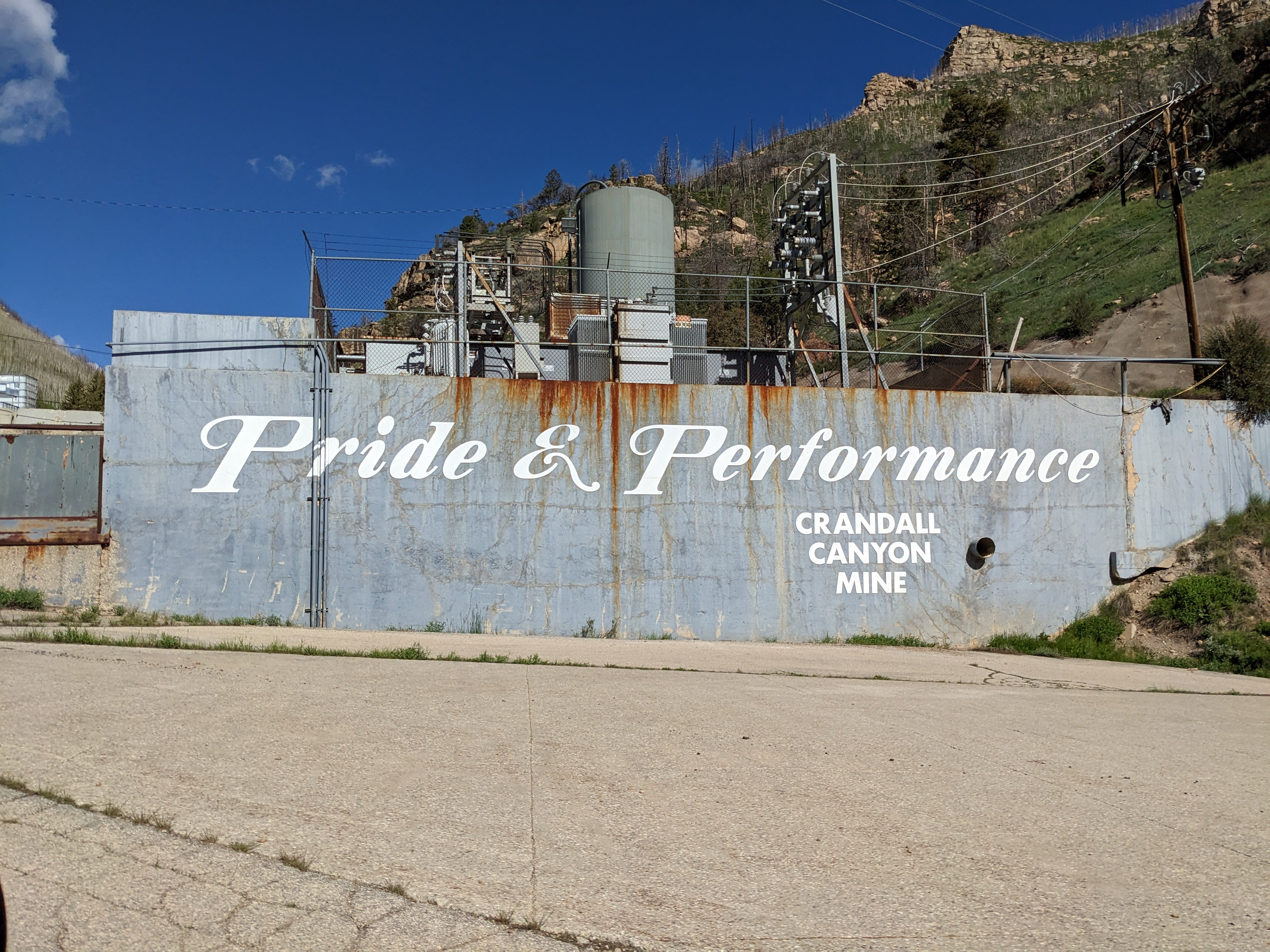
- Crandall Canyon Mine entrance sign
- Interactive map of Crandall Canyon Mine
- Products: Bituminous coal
- Opened: 1939
- Closed: 2007

The Crandall Canyon Mine, formerly Genwal Mine, was a bituminous underground coal mine in northwestern Emery County, Utah, United States. The mine made headline news when six miners were trapped by a collapse in August 2007. Ten days later, three rescue workers were killed by a subsequent collapse. The six miners were later declared dead and their bodies were never recovered.

== Location and geography ==
The Crandall Canyon Mine is located at 39°27′36″N 111°10′03.5″W (39.460000°, -111.167639°) with its entrance at an elevation of 7,835 feet (2,388 m).

The mine is located in Emery County, Utah, in the Wasatch plateau coal field. The mine is located about 140 miles (230 km) south of Salt Lake City, 34 miles (55 km) southeast of Fairview, and about 15 miles (24 km) west-northwest of Huntington. The mine is located in Crandall Canyon about 1.25 miles (2.01 km) west of its junction with the main highway road, State Route 31, which runs through Huntington Canyon.

The Manti-La Sal National Forest surrounds the mine. The mine conducts surface operations on 10 acres (40,000 m^{2}) of disturbed land within the forest. The permit area for the mine covers an area of more than 5,000 acres (20 km^{2}) utilizing fee land, federal, and state leases.

The topography in the vicinity of the mine is generally mountainous with peaks reaching above 10,000 feet (3,000 m) within a three-mile (4.8 km) radius from the mine's entrance. An unnamed peak three miles west at the head of both Crandall Canyon and Blind Canyon is at elevation 10,743 feet (3,274 m). Mill Fork Peak, located about 1.2 miles (1.9 km) south of the mine's entrance, is at elevation 9,885 feet (3,013 m). A ridge line 0.5 miles (0.8 km) north of the mine entrance reaches elevations above 9,200 feet (2,800 m). That is an offset of about 1,400 vertical feet (427 m) above the mine's entrance in the canyon below.

== Ownership and operation ==
The mine is co-owned by UtahAmerican Energy, Inc. (formerly Andalex Resources), a company with approximately US$65.1 million in annual sales, headquartered in Sandy, Utah. UtahAmerican is a subsidiary of Cleveland, Ohio based Murray Energy Corporation, owned by Robert E. "Bob" Murray. The Crandall Canyon mine is operated by Genwal Resources Inc., an operating division of UtahAmerican. The other co-owner is the Intermountain Power Agency (IPA) of South Jordan, Utah. On July 24, 2008, the U.S. government announced its highest penalty for coal mine safety violations against Genwal Resources, $1.64 million, for the 2007 collapse.

== History ==
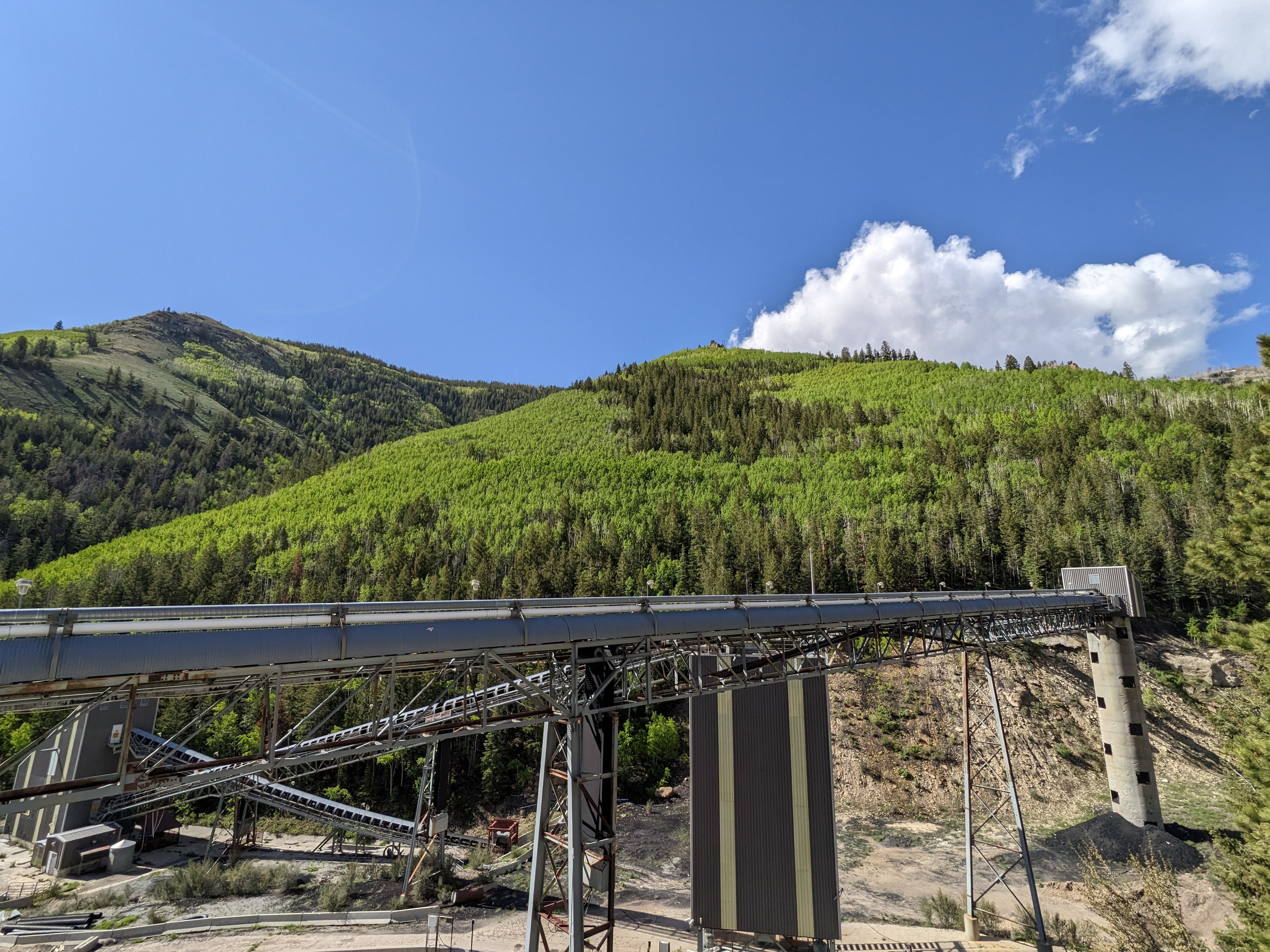
Coal conveyors after the mine's closure

Mining was conducted at the site from November 1939 to September 1955 using a room and pillar method. The Genwal Coal Company resumed mining there in 1983. At that time the mine produced between 100,000 and 230,000 tons (91,000–209,000 t) of coal each year. NEICO purchased the mine in 1989 and the next year IPA purchased 50% interest. By 1991, a continuous haulage system was used helping production surge to 1 to 1.5 million tons (900,000–1,400,000 t) each year.

Genwal Resources, Inc. acquired the mine in March 1995 and a longwall was installed the same year into the mine. The installation of the longwall nearly doubled the capacity of the mine. A new longwall was purchased two years later which increased the capacity further to 3.5 million tons (3,175,000 t) per year. To handle the increased capacity, a new loadout facility was built at the mine. Additional federal leases were expected to extend the life of the mine and new portals on its south side were slated to be installed to expand access options. Mine owners had informed the state of Utah they planned to close the mine in 2008.

=== Safety concerns ===
In 2006, the mine was cited for several safety violations, including lacking the required number of escape routes. Murray said that the safety violations were trivial and included violations such as not having enough toilet paper in the restroom. In addition, a practice referred to as retreat mining was being conducted in some portions of the mine in which the coal had been removed by room and pillar method. The extraction of material literally creates a 'room' while the ceiling is supported by the 'pillars' of coal that remain. Retreat mining refers to the common practice of removing the pillars while retreating back towards the mine entrance.

On March 10, 2007, the north barrier pillar suffered from a rock burst, in which pressure causes material from the walls and ceiling to explode inward into the excavated spaces. No miners were injured and all equipment was recovered from the affected area, but the partial collapse closed off that area and forced the mine to instead extract coal that had a higher ash content. The company depended on the low-ash coal to meet its contractual obligations, however, so on March 21 a meeting was held in which it was decided to return to the south barrier pillar. This pillar was adjacent to the north barrier pillar. The March 10 event was never officially reported to MSHA, as required by law. Robert Murray claimed to be unaware of the incident but minutes of the March 21 meeting, released in January 2008, revealed that he had in fact known about it.

== Mining accidents ==
=== Initial collapse ===
A mining accident took place on Monday, August 6, 2007, at 2:48 a.m. MDT. The mine collapsed, trapping six workers: Kerry Allred (58), Luis Hernandez (23), Brandon Phillips (24), Carlos Payan (22), Manuel Sanchez (41), and Don Erickson (50). The workers were believed to be approximately 3.4 miles (5.5 km) from the mine entrance and 1,500 feet (460 m) underground. Seismic waves from the "coal mine bump" (collapse) were reported as magnitude 3.9 to 4.0 by seismograph stations in Utah and Nevada. Initial reports questioned whether the collapse was triggered by an earthquake, but subsequent research proved the seismic readings were due to the collapse. Additional seismic activities were recorded in the days following the event.

==== Disaster response ====
Rescue teams were dispatched immediately to assess the damage to the mine and begin clearing rubble to reach the cavity. The process of clearing the rubble and reinforcing the passageways to the cavity was estimated to last between two and six weeks, but additional seismic activity and safety concerns introduced further delays.

At 9:47 pm MDT Thursday August 9, 2007, a drill bit boring a 2.5-inch (6.4 cm) hole over 1,800 feet (550 m) into the presumed location of the trapped miners reached its targeted destination. The hole was fitted with a steel pipe to allow air samples to be recovered and a microphone to be lowered, which reached the cavity location underground early Friday morning on August 10. The microphone recorded no sounds of human activity, but the crude air sample analysis from underground initially determined that the atmosphere was hospitable for life, with a sampling consisting of 20.5% oxygen, some carbon monoxide, and no traces of methane. The analysis did not, however, reveal the presence of carbon dioxide, which would be expected if the miners were still alive and breathing. Subsequent air samples, though, showed oxygen levels near 7%, at near fatal levels for human life. Initially, the subsequent sampling was thought to be consistent with a neighboring sealed-off mine cavity, and that the drill bit had simply drifted off course, but it was later confirmed that it actually did reach its targeted destination. Seemingly, the initial findings of 20.5% oxygen levels were from the bore hole itself, instead of the actual mine cavity.

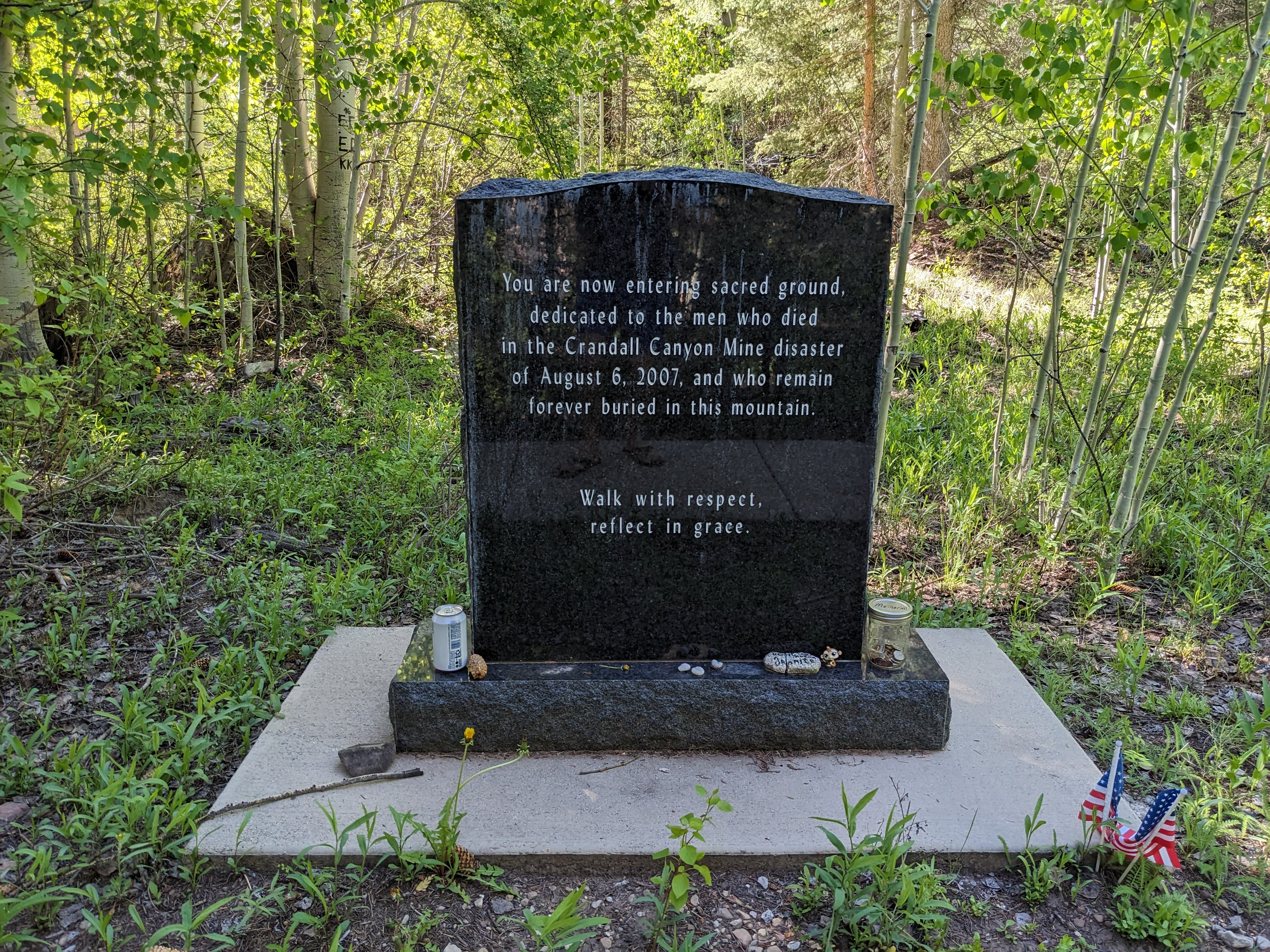
A memorial located at the mine

A concurrent rescue effort involved the creation of a nine-inch (23 cm) hole. The target was another possible location of the miners at the time of the collapse. This shaft would have allowed the delivery of food, water, and a powerful teleoperated robotic camera to scope the site. It reached the mine shaft early Saturday, August 11. The aforementioned robotic camera was lowered into the collapsed coal mine from the nine-inch-wide (230 mm) shaft, and revealed typical mining equipment but not the six missing miners, according to a federal official speaking on Sunday, August 12, 2007.

Poor lighting allowed the camera only to see about 15 feet (4.6 m) into a void at the bottom of the drill hole, far less than the 100 feet (30 m) it is normally capable of seeing, said Richard Stickler, Chief of the Mine Safety and Health Administration (MSHA).

A third bore hole was started on the evening of Sunday, August 12. The target was a ventilation area near the back of the mine. Miners are trained to go to these areas in the event that other escape routes are inaccessible. The bore hole was completed mid-day on Wednesday, August 15. Initial equipment was unable to fit through a bend in the bore hole.

Shortly before 7:00 pm MDT on August 15, 2007, vibrations were reported to have been detected within the mine. These vibrations, heard by geophones lowered into the borehole, had a duration of around five minutes, but could easily have been an animal or even a rock crumbling, said Stickler. This sound activity caused a major rethinking in the proposed location of the fourth hole that was under consideration. The fourth hole was redirected to target the noises detected in the mine about 3/4 of the distance to the third hole, roughly 800 feet (240 m) beyond the initial holes. The first two bore holes targeted the approximate location of the miners at the time of the collapse. The third bore hole targeted a ventilation area about 1,200 ft (370 m) beyond the first two holes.

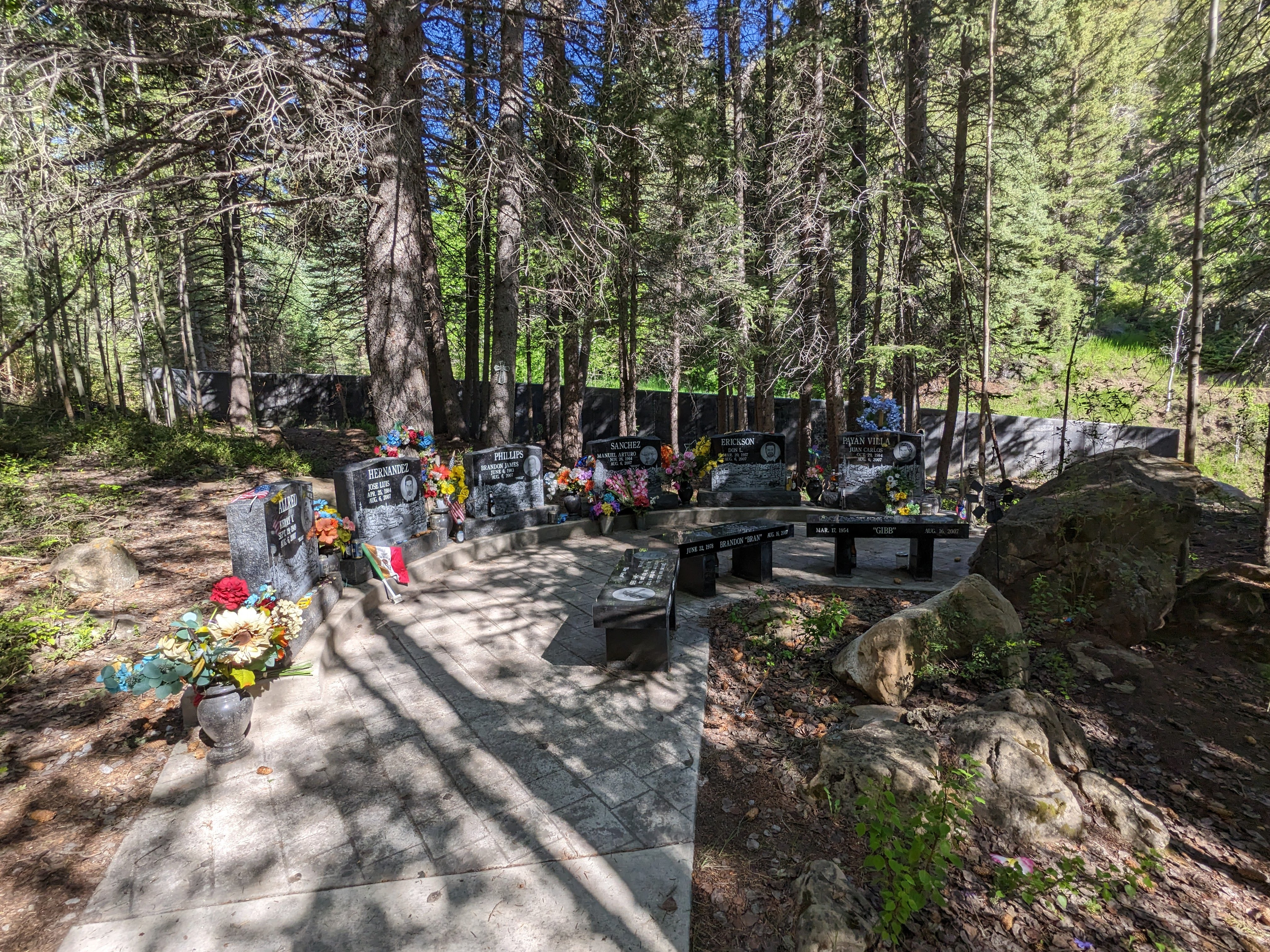
Graves for the six miners buried in the collapse and memorials for the three rescue workers killed during rescue efforts

On mid-day August 16, 2007, eleven days after the collapse, underground rescue teams were less than halfway through the rubble to the suspected location of the miners. Continued bursting of tunnel walls damaged digging equipment and required additional structural reinforcement for the safety of the crew. In the 24 hours between the August 15th and 16th reports, digging teams were only able to advance about 25 feet (7.6 m). They had advanced 826 feet (252 m) into the rubble and estimated 1,200 feet (370 m) still remained.

=== Second collapse and suspension of underground rescue efforts ===
Later on August 16, 2007, at about 6:30 pm MDT, the mine collapsed again when one of the walls of the tunnel exploded outwards, killing three rescue workers and injuring six others. All rescue workers were pulled from the mine, and it was not known whether rescue efforts underground for the trapped miners would continue. The three rescuers killed were Dale "Bird" Black (49), Brandon Kimber (29), and Gary Jensen (53). Jensen was an inspector for MSHA.

A week later, Blake Hannah, a retired inspector who used to oversee the mine said that several warning signs—including reports from miners of weakening support structures—had been ignored. "In my opinion," he said, "there were bad mining practices."

Bob Murray, owner of the mine, stated that he filed paperwork with federal regulators to permanently close and seal the Crandall Canyon mine. "Had I known that this evil mountain, this alive mountain, would do what it did, I would never have sent the miners in here. I'll never go near that mountain again," he said. Murray initially claimed the accident was due to an earthquake, stating he and his company held no responsibility.

On August 23, 2007, rescue workers bored a sixth hole into the area where the miners were last known to be working. No signs of life were detected from the sixth borehole. "There was zero void. [And they] are going through a living hell, and it's just heartbreaking" quoted Colin King of Rob Moore, vice president of Murray Energy, as he informed the families Saturday. Although the sixth hole had been called the final hole, a seventh hole was drilled on August 30, 2007. The mine cavity was filled with mud and debris, rising about 5 feet per hour (1.5 m/h).

=== U.S. Government fine ===
On July 24, 2008, MSHA announced its highest penalty for coal mine safety violations, $1.85 million (~$2.71 million in 2025), for the collapse. The government fined Genwal Resources, $1.34 million "for violations that directly contributed to the deaths of six miners last year," plus nearly $300,000 for other violations. Richard E. Stickler, the government's top mine safety official said "It was not—and I repeat, it was not—a natural occurring earthquake." The government also levied a $220,000 fine against a mining consultant, Agapito Associates, "for faulty analysis of the mine's design."

==== Timeline ====
- On Thursday, August 16, 2007:
  - At 8:55 pm MDT: CNN reported that at least six ambulances were dispatched to the mine following a "significant seismic event" or "bump". A seismic event was registered at 6:38 in that area. in which several rescuers were injured, according to a representative from the Utah Department of Natural Resources. Two helicopters were also dispatched from University of Utah Hospital in Salt Lake City. Deseret Morning News further reported that the same official, Tammy Kikuchi, stated that five people were injured, two critically.
  - At 9:22 pm MDT: AP (via MSNBC) and KSL Newsradio were reporting nine injured and with two of those critical.
  - At 9:57 pm MDT: KSTU confirmed reports of one fatality among the rescuers following a "bump" at about 6:30 pm (KSTU also reported a 1.6 magnitude seismic shock occurring) (recorded by the University of Utah also at around 6:30 pm).
  - At 10:57 pm MDT: CNN & AP reported that a second rescue worker had died.
  - At 11:40 pm MDT: CNN reported that a third rescue worker had died.
- On Friday, August 17, 2007:
  - At 1:50 am MDT: CNN reported that one injured rescue worker had been released from the hospital.
  - At 4:56 am MDT: MSNBC & CNN confirmed the three previously speculated deaths.
  - At 11:00 am MDT: There was another press conference discussing the latest developments.
- On August 17, 2007, Rich Kuczewski of the United States Department of Labor announced that there would be an indefinite suspension of the underground rescue effort, stemming from the three fatalities and nine injuries from the most recent collapse of the mine.
- On August 18, 2007, the fourth bore hole was completed. Cameras showed the area was completely collapsed, and air samples taken would not support human life. Rob Moore told reporters, "It is disappointing. And it's likely that these miners may not be found." A fifth bore hole was started on August 20. Both the monitoring equipment and continued seismic activity indicated that the mine was slowly collapsing and remained unsafe for underground rescue workers.
- On August 22, 2007, a fifth bore hole reached the mine tunnel. Video that came back from a camera lowered into the bore hole showed only about 6 inches of open space between the ceiling and rubble filling the 8-foot-high (2.4 m) tunnel.
- On August 25, 2007, a sixth bore hole reached the mine tunnel. Officials announced that the section of the mine was too small for the miners to have survived. A robotic camera—which was ordered weeks before and was finally assembled over the previous week—was planned to descend the hole on August 27. A seventh bore hole was also planned.
- On August 26, 2007, owner Bob Murray announced the closure of the Tower mine, which contains the area of the collapse. Murray announced that he would relocate workers to Illinois or Ohio if they choose, saying, "If they choose this, there will be no one laid off." Some workers complained that he was not offering enough benefits for relocated workers, and that a cost of living adjustment to local pay scales reduced their salary too much.
- On August 28, 2007, the robotic camera was unable to reach the mine through the sixth bore hole. The continuing seismic activity caused the bore hole to shift. The machine was able to descend within about 10 feet (3 m) of the mine cavity.
- On August 30, 2007, the seventh bore hole was completed. The mine cavity was filled with mud and debris, rising about 5 ft (1.5 m) per hour (1.5 m/h). Mine owners announced that there were no plans to drill additional holes, which cost about $600,000 each. They also announced plans to send the robotic camera down the fourth bore hole.
- On August 31, 2007, the robotic camera was sent down the fourth bore hole. Federal Mine Safety and Health Administration spokesman Rich Kulczewski said officials planned to drop the robot down the fourth hole despite his guess of a 90 percent chance the high-tech camera could be lost.
- On September 1, 2007, Federal officials called off the search after four weeks of failed search efforts. The option of drilling an eighth hole was not ruled out entirely but would only be considered if new information arose to justify its drilling.
- On November 21, 2007, Federal regulators revealed that Murray Energy sealed three main passageways with concrete blocks in October, leaving the bodies inside entombed. The blocks may be removed at a later date in the unlikely event there are any subsequent recovery efforts.
- On June 1, 2008, a 53-page report issued by University of Utah seismologists was released to the public. It recalculated the epicenter of the magnitude-3.9 mine collapse began near where miners were excavating coal and quickly grew to a 50-acre (200,000 m^{2}) cave-in. They also estimated the size of the collapse to be about four times larger than was thought shortly after the time of the Aug. 6, 2007, disaster.
- On July 24, 2008 the U.S. government announced its highest penalty for coal mine safety violations, $1.85 million, for the collapse.

=== Government conclusions ===
MSHA said the mine was "destined to fail" because the mining company made critical miscalculations and didn't report early warning signs. MSHA itself was faulted by the Department of Labor, of which MSHA is an agency, for lax oversight before the collapse and mismanaging the failed rescue attempt.

According to 1,400 pages of government and congressional reports, the mine was doomed, starting months before the disaster. MSHA cited Murray Energy affiliate Genwal Resources Inc. for negligence. Engineers Agapito Associates Inc. of Grand Junction, Colo., was cited for "reckless disregard." The mine failed to notify MSHA of the early danger signs, instead alerting the more industry-friendly Bureau of Land Management, when pillars started unexpectedly collapsing in March 2007. MSHA said recklessness by Agapito Associates "directly contributed to the death of nine people."

Robert Murray was also heavily criticized for his actions during the rescue attempt. The MSHA cited his volatile behavior, especially at daily briefings for family members. MSHA reported that he "frequently became very irate and would start yelling," even making young children cry. He told family members that "the media is telling you lies" and "the union is your enemy."

The Department of Labor criticized MSHA chief Richard Stickler for his handling of the rescue effort. His "obsession" for keeping a continuous log of the progress made or lost by tunneling rescuers was said to demand that the crews had to halt the rescue digging to report to him, in order to document hourly measurements.

Genwal Resources was reported to use overly aggressive mining, and failed to recalibrate their modeling of Crandall's supposed stability to match the reduction of crucial barrier pillars. In one case it miscalculated depth covers that are fundamental to safety equations at underground mines. In another, a panel of experts determined, the firm overstated the strength of support pillars by a factor of two.

== Memorials ==
A trail near the entrance of the mine now leads to a paved area which serves as an on-site memorial for the nine men killed in the 2007 disaster. Granite headstones for the six miners killed were created by American Monument to serve as markers. Granite memorial benches were also created for the three rescuers killed and serve as cenotaphs.

Another memorial to the August 2007 collapses can be found in Huntington, Utah. It is a bronze statue created by Karen Jobe Templeton, Heroes Among Us. It was unveiled on September 18, 2008, and features deep relief portraits of each of the nine men killed, and rises six feet (1.8 m) off the ground, "so that the viewer looks each miner in the eye."

== See also ==
- Wilberg Mine
- Sago Mine disaster
- List of mining disasters
