= Coal mine bump =

Type of mining industry accident

A coal mine bump (a bump, a mine bump, a mountain bump, or a rock burst) is a seismic jolt occurring within an underground mine due to the explosive collapse of one or more support pillars.

In room and pillar mining, tunnels are advanced in a rectangular pattern resembling city streets (tunnels), leaving behind blocks (pillars) of coal. To a miner, a partially completed tunnel resembles a room dug into the coal seam. As mining proceeds, the weight of rock overburden previously supported by coal mined from rooms is redistributed to pillars. If that weight exceeds the strength of a pillar, the pillar can fail by crushing or exploding. An explosive failure is called a “bump.”

In the eastern United States' coalfields, bumps are more likely when the overburden is at least 500 feet (150 m); where a strong, overlying stratum, such as sandstone, occurs near the coalbed; and with a strong, inflexible floor. In the United States, the number of deaths from bumps had dropped off dramatically since the early 1990s, but fatalities are more common in the West where mines often run deeper. Bumps are three times more likely in room-and-pillar mines, and are even more common in mines that do retreat mining, in which the pillars are removed as the miners retreat towards the mine entrance with the intent of allowing an orderly collapse of the mine.

== Incidents ==
The Springhill Mining Disaster was a bump that occurred in Springhill, Nova Scotia, Canada on October 23, 1958.

Debate over the cause of the August 6, 2007, Crandall Canyon Mine disaster, which took place 1,800 feet (550 m) beneath the surface, raised public awareness about coal mine bumps. Seismologists at the University of Utah and the University of California, Berkeley concluded that an associated 3.9 magnitude temblor was likely caused not by an earthquake, but by the collapse itself. The mine's owner, Robert E. Murray, adamantly disagreed.
