= Century Mine (coal mine) =

Coal mine in Ohio

- Location within Ohio
- Location: Beallsville, Belmont County, Ohio; 39.8948°N 81.0234°W
- Products: Bituminous coal
- Type: Underground
- Closed: June 15, 2022
- Company: Murray Energy

The Century Mine was an underground coal mine in Belmont County, Ohio owned by American Energy Corporation, a subsidiary of Murray Energy. It was the last remaining mine in the county before it was shut down in 2022. The mine produced around 5 million tons of coal per year. Unlike other mines in Ohio, Century Mine used longwall technology that enabled it to operate with relatively fewer workers. The mine had applied for a permit to extend operations by five years in 2017 and expected reserves to last for another 35 years.

Century Mine was the site of a fatal accident in 2011 and another in 2013. In 2010, the Mine Safety and Health Administration fined Murray Energy $173,987 for safety violations at Century Mine. The company challenged the fine, lowering the amount to $102,373.

Republican presidential candidate Mitt Romney held a rally at the mine on August 14, 2012, as part of his campaign. The mine was shut down for the day, causing workers to lose pay. The company and the Romney campaign blamed each other for the closure. A group of miners complained to a local radio talk show that they were forced to attend the rally and feared they would be fired otherwise. Company officials confirmed that they had told workers attendance was required. Still, they later maintained that attendance was voluntary. The Romney campaign agreed that attendance appeared to be voluntary. In response, the Democratic group ProgressOhio filed a complaint with the Federal Election Commission, which began an investigation that was later dropped.

In 2015, the mine was temporarily idled. According to the company, this was due to "new EPA regulations and the increased utilization of natural gas". The mine's sales were not affected. Out of 650 workers, 425 were laid off for two weeks.

The mine was shut down on June 15, 2022. The mine issued a WARN notice stating that all 106 workers would be permanently laid off at the time. They were not part of a union and did not have bumping rights. State and county job services mobilized to provide workers with new employment opportunities.
