= SLAPP Suits =

Last Week Tonight with John Oliver segment

- Last Week Tonight with John Oliver segment
- John Oliver performing his musical number "Eat Shit, Bob!" at the end of the segment
- Episode no.: Season 6 Episode 29 (segment)
- Directed by: Paul Pennolino; Christopher Werner
- Written by: Dan Gurewitch; Jeff Maurer; Jill Twiss; Juli Weiner
- Presented by: John Oliver
- Original air date: November 10, 2019
- Running time: 26 minutes

Guest appearances
- Brian d'Arcy James as Lawyer; Jordan Gelber as Hotdog Vendor

Episode chronology
← Previous "Voting Machines"	Next → "The Census"

"SLAPP Suits" is a segment of HBO's news-satire television series Last Week Tonight with John Oliver, focusing on strategic lawsuits against public participation (SLAPP). It first aired on November 10, 2019, as part of the twenty-ninth episode of the series's sixth season. The episode marked British-American comedian and host John Oliver's response to winning a SLAPP defamation lawsuit against him initiated by American mining businessman Robert E. Murray. The lawsuit began in 2017, after Oliver heavily criticized Murray and his company, Murray Energy, in a segment concerning the coal-mining industry in the United States. Murray claimed in his lawsuit that Oliver had carried out a character assassination against him, but the case was dismissed in under a year, and an appeal by Murray Energy was unsuccessful. During the lawsuit, the American Civil Liberties Union filed an amicus brief that was widely covered due to its sarcastic humor.

In "SLAPP Suits", Oliver discussed the outcome of the lawsuit and the damaging effects of similar lawsuits, giving an overview of Murray's other SLAPPs and their potential harm to independent journalism. Oliver ended the twenty-six-minute segment with the musical number "Eat Shit, Bob!" in celebration of winning the lawsuit, invoking his right under the First Amendment to the United States Constitution to make negative jokes and comments about people and corporations. The title of the number references a check returned by a Murray Energy miner on the grounds that it incentivized unsafe mining practices, with the words "Eat Shit Bob" written on the check. The segment and musical number were lauded by critics and nominated for six Primetime Emmy Awards, with the episode winning one award for Outstanding Technical Direction, Camerawork, Video Control for a Series, and the musical number winning another for Outstanding Picture Editing for Variety Programming.

== Background ==
=== 2017 Last Week Tonight coal mining segment ===
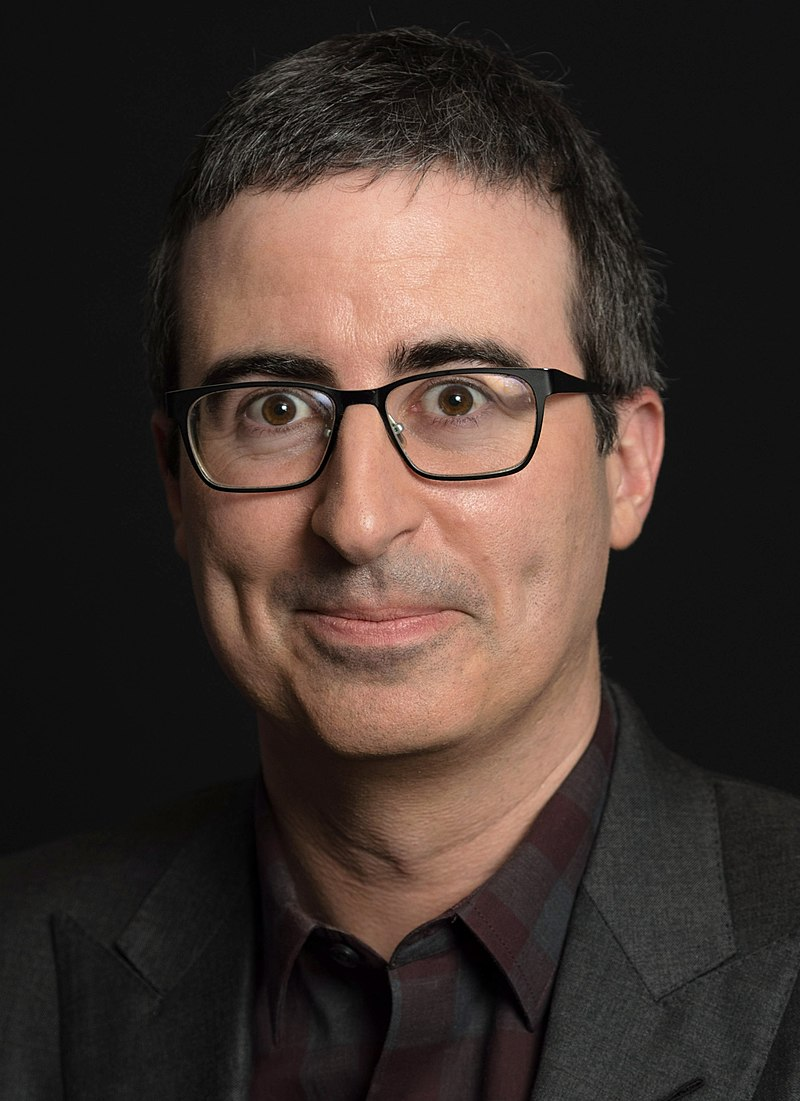
John Oliver in 2016

On June 18, 2017, John Oliver hosted a Last Week Tonight segment titled "Coal", focusing on practices in the American coal-mining industry. Oliver began the piece by showing President Donald Trump's affinity for the coal industry, including shots of him during his 2016 presidential campaign in a coal miner's hat and delivering a speech in which he told the miners to prepare to work their "asses off" when he became president. Oliver then introduced Robert E. Murray, CEO of Murray Energy, an outspoken critic of President Barack Obama during his tenure for perceived incompetence and aggression towards the coal industry.

Oliver goes on to explain that when Murray Energy was contacted about the piece, his show received a cease-and-desist letter that instructed them not to engage in "any effort to defame, harass, or otherwise injure Mr. Murray or Murray Energy", and that Murray Energy had sued others before. Oliver ignored this letter, proceeding to call Murray a "geriatric Dr. Evil" who was "on the same side as black lung" and to talk about other errors in Murray Energy's mining practices, focusing particularly on the Crandall Canyon Mine collapse that killed nine people. The mine was operated by Genwal Resources, Inc., an affiliate of Murray Energy. Oliver pointed out that while Murray argued that the collapse was the fault of an earthquake, the federal government concluded that it was the fault of unsafe mining practices.

Oliver also highlighted another story before ending the segment: when Murray Energy introduced a bonus program for coal miners, they were told that they could return their checks if they felt the program incentivized unsafe practices. Two miners complied, returning checks for small amounts with the words "Kiss My Ass Bob" (all capitalized) and "Eat Shit Bob" written on them. Oliver also referenced a satirical article in a journal of the United Mine Workers, alleging that Murray shared an anecdote in which he was told to start a coal mining corporation by a talking squirrel; the company denied the story. Drawing on these two incidents, Oliver ended the segment by introducing a squirrel mascot known as "Mr. Nutterbutter" (played by Noel MacNeal) who taunted Murray by holding up an oversized check for "three acorns and eighteen cents" made out to "Eat Shit, Bob!".

=== Defamation lawsuit ===
On June 21, 2017, three days after "Coal" aired, Marshall County Coal Company and other companies chaired by Murray filed a lawsuit against Oliver, HBO, and others associated with Oliver in a West Virginia Circuit Court claiming defamation. The complaint alleged that Oliver carried out a "meticulously planned attempt to assassinate the character of and reputation of Mr. Robert E. Murray and his companies". The plaintiffs criticized Oliver's coverage of the Crandall Canyon Mine collapse, reiterating their claim that the primary collapse was caused by an earthquake, rather than unsafe mining practices on the part of the Murray Energy subsidiary. The company sought monetary damages, as well as a gag order on broadcasting the piece or airing it online. An HBO spokesperson expressed confidence in Last Week Tonight, and said that they did not believe that "anything in the show this week violated Mr. Murray's or Murray Energy's rights".

On February 21, 2018, the case was dismissed, with the judge agreeing with HBO's arguments that Murray Energy had failed to state a valid claim. Murray Energy appealed to the Supreme Court of Appeals of West Virginia, but four of the five justices on that court were impeached for unrelated corruption, overspending, and lack of oversight charges; the fifth justice resigned. The defamation lawsuit was later dropped, while Murray Energy was filing for bankruptcy. Oliver also revealed that he had mentioned one of the justices on the court in a segment a few years prior; specifically, he had joked that the chief justice on the court, Allen Loughry, referred to his penis as "The Gavel".

==== Amicus curiae from the ACLU ====
In August 2017, while the lawsuit was ongoing, the American Civil Liberties Union (ACLU) chapter in West Virginia filed an amicus brief on behalf of HBO. The brief was noted by news outlets for its snarky, humorous tone, unusual in a legal document; it featured section headings such as "You Can't Sue People for Being Mean to You, Bob" and "A Brief History of Plaintiffs' Attempts to Chill Speech by Abusing the Legal System". Written by Jamie Lynn Crofts, the paper argued that Oliver's segment did not air any speech that violated Murray Energy's rights, as Oliver's statements were protected by the First Amendment as satirical humor—although Crofts also quipped that "with regard to the Dr. Evil remark, it should be noted that truth is an absolute defense to a claim of defamation". The brief claimed Murray Energy was using the court as a vehicle to suppress free speech, arguing that this lawsuit "threatens the fundamental right of the media to criticize public figures and speak candidly on matters of public concern".

Due to the media coverage of the brief, Murray Energy filed a response, asking the court to disregard the ACLU's brief on the basis that they did not fully disclose a financial conflict of interest with Oliver's show. The company pointed to a Last Week Tonight segment titled "President-Elect Trump", aired five days after the 2016 presidential election. In the segment, Oliver encouraged viewers to donate to causes perceived to be left-leaning such as Planned Parenthood, the NAACP Legal Defense and Educational Fund, The Trevor Project, the Center for Reproductive Rights, and the International Refugee Assistance Project. The company argued that this encouragement caused an "immediate surge of millions of dollars in donations to the ACLU". Reuters, however, contended that Murray Energy did not provide suitable evidence for this claim; the response cited three news articles that did not support this argument, instead attributing the rise in donations to the result of the presidential election in general. The response also criticized the tone of the ACLU's submission, arguing that the brief's "vulgar language" displayed its unfitness for consideration.

== Segment ==
External videos
- Last Week Tonight with John Oliver: Coal (HBO) on YouTube
- Last Week Tonight with John Oliver: SLAPP Suits (HBO) on YouTube

On November 10, 2019, John Oliver aired a segment on his show, titled "SLAPP Suits", discussing strategic lawsuits against public participation, including the lawsuit brought against him by Murray.

Oliver began the segment by summarizing the legal proceedings, including a clip of Murray on Fox Business responding to the original segment. Oliver noted that despite winning the case, his show's libel insurance tripled in addition to paying more than $200,000 in attorneys' fees. Oliver highlighted nine lawsuits from Murray Energy against news outlets and journalists who have published negative content about Murray, including a lawsuit against HuffPost, who called him an "extremist coal baron", as well as The New York Times. Oliver stated that Murray Energy had also sued those who may not be fortunate enough to have the backing of a large company like HBO or libel insurance, and suggested that Murray's reputation for litigiousness may have succeeded in its goal of silencing criticism. In particular, Oliver contended that Murray's habits led to the relative silence in the press on two sexual harassment lawsuits against him.

Concluding the section discussing Murray's lawsuits, Oliver speculated that despite the segment being vetted by HBO's lawyers (who he joked were "getting very tired of us"), the episode would likely lead to another lawsuit and that he would stand behind his works if it were to happen. Oliver cited the idea that "loose, figurative language" that cannot be understood as factual is protected under the First Amendment in order to create a musical number to end the episode.

=== Musical number ===
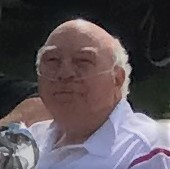
Murray in 2019

For the final portion of the segment, Oliver staged a five-minute musical number titled Eat Shit, Bob! after the miner's returned check. Initially set in his studio, it began with Oliver singing slowly that "even though he'll threaten legal Armageddon, we have just one tiny thing to say..." and then he gave the finger and exclaimed "Bob Murray can go fuck himself today!" Oliver then introduced the "Suck My Balls Bob Dancers”, who moved the setting to the streets of New York City as they and an increasing cast recounted fictional anecdotes of Murray committing outlandish and horrifying acts. They jokingly sang that he spat on the Mona Lisa, launched puppies into outer space, perpetrated the assault of Nancy Kerrigan, carried out the assassination of Archduke Franz Ferdinand and started World War I, dipped his testicles into the water of a hot dog cart, cut off Vincent van Gogh's ear, advised Adolf Hitler to quit painting and "find a new career", masturbates to Schindler’s List, sold drugs to Bill Cosby and served as Jeffrey Epstein's prison guard, inserted candy into his rectum in an M&M’s store, was the unidentified Zodiac Killer, and had sexual intercourse with squirrels. The segment ends with Oliver and the dancers in Times Square, reminding Murray that "it doesn't count as slander 'cuz it's way too weird.", before culminating with the number's title.

Oliver centered portions of the song on his First Amendment rationale, saying that "we made up these anecdotes, they're silly and insane" and "If we discuss Bob Murray in a way no reasonable person could construe as factual, we can say whatever the fuck we like!" Mr. Nutterbutter made a reappearance as part of a barbershop quartet in squirrel costumes, and Brian d'Arcy James appeared in the role of HBO's legal counsel.

== Reaction and impact ==
Reception of "SLAPP Suits" was widely positive. The A.V. Club said that the episode was a demonstration in "why rich assholes really shouldn't sue John Oliver", and referred to the musical number as "glorious" and "over-the-top". A year later, The A.V. Club would cite the musical number as an example of "a troll's powers ... turned into a force for good". Outlets were also receptive to Oliver's stance on behalf of those vulnerable to SLAPP lawsuits. Slate commented that just because Oliver gave an "impassioned speech standing up for all the small outlets and independent activists bullied into silence by SLAPP lawsuits", that does not mean he "has matured even a little bit". Slate also compared the segment to eight other recent comedy clips on a graph called an "EvisceRater", rating it as funnier and more informative than the other eight segments. The Mary Sue agreed with Oliver, stating that Murray's SLAPP suits create a "culture of fear", but points out that "of course, this is John Oliver we're talking about and 'culture of fear' is basically his Bat-Signal". An editorial from the Charleston Gazette-Mail said that there was "a lesson in John Oliver roasting Bob Murray" in that it leads to the question of why states like West Virginia lack anti-SLAPP laws.

A 2020 West Virginia University paper by Shine Sean Tu and Nicholas Stump referenced the defamation lawsuit as a case that "exhibits the classic anatomy of a SLAPP suit". The paper argued that Murray's lawsuit was indeed typical for a SLAPP lawsuit, in that a powerful corporation or individual used the legal system, particularly through a defamation lawsuit, in order to scare Oliver into silence. The "most appropriate classification for the Oliver case", the paper contended, "is that of a SLAPP suit whose aims are to impede constitutional free speech rights". The lawsuit was also cited in a 2020 law textbook titled The Law of Public Communication, which similarly outlined it as a standard SLAPP and credited Oliver for bringing attention to the topic.

"Eat Shit, Bob!" won a Primetime Emmy Award for Outstanding Picture Editing for Variety Programming, and was nominated for Outstanding Original Music and Lyrics. The episode itself won an award for Outstanding Technical Direction, Camerawork, Video Control for a Series, and was nominated in the categories of Outstanding Production Design for a Variety, Reality or Competition Series and Outstanding Sound Mixing for a Variety Series or Special. Episode directors Christopher Werner and Paul Pennolino received a nomination for Outstanding Directing for a Variety Series.

Murray died in October 2020 due to a long-term lung illness. The Daily Beast remembered him as a "Coal Magnate and John Oliver Nemesis", highlighting the controversy between the two as a significant source of notoriety. The show would reference it in 2026 when using Mr. Nutterbutter in a parody of the Buc-ee's logo to mock said company starting lawsuits against businesses with supposedly similar logos, with Oliver stating "Mr. Nutterbutter currently has a perfect record in court, and the last guy who sued us over him is technically dead now."
