= David Zatezalo =

American coal industry executive (born 1955)

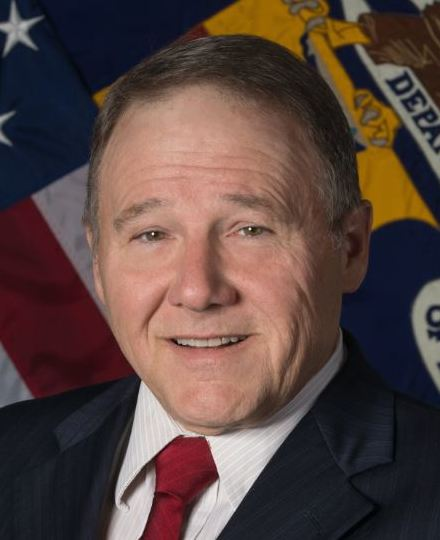

9th Assistant Secretary of Labor for Mine Safety and Health
- In office November 30, 2017 – January 20, 2021
- President: Donald Trump
- Preceded by: Joe Main
- Succeeded by: Jeannette J. Galanis (acting)

Personal details
- Born: David George Zatezalo; June 7, 1955 (age 70)
- Spouse: Jo Lynn
- Education: Ohio University (BS); West Virginia University (MBA)

David George Zatezalo (born June 7, 1955) is an American coal industry executive who served as the Assistant Secretary of Labor for Mine Safety and Health in President Donald Trump's administration, where he headed the Mine Safety and Health Administration.

== Career ==
=== Coal industry ===
In 1974, Zatezalo began his mining career with Consolidation Coal Company, where he worked as a United Mine Workers laborer. He became a foreman and was later named general superintendent for Southern Ohio Coal Company and general manager of the Windsor Coal Company. Zatezalo has served as vice president of operations of American Electric Power's Appalachian mining operations, as general mine manager for BHP, and as president of Hopedale Mining.

From 2007 to 2014, Zatezalo was chairman of the coal company Rhino Resources. Rhino Resources clashed with federal regulators when the Obama administration tried to boost industry-wide mine safety enforcement. The company received pattern of violations warning letters from MSHA in 2010 and 2011, during a time when agency executive Joe Main was increasing enforcement following the Upper Big Branch Mine disaster.

=== Mine Safety and Health Administration ===
In September 2017, Zatezalo was nominated by President Donald Trump to become the next head of the Mine Safety and Health Administration. Robert E. Murray urged him to come out of retirement to take the role. Zatezalo's first task will be to shepherd a relaxed inspection rule for hard rock mines.

Zatezalo's nomination was received in the Senate and referred to the Committee on Health, Education, Labor, and Pensions on September 5, 2017. Ahead of his confirmation hearings, Democrats asked for details of the warnings at the Eagle #1 mine. Senator Joe Manchin (D-WV) said he would oppose Zatezalo's nomination. Zatezalo's confirmation hearing was October 4, 2017. The committee voted 12–11 in favor of advancing his nomination. Zatezalo's nomination was secured by a 52–46 vote on November 15.

Under Zatezalo, the MSHA indicated it would reexamine standards for rock and coal dust and diesel emissions in mines. In December 2017, the agency asked for public comment on procedures that would be less burdensome on the industry.
