= American Mining Congress =

American association od mining groups

The American Mining Congress (AMC) was an association of mining groups and is noted for initiatives that promoted the interest of the mining industry. It later merged with the National Coal Association (NCA) to form the National Mining Association in 1995.

== History ==
The American Mining Congress was founded in 1897 as a trade association. AMC, which was initially known as the International Mining Congress, drew its members from operators, owners, prospectors, and miners. On the heels of the organization of mining companies in the United States, the association functioned as an interest group addressing the issues that affect mining industry after the changes to American mining laws since 1872.

In 1995, AMC merged with the NCA, one of the oldest trade groups in the United States to form the National Mining Association (NMA) in 1995. NMA addresses the impact of environmental policies such as the Kyoto Protocol and the EPA proposed regulations. Until its merger with the NCA, the American Mining Congress was considered one of the four most influential interest groups in terms of size and scope in the coal industry along with the National Coal Association, the National Independent Coal Operators Association, and the Mining and Reclamation Council. AMC represented all mining industries, including hard rock mining and coal.

AMC also staged international mining and coal trade shows.

== Issues ==
The AMC was known for supporting the original draft of a 1962 bill defining wilderness protection laws about mineral extraction, opposing the reformed bill put forth by the EPA. The AMC argued that the legislative initiatives had different prescriptions as to the period of mineral leasing.

The 1987 judgment for American Mining Congress v. EPA is considered one of the most critical decisions covering recycling. In this decision, the U.S. Court of Appeals for the D.C. Circuit reversed EPA's definition of solid waste, and the court also held that not all recycling is "in-process"; hence, there are those that are beyond the agency's jurisdiction.

AMC was a party in a significant 1993 case regarding agency oversight and administrative law in American Mining Congress v. Mine Safety & Health Administration. Herein, AMC questioned the Mine Safety & Health Administration's authority to draw medical conclusions based on X-rays provided to the agency. The court ruled in favor of the Mine Safety & Health Administration, affirming administrative agencies' right to enact interpretive regulation rules.
