= American Mining Congress v. Mine Safety & Health Administration =

- Court: United States Court of Appeals for the District of Columbia Circuit
- Full case name: American Mining Congress v. Mine Safety & Health Administration
- Argued: November 10, 1992
- Decided: June 15, 1993
- Citations: 995 F.2d 1106; 302 U.S. App. D.C. 38, 1993 O.S.H.D. (CCH) ¶ 30,096

Holding
- The Program Policy letters of the mine Safety and Health Administration which stated the agency's position that certain X - Ray readings were qualified as diagnoses of lung diseases within the meaning of agency regulations were interpretive rules under the Administrative Procedure Act.

Court membership
- Judges sitting: Stephen F. Williams, David B. Sentelle, A. Raymond Randolph

Case opinions
- Majority: Williams, joined by a unanimous court

Laws applied
- Administrative Procedure Act

Keywords
- Administrative Law

American Mining Congress v. Mine Safety & Health Administration, 995 F.2d 1106 (1993) is a decision by the United States Court of Appeals for the District of Columbia Circuit concerning the issues of administrative law and agency oversight.

== Overview ==
In this case, the American Mining Congress, a miners' organizations, petitioned for review of Program Policy Letters (PPL) of Mine Safety and Health Administration, stating agency's position that certain x-ray readings qualified as diagnoses of lung disease within meaning of agency reporting regulations.

== Holding ==
The Court was called upon to determine whether the PPL on the issue of x-rays was an interpretive rule, in which case it would be valid, or a legislative rule, in which case it would be invalid (for not being enacted in accordance with the Administrative Procedure Act). The Court used a four-part test to determine whether the rule was legislative (an affirmative answer to any one means the rule is legislative):

1. Whether in the absence of the rule there would not be an adequate legislative basis for enforcement action or other agency action to confer benefits or ensure the performance of duties;
2. Whether the agency has published the rule in the code of federal regulations;
3. Whether the agency has explicitly invoked its general legislative authority;
4. Whether the rule effectively amends a prior legislative rule. Subsequent caselaw has minimized the importance of the second factor.
