= Beallsville, Ohio =

- Village
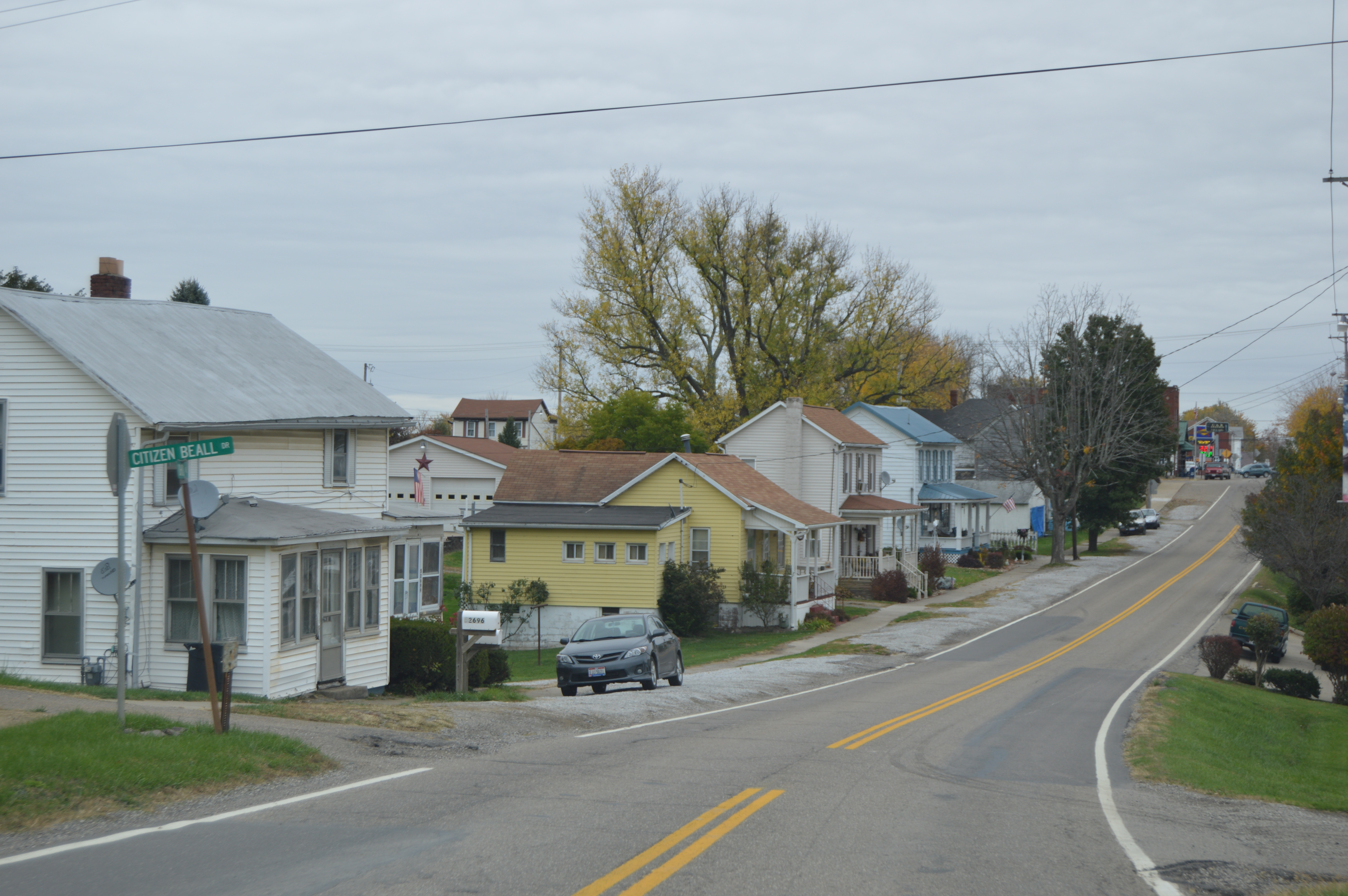
- Ohio Avenue

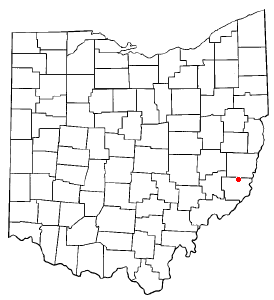
- Location of Beallsville, Ohio

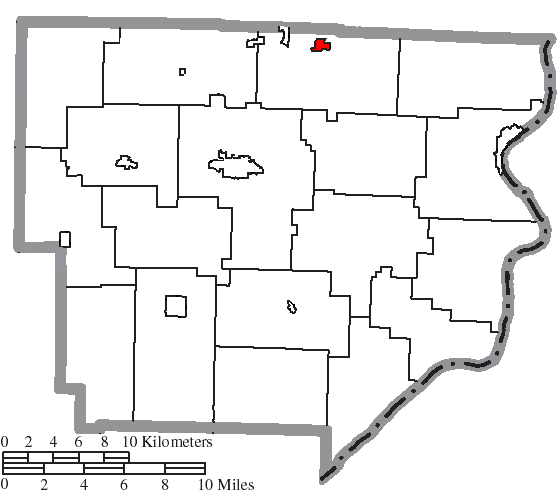
- Location of Beallsville in Monroe County
- Coordinates: 39°50′56″N 81°02′07″W
- Country: United States
- State: Ohio
- County: Monroe
- Township: Sunsbury

Area
  - Total: 0.36 sq mi (0.94 km^{2})
  - Land: 0.36 sq mi (0.94 km^{2})
  - Water: 0 sq mi (0.00 km^{2})
- Elevation: 1,253 ft (382 m)

Population (2020)
  - Total: 355
  - Estimate (2023): 347
  - Density: 978.4/sq mi (377.77/km^{2})
- Time zone: UTC-5 (Eastern (EST))
  - Summer (DST): UTC-4 (EDT)
- ZIP code: 43716
- Area code: 740
- FIPS code: 39-04542
- GNIS feature ID: 2398057

Beallsville (/ˈbɛlzvɪl/ BELLZ-vil) is a village in Monroe County, Ohio, United States. As of the 2020 census, the population was 355. The village gained national attention by losing more than 1% of its population killed in action in the Vietnam War, the worst per-capita loss of life experienced by any place in the country.

Two former coal mines owned by Murray Energy, Powhatan No. 6 mine and Century Mine, are located near Beallsville.

== History ==
During the period of active American participation in the Vietnam War in the 1960s, Beallsville gained brief notoriety for the loss of five of its citizens in the conflict — a traumatic rate of loss for the village of fewer than 500 residents that was estimated at 75 times the national average. The plight of the community drew wire service coverage and was the subject of a lengthy illustrated spread in the glossy left-wing magazine Ramparts. Moved by the magnitude of the loss, Congressman Clarence Miller made a formal request to Secretary of Defense Melvin Laird and President Richard Nixon to withdraw the village's other six servicemen from combat, which was denied.

A sixth of the village's sons fell in combat on March 9, 1969, cementing the community's tragic distinction of having the highest percentage rate of loss in the Vietnam War of any town in America.

== Geography ==
According to the United States Census Bureau, the village has a total area of 0.36 square miles (0.93 km^{2}), all of it land.

== Demographics ==
Historical population
Census	Pop.	Note	%±
1830	50		—
1840	100		100.0%
1850	276		176.0%
1870	324		—
1880	391		20.7%
1890	512		30.9%
1900	554		8.2%
1910	564		1.8%
1920	555		−1.6%
1930	479		−13.7%
1940	450		−6.1%
1950	410		−8.9%
1960	441		7.6%
1970	452		2.5%
1980	601		33.0%
1990	464		−22.8%
2000	423		−8.8%
2010	409		−3.3%
2020	355		−13.2%
2023 (est.)	347	▼	−2.3%
U.S. Decennial Census

=== 2010 census ===
As of the census of 2010, there were 409 people, 174 households, and 113 families living in the village. The population density was 1,136.1 inhabitants per square mile (438.7/km^{2}). There were 196 housing units at an average density of 544.4 per square mile (210.2/km^{2}). The racial makeup of the village was 97.8% White and 2.2% from two or more races.

There were 174 households, of which 31.6% had children under the age of 18 living with them, 43.7% were married couples living together, 13.2% had a female householder with no husband present, 8.0% had a male householder with no wife present, and 35.1% were non-families. 30.5% of all households were made up of individuals, and 12.6% had someone living alone who was 65 years of age or older. The average household size was 2.35 and the average family size was 2.90.

The median age in the village was 39.8 years. 22.5% of residents were under the age of 18; 9.1% were between the ages of 18 and 24; 25.9% were from 25 to 44; 29.1% were from 45 to 64; and 13.4% were 65 years of age or older. The gender makeup of the village was 48.9% male and 51.1% female.

=== 2000 census ===
As of the census of 2000, there were 423 people, 171 households, and 114 families living in the village. The population density was 1,145.5 inhabitants per square mile (442.3/km^{2}). There were 186 housing units at an average density of 503.7 per square mile (194.5/km^{2}). The racial makeup of the village was 98.35% White, 0.24% Pacific Islander, and 1.42% from two or more races. Hispanic or Latino of any race were 0.24% of the population.

There were 171 households, out of which 32.2% had children under the age of 18 living with them, 49.7% were married couples living together, 11.7% had a female householder with no husband present, and 33.3% were non-families. 29.2% of all households were made up of individuals, and 14.6% had someone living alone who was 65 years of age or older. The average household size was 2.47 and the average family size was 3.05.

In the village, the population was spread out, with 24.3% under the age of 18, 12.5% from 18 to 24, 28.6% from 25 to 44, 22.9% from 45 to 64, and 11.6% who were 65 years of age or older. The median age was 33 years. For every 100 females there were 85.5 males. For every 100 females age 18 and over, there were 83.9 males.

The median income for a household in the village was $25,893, and the median income for a family was $34,063. Males had a median income of $26,750 versus $20,938 for females. The per capita income for the village was $20,672. About 11.9% of families and 18.1% of the population were below the poverty line, including 15.0% of those under age 18 and 13.6% of those age 65 or over.

== Notable people ==
- Merriman Colbert Harris, Civil War soldier and Methodist Episcopal Church Missionary Bishop
- Dustin Nippert, professional baseball player
