= American Consolidated Natural Resources =

American coal mining company

- Type: Private
- Industry: Coal mining
- Founded: 1988; 38 years ago
- Headquarters: St. Clairsville, Ohio
- Key people: Robert E. Murray (founder)
- Products: Coal
- Website: acnrinc.com

American Consolidated Natural Resources, previously known as Murray Energy, is a US-based coal mining company. It is the fourth largest coal producer in the country, and the largest privately owned coal company. (Note: The three larger coal US coal companies, Peabody Energy, Arch Coal, and Cloud Peak Energy, are all publicly traded rather than privately owned.) Founded in 1988 by Robert E. Murray, the company filed for bankruptcy in 2019. The company gained notoriety following the collapse of the Crandall Canyon Mine in 2007, following a number of citations and fines for safety practices at the site.

According to The Guardian, Murray Coal was responsible for 0.15% of global industrial greenhouse gas emissions from 1988 to 2015.

== History ==
Murray Energy was founded by Robert E. Murray in 1988 through the acquisition of the Powhatan No. 6 mine in Alledonia, Ohio. The company was established in nearby St. Clairsville, Ohio. The Powhatan mine, which closed in 2016, was the only mine operated by a Murray Energy Corporation independent operating subsidiary that is unionized. The company also operated the nearby Century Mine, which closed in 2022. Murray Energy Corporation produces approximately 30 million tons of bituminous coal each year and employs approximately 3,000 people in the United States.

In 2013, the company acquired Consol Energy Inc, consisting of five mines and a fleet of more than 600 barges and other ships.

According to the company's website, as of 2019, they employed some 7,000 workers in the US and South America. The company is headquartered in St. Clairsville, Ohio. It is the largest privately owned coal company in the US, and fourth largest overall, with the three larger coal companies all being publicly traded rather than privately owned.

=== Crandall Canyon Mine collapse ===
In August 2007, six miners were trapped at the Crandall Canyon Mine in Utah, of which Murray Energy's independent operating subsidiary UtahAmerican Energy had been a part-owner for 12 months. Prior to the collapse, the Crandall Canyon Mine had received 64 violations and $12,000 in fines. At the time, Murray Energy's owner, Robert, claimed that the safety violations were trivial and included violations such as not having enough toilet paper in the restroom. However, some news agencies reported troubling violations at other Murray operations. CNN specifically cited Murray's Illinois Galatia mine, which had almost 3,500 safety citations in the prior two and a half years.

On July 24, 2008, the U.S. government's Mine Safety and Health Administration (MSHA) announced its highest penalty for coal mine safety violations, $1.85 million, for the collapse. The government fined Genwal Resources $1.34 million "for violations that directly contributed to the deaths of six miners last year," plus nearly $300,000 for other violations. The government also levied a $220,000 fine against a mining consultant, Agapito Associates, "for faulty analysis of the mine's design."

Following the Crandall Canyon tragedy, the Mine Safety and Health Administration also was faulted by its parent agency, the U.S. Department of Labor, both for lax oversight before the collapse and for its handling of a haphazard rescue effort that left three more people dead. An independent review of MSHA's role in Crandall Canyon by retired MSHA managers Earnest Teaster and Joseph Pavlovich, found that the agency failed to properly consider bounce activity in the mine prior to approving the mining plan, failed to properly evaluate the roof control plan and failed to follow established mine rescue protocols at all times at Crandall Canyon Mine. Specifically, the authors wrote that, "MSHA's failure to adequately evaluate the roof control plans contributed to the August 6 accident." An independent review of MSHA's actions at Crandall Canyon also faults the agency for failing to control access to the mine, concluding that "MSHA improperly allowed media representatives and family members to enter the rescue area, and allowed an unlimited number of persons underground during the rescue operation."

=== Bankruptcy ===
Murray Energy announced in October 2019 that the company was filing for Chapter 11 bankruptcy, and that Robert Murray would step down as CEO, but remain with the company as chairman of their board. Murray was to be replaced by his nephew Robert Moore, formerly of Murray Energy subsidiary Foresight Energy, which is not part of the bankruptcy. Murray Energy emerged from bankruptcy on September 16, 2020, selling almost all of its assets to a new holding company, now owned by its former creditors: American Consolidated Natural Resources Inc. Robert Murray was Chairman of the Board of Directors for the new company until his death in October 2020.

=== Funding of climate change denial ===
The bankruptcy filing revealed that funding had been given by the company to a number of organisations that promote climate change denial. These include the Committee for a Constructive Tomorrow, the Center for the Study of Carbon Dioxide and Global Change, the International Climate Science Coalition, the Heartland Institute, and the Competitive Enterprise Institute.
