= UtahAmerican Energy =

American mining company

UtahAmerican Energy, Inc. (formerly Andalex Resources), is a Bituminous coal underground coal mine and lignite surface mining company, headquartered in Sandy, Utah. UtahAmerican is a subsidiary of Cleveland, Ohio based Murray Energy Corporation. UtahAmerican is a company with approximately $65.1 million (USD) in annual sales, and 428 employees and was started in 1996.

== Crandall Canyon ==
The company operates the Crandall Canyon Mine, a bituminous coal, underground coal mine in northwestern Emery County, Utah, about 15 miles (24 km) west north-west of Huntington.

On Monday, August 6, 2007, at 2:48 A.M., the mine collapsed, trapping 6 workers inside. The workers are approximately 3.4 miles (5.5 km) from the mine entrance and 1500 feet (457 m) underground. The collapse registered recorded seismic waves in magnitude 3.9 to 4.0, by seismograph stations of the University of Utah. Emery County, the state's No. 2 coal-producer, was also the site of a fire that killed 27 people in the Wilburg mine in December 1984.

== Fines ==
On March 20, 2008, the company was fined $420,300 by Federal authorities for "flagrant violations" at a mine in Price, Utah.

== Mines ==
Mines operated by UtahAmerican and managed by Genwal Resources Inc.:

- Aberdeen mine (produced in excess of 1.8 million mt (2.0 million st) of coal in 2006)
- Centennial mine
- Crandall Canyon Mine
- Lila Canyon Mine
- Pinnacle mine (produced in excess of 1.8 million mt (2.0 million st) of coal in 2006)
- Smokey Hollow mine
- West Ridge mine
- Wildcat Loadout mine
