= Outburst (mining) =

Violent underground phenomenon

An outburst is the sudden and violent ejection of coal, rock, and gas from a coal face and surrounding strata in an underground coal mine. Outbursts can be a very serious events, possibly even resulting in fatalities.

== Effects of outbursts ==
Outbursts may range in severity from being barely noticeable, to causing the destruction of an entire mining panel, and throwing pieces of machinery weighing tens of tonnes several metres. An outburst at Tahmoor Colliery, in New South Wales, Australia, in June 1985 ejected 350 tonnes of coal and rock and over 3000 cubic metres of gas, killing one miner. An outburst at the nearby South Bulli Colliery in 1991 killed three miners. An outburst at Westcliff Colliery in January 1994 ejected 300 tonnes of coal and rock and killed one miner.

== Predisposing factors ==
Several factors predispose certain coal seams to being outburst-prone. These include:

- Coal seam gas content (measured in m^{3} per tonne) - generally, for a given coal seam gas composition, the higher the gas content, the higher the risk
- Geological structures, in particular faults, dykes, and mylonite (reddish brown powdered coal) zones
- Coal permeability (the less permeable the coal seam, the more prone to outbursts)
- Coal seam gas composition - for a given coal seam gas content (in m^{3} per tonne), the seam will be much more susceptible to outbursts if the coal seam gas is predominantly carbon dioxide, as opposed to the case where the coal seam gas is predominantly methane.
- The compressive strength of coal - high-strength coal seams appear to be more prone to outbursts. This may be because low-strength coal tends to deform in and around the face area as mining occurs, resulting in stress relaxation (see below).
- The stress regime at the face - high stress on and around the mining face can close up the cleats and pores in the coal seam. This can result in a steep coal seam gas pressure gradient into the seam, (as opposed to a low stress environment where the coal seam gas drains freely into the face area, resulting in a low seam gas pressure gradient). As mining progresses, this pressure can be violently released, resulting in an outburst.

The statistical results show that the primary factor in coal and gas outbursts is crustal stress (P), followed by sturdiness coefficient (f). The coal seam gas content (W) affect affects coal and gas outbursts as the least important factor.

== Outburst management ==
Outburst management primarily focuses on the prevention of outbursts by pre-draining the gas from coal seams prior to mining. The aim of gas drainage is to lower the gas content of the seam below a certain threshold value, at which time it is considered safe to mine the seam. These threshold values should vary depending on the coal seam and coal measure being mined. Since the introduction of threshold values, not a single fatality due to an outburst has been recorded in Australia.

Gas drainage is achieved by drilling boreholes into the seam in advance of mining. Gas liberated from the seam into the boreholes is transported out of the mine via a pipe range.

Where standard gas drainage techniques are ineffectual, mine operators have a number of options. These may include:

- Remote mining - mining is carried out by remote control.
- Grunching - the sequential drilling, blasting, and loading out of the coal face, as opposed to the conventional mechanised method of mining.
- Induction shotfiring - using a charge (explosive) to test the face and induce an outburst if one is imminent. The explosion would have the effect of fracturing the face and relieving the stress on the face, transferring it deeper into the seam.
- Not mining that part of the seam - (Lives are worth more than coal.)

Mining under "bomb squad" or outburst conditions is no longer considered acceptable, since this method still presents a fatal risk to at least one miner. "Bomb squad" is a special set of operating conditions that used to be adopted when it was anticipated that an outburst could occur. Under "bomb squad" conditions, the following working methods would apply:

- Minimal manning at the face - particularly during the cutting of coal, only one man at a time was allowed at the face (the continuous miner driver)
- Armoured cabins were built on continuous mining machines - these cabins were thought to be able to protect the operator in the event of an outburst. (This was subsequently proven incorrect.)
- Operators wore full-face masks, connected to a compressed air supply. (This was also found ineffectual in preventing fatalities.)

== See also ==
- Rock burst
