= Dick Stickler =

Richard Stickler
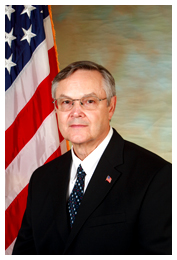
- Born: 1940 (age 85–86); West Virginia
- Education: Fairmont State University, B.A.
- Occupation: Former acting Assistant Secretary of Labor for the Mine Safety and Health Administration (MSHA)

Richard E. Stickler (born 1940) served as acting Assistant Secretary of Labor for the Mine Safety and Health Administration (MSHA) between October 16, 2006 and October 21, 2009.

He was born in West Virginia in 1940 and graduated from Fairmont State University with a bachelor's degree in general engineering. He worked for BethEnergy Mines Inc., a division of Bethlehem Steel, for over thirty years. From 1997 until 2003 he was the director of the Pennsylvania Bureau of Deep Mine Safety. He presided over the Quecreek Mine Rescue in Somerset County, Pennsylvania on 24 July 2003.

Stickler was nominated to the role of Assistant Secretary of Labor in charge of MSHA by President George W. Bush in September 2005. The appointment was strongly opposed by the United Mine Workers, a major worker union in the mining industry, and eight of the nine miners rescued following the Quecreek disaster.

The nomination also faced significant resistance in the United States Senate, with Democratic Sens. Robert Byrd and Jay Rockefeller (both of West Virginia) successfully corralling widespread opposition from both Democratic and Republican senators. In remarks at the time, Senator Rockefeller noted that Stickler had overseen "some of the most dangerous, most frequently cited for safety violations in the entire industry. In fact, his mines had a rate of preventable accidents that were 3 times the national average". Senator Rockefeller, who had recently marshalled the MINER Act through the Senate to strengthen mine safety regulation, noted that Stickler had testified to Congress that he did not believe more legislation was necessary but rather that enforcement was an issue.

Despite resistance from the Senate, and with the nomination being returned twice to his desk unaffirmed, President Bush later appointed Stickler as a recess appointment in October 2006. The appointment, which was met by vocal criticism from members of the Senate - expired on December 31, 2007. On January 4, 2008, President Bush again appointed Stickler as acting head of MSHA, and again renominated him to take the position on a permanent basis.

Stickler reached public notoriety as a result of his role in co-ordinating the rescue effort to find six miners trapped by a collapse at Crandall Canyon Mine in August 2007. In a report released in March 2008, the Inspector General of the Labor Department said that MHSA was negligent in protecting workers at the mine. The investigation into the cause of the disaster, including the loss of three would-be rescuers, is still ongoing, with completion expected sometime in the summer of 2008.
