= Retreat mining =

Removal of pillars in room and pillar mining

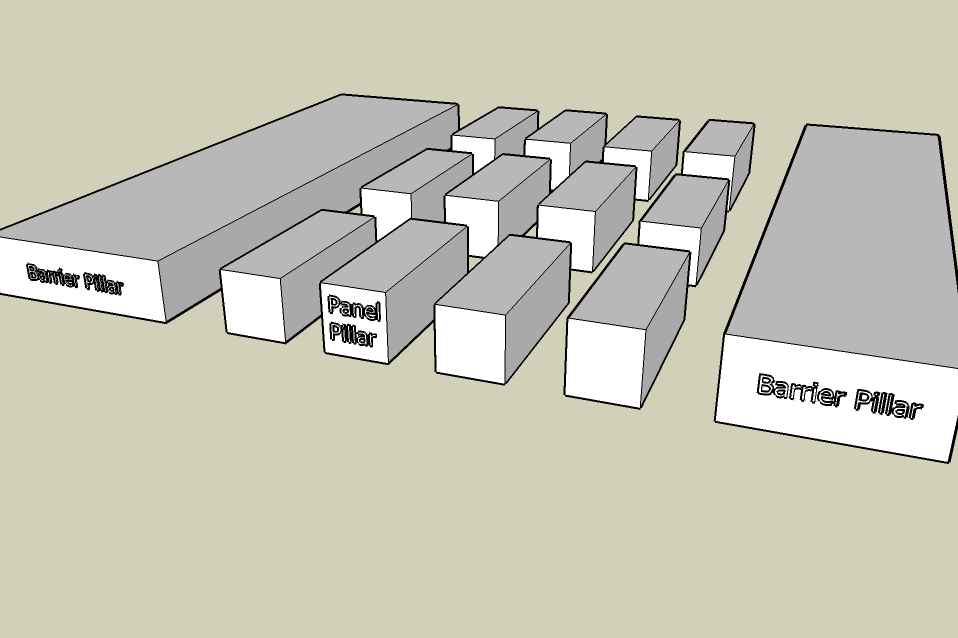
General layout of a room-and-pillar mine.

Retreat mining is the removal of pillars in the underground mining technique known as room and pillar mining.

In the first phase of room and pillar mining, tunnels are advanced into the coal or ore body in a rectangular pattern resembling city streets. Pillars are left between tunnels to support the weight of the overburden. The first phase is known as "mining on the advance," from the entrance toward the further reaches of the reserve.

In the second phase, once advance mining has been completed, pillars are removed "on the retreat." Removing or "pulling" pillars begins far from the entrance and proceeds toward the entrance. As the pillars are removed, the mine collapses because nothing remains to support the roof and overburden. Removing pillars causes stresses within the mine to shift and must be planned and executed carefully to reduce danger to miners and control the amount of stress exerted on remaining pillars and the mine floor.

Tunnels only make up about 15% of the reserve, so during advance mining, only about 15% of the coal or ore is removed. During retreat mining, an additional 75% of coal or ore may be removed because pillars make up much more of the reserve, bringing the total recovery of the resource to as much as 90%.

Retreat mining is a particularly dangerous form of mining: according to the Mine Safety and Health Administration (MSHA), pillar recovery mining has been historically responsible for 25% of American coal mining deaths caused by failures of the roof or walls, even though it represents only 10% of the coal mining industry.

Retreat mining was being used at the Crandall Canyon Mine where a collapse in August 2007 trapped six miners.

== See also ==
- Longwall mining
- Mountaintop removal mining
- Hydraulic fracturing
- Directional drilling
