= Face (mining) =

Mining term for the surface where the mining work is advancing

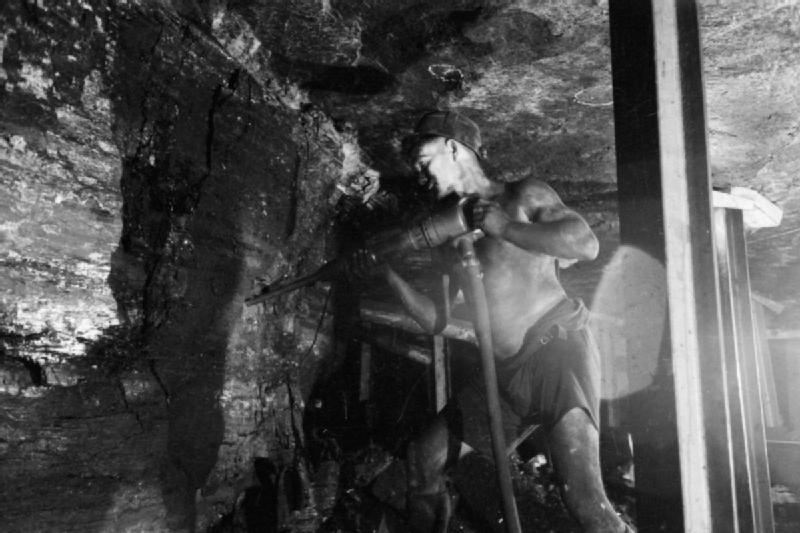
miner in 1942

In mining, the face is the surface where the mining work is advancing. In surface mining it is commonly called the pit face, while in underground mining a common term is mine face.

Accordingly, face equipment is the mining equipment used immediately at the mine face used for removal and near-face transportation of the material: cutting machines, loaders, etc.
