= Rock burst =

Spontaneous, violent fracture of rock

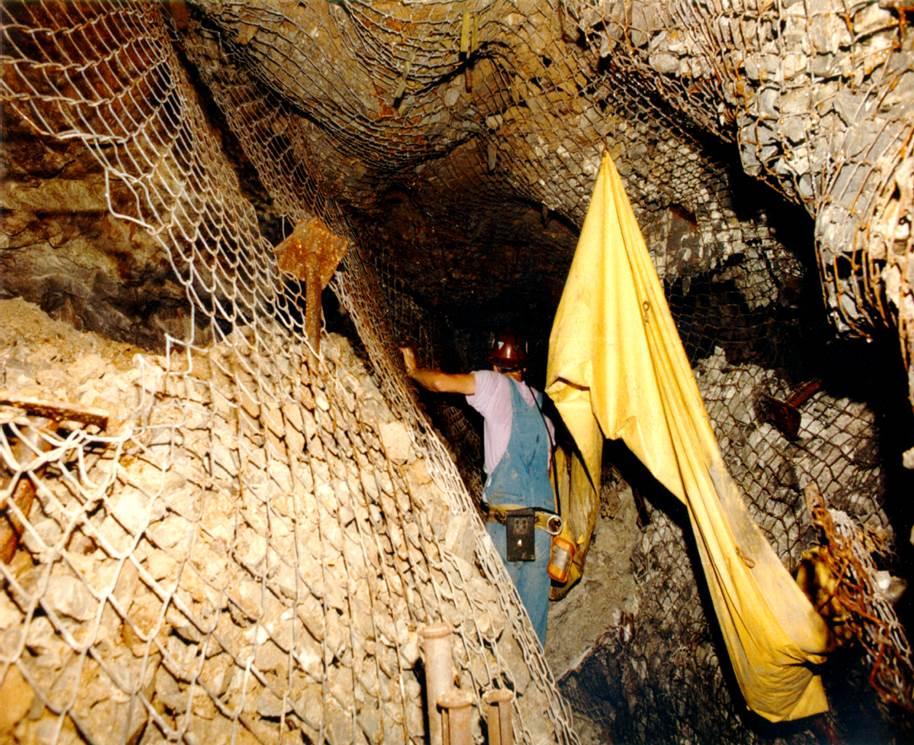
Rock burst damage at a deep US mine

A rock burst is a spontaneous, violent failure of rock that can occur in high-stress mines. Although mines may experience many mining-related seismic events, only the tremors associated with damage to accessible mine workings are classified as rock bursts. The opening of mine workings relieves neighboring rocks of tremendous pressure, which can cause the rock to fail explosively or trigger abrupt movement in nearby geological structures. Rock bursts are a serious hazard;

They are a problem in South Africa, and kill a large number of miners each year.

== Details ==
Rock bursts result from brittle fracturing of rock, causing it to collapse rapidly with violent spalling of rock that is approximately 100 to 200 tonnes, or more. This release of energy reduces the potential energy of the rock around the excavation. Another explanation is that the changes brought about by the mine's redistribution of stress trigger latent seismic events, deriving from the strain energy produced by its geological aspects.

The likelihood of rock bursts occurring increases as the depth of the mine increases. Rock bursts are also affected by the size of the excavation (the larger the more risky), becoming more likely if the excavation size is around 180 m and above. Induced seismicity such as faulty methods of mining can trigger rock bursts. Other causes of rock bursts are the presence of faults, dykes, or joints.

== Mitigation ==
Approaches for dealing with rock bursts can be divided into two categories: tactical measures, which can be taken locally and at short notice in response to a heightened level of rock burst hazard, and strategic measures, which must be integrated into the mine design process and long-term planning.

=== Tactical measures ===
A number of tactical measures have been used successfully to reduce rockburst hazards. They include:

1. Using support systems that absorb energy and deform without breaking. Even where these systems suffer damage, they are often able to limit falls of ground and permit access where other systems fail completely.
2. Using destress blasting can reduce rock burst hazards, particularly highly stressed brittle rock. Destress holes can be efficiently integrated into conventional rounds. Destress blasting of large volumes, however, can be more problematic.
3. Slowing the rate of extraction will often reduce the amount of seismicity in relation to tonnage mined and may actually prevent bursting under some conditions.

=== Strategic measures ===
Strategic measures that have been used successfully include:

1. A properly planned sequence of stoping for the whole ore body should be adopted and followed as closely as possible.
2. The merging of large excavations at depth should be avoided.
3. Pillars, or volumes of rock in between excavations, should be eliminated or reduced to a minimum.
4. Parallel veins should be stoped singly, the hanging wall vein first (footwall vein first if underhand mining).
5. Where veins branch, stoping should begin at the intersection and then progress away from the intersection one branch at a time.
6. Where possible, stoping should proceed away from a fault or other plane of weakness.
7. Mined-out areas should be filled, and filling should proceed concurrently with extraction and be kept as close to the face as possible.

== See also ==
- 2025 El Teniente mining accident
- Outburst (mining)
- Coal mine bump
