= Mine Safety and Health Administration =

Agency of the United States Department of Labor

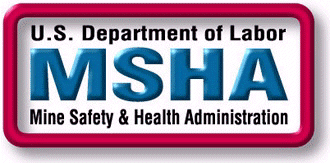

Agency overview
- Formed: 1977
- Jurisdiction: Federal Government of the United States
- Headquarters: Crystal City, Virginia, U.S.
- Employees: 1,631
- Annual budget: $379 million (2021 budget)
- Agency executive: Wayne Palmer, Assistant Secretary of Labor for Mine Safety and Health
- Parent agency: United States Department of Labor
- Website: www.msha.gov

The Mine Safety and Health Administration (MSHA) (/ˈɛmʃə/) is a small agency of the United States Department of Labor which administers the provisions of the Federal Mine Safety and Health Act of 1977 ("Mine Act") to enforce compliance with mandatory safety and health standards as a means to eliminate fatal accidents, to reduce the frequency and severity of nonfatal accidents, to minimize health hazards, and to promote improved safety and health conditions in the nation's mines. MSHA carries out the mandates of the Mine Act at all mining and mineral processing operations in the United States, regardless of size, number of employees, commodity mined, or method of extraction. David Zatezalo was sworn in as Assistant Secretary of Labor for Mine Safety and Health, and head of MSHA, on November 30, 2017. He served until January 20, 2021. Jeannette Galanais served as Acting Assistant Secretary by President Joe Biden on February 1, 2021 until Christopher Williamson took office on April 11, 2022.

MSHA is organized into several divisions. The Coal Mine Safety and Health division is divided into 12 districts covering coal mining in different portions of the United States. The Metal-Nonmetal Mine Safety and Health division covers six regions of the United States.

== History ==
=== Early legislation ===
In 1891, Congress passed the first federal statute governing mine safety. The 1891 law was relatively modest legislation that applied only to mines in U.S. territories, and, among other things, established minimum ventilation requirements at underground coal mines and prohibited operators from employing children under 12 years of age.

In 1910, Congress established the Bureau of Mines as a new agency in the Department of the Interior. The Bureau was charged with the responsibility to conduct research and to reduce accidents in the coal mining industry, but was given no inspection authority until 1941, when Congress empowered federal inspectors to enter mines. In 1947, Congress authorized the formulation of the first code of federal regulations for mine safety.

The Federal Coal Mine Safety Act of 1952 provided for annual inspections in certain underground coal mines, and gave the Bureau limited enforcement authority, including power to issue violation notices and imminent danger withdrawal orders. The 1952 Act also authorized the assessment of civil penalties against mine operators for noncompliance with withdrawal orders or for refusing to give inspectors access to mine property, although no provision was made for monetary penalties for noncompliance with the safety provisions. In 1966, Congress extended coverage of the 1952 Coal Act to all underground coal mines.

The first federal statute directly regulating non-coal mines did not appear until the passage of the Federal Metal and Nonmetallic Mine Safety Act of 1966. The 1966 Act provided for the promulgation of standards, many of which were advisory, and for inspections and investigations; however, its enforcement authority was minimal.

=== Coal Act ===
The Coal Mine Safety and Health Act of 1969, generally referred to as the Coal Act, was more comprehensive and more stringent than any previous federal legislation governing the mining industry. The Coal Act included surface as well as underground coal mines within its scope, required two annual inspections of every surface coal mine and four at every underground coal mine, and dramatically increased federal enforcement powers in coal mines. The Coal Act also required monetary penalties for all violations, and established criminal penalties for knowing and willful violations. The safety standards for all coal mines were strengthened, and health standards were adopted. The Coal Act included specific procedures for the development of improved mandatory health and safety standards, and provided compensation for miners who were totally and permanently disabled by the progressive respiratory disease caused by the inhalation of fine coal dust pneumoconiosis or "black lung".

In 1973, the Secretary of the Interior, through administrative action, created the Mining Enforcement and Safety Administration (MESA) as a new departmental agency separate from the Bureau of Mines. MESA assumed the safety and health enforcement functions formerly carried out by the Bureau to avoid any appearance of a conflict of interest between the enforcement of mine safety and health standards and the Bureau's responsibilities for mineral resource development. (MESA was the predecessor organization to MSHA, prior to March 9, 1978.)

=== Mine Act and creation of MSHA ===
More recently, Congress passed the Federal Mine Safety and Health Act of 1977, the legislation which currently governs MSHA's activities. The Mine Act amended the 1969 Coal Act in a number of significant ways, and consolidated all federal health and safety regulations of the mining industry, coal as well as non-coal mining, under a single statutory scheme. The Mine Act strengthened and expanded the rights of miners, and enhanced the protection of miners from retaliation for exercising such rights. Mining fatalities dropped sharply under the Mine Act from 272 in 1977 to 45 in 2014. The Mine Act also transferred responsibility for carrying out its mandates from the Department of the Interior to the Department of Labor, and created MSHA, which is a large independent agency that functions in business oversight. Additionally, the Mine Act established the independent Federal Mine Safety and Health Review Commission to provide for independent review of the majority of MSHA's enforcement actions.

Congress passed the Mine Improvement and New Emergency Response Act (MINER Act) in 2006. The MINER Act amended the Mine Act to require mine-specific emergency response plans in underground coal mines; added new regulations regarding mine rescue teams and sealing of abandoned areas; required prompt notification of mine accidents; and enhanced civil penalties.

=== Respirator regulations ===
MSHA inherited regulatory power of respirators from the Bureau of Mines, which was shared with NIOSH until the passage of 42 CFR Part 84, which withdrew MSHA's involvement from the approval process of respirators.

== Modern regulations ==
Modern mining regulation in the United States is carried out by MSHA and governed by The Federal Mine Safety and Health Act of 1977 and MSHA's Program Policy Manual Volume III.

On January 27, 2012 as required under the Dodd–Frank Wall Street Reform and Consumer Protection Act, the Securities and Exchange Commission adopted final rules which require covered SEC-reporting issuers that are "operator(s)" (or that has a subsidiary that is an "operator") of a "coal or other mine" to disclose certain mine safety violations, citations and orders and related matters for each coal or other mine that they operate. Covered mine "operator(s)" are also required to file a current report on Form 8-K to disclose the receipt of certain orders and notices from the U.S. Labor Department's Mine Safety and Health Administration (MSHA) related to a coal or other mine that they operate.

=== Accidents and accident reporting ===
Mine operators are required by law to report all mining accidents within 15 minutes of when the operator knew or should have known about the accident.

Immediately reportable accidents and injuries are:

1. A death of an individual at a mine;
2. An injury to an individual at a mine which has a reasonable potential to cause death;
3. An entrapment of an individual for more than thirty minutes;
4. An unplanned inundation of a mine by a liquid or gas;
5. An unplanned ignition or explosion of gas or dust;
6. An unplanned mine fire not extinguished within 30 minutes of discovery;
7. An unplanned ignition or explosion of a blasting agent or explosive;
8. An unplanned roof fall at or above the anchorage zone in active workings where roof bolts are in use; or, an unplanned roof or rib fall in active workings that impairs ventilation or impedes passage;
9. A coal or rock outburst that causes withdrawal of miners or which disrupts regular mining activity for more than one hour;
10. An unstable condition at an impoundment, refuse pile, or culm bank which requires emergency action in order to prevent failure, or which causes individuals to evacuate an area; or, failure of an impoundment, refuse pile or culm bank;
11. Damage to hoisting equipment in a shaft or slope which endangers an individual or which interferes with use of the equipment for more than thirty minutes; and
12. An event at a mine which causes death or bodily injury to an individual not at the mine at the time the event occurs.

Statistical analyses performed by MSHA show that between 1990 and 2004, the industry cut the rate of injuries (a measure comparing the rate of incidents to overall number of employees or hours worked) by more than half and fatalities by two-thirds following three prior decades of steady improvement.

=== MSHA inspections ===
MSHA employs nearly one safety inspector for every four coal mines. Underground coal mines are thoroughly inspected at least four times annually by MSHA inspectors. In addition, miners can report violations, and request additional inspections. Miners with such concerns for their work safety cannot be penalized with any threat to the loss of employment.

Additionally, the Mine Safety and Health Act authorizes the National Institute for Occupational Safety and Health (NIOSH), part of the Centers for Disease Control and Prevention under the U.S. Department of Health and Human Services to develop recommendations for mine health standards for the Mine Safety and Health Administration; administer a medical surveillance program for miners, including chest X-rays to detect pneumoconiosis (black lung disease) in coal miners; conduct on-site investigations in mines; and test and certify personal protective equipment and hazard-measurement instruments.

== See also ==
- Title 30 of the Code of Federal Regulations
- Category:Mining disasters in the United States
- American Mining Congress v. Mine Safety & Health Administration
- Through-the-earth mine communications
- Mining in the United States
