= Upper Big Branch Mine disaster =

2010 coal mine explosion in Raleigh County, West Virginia, U.S.

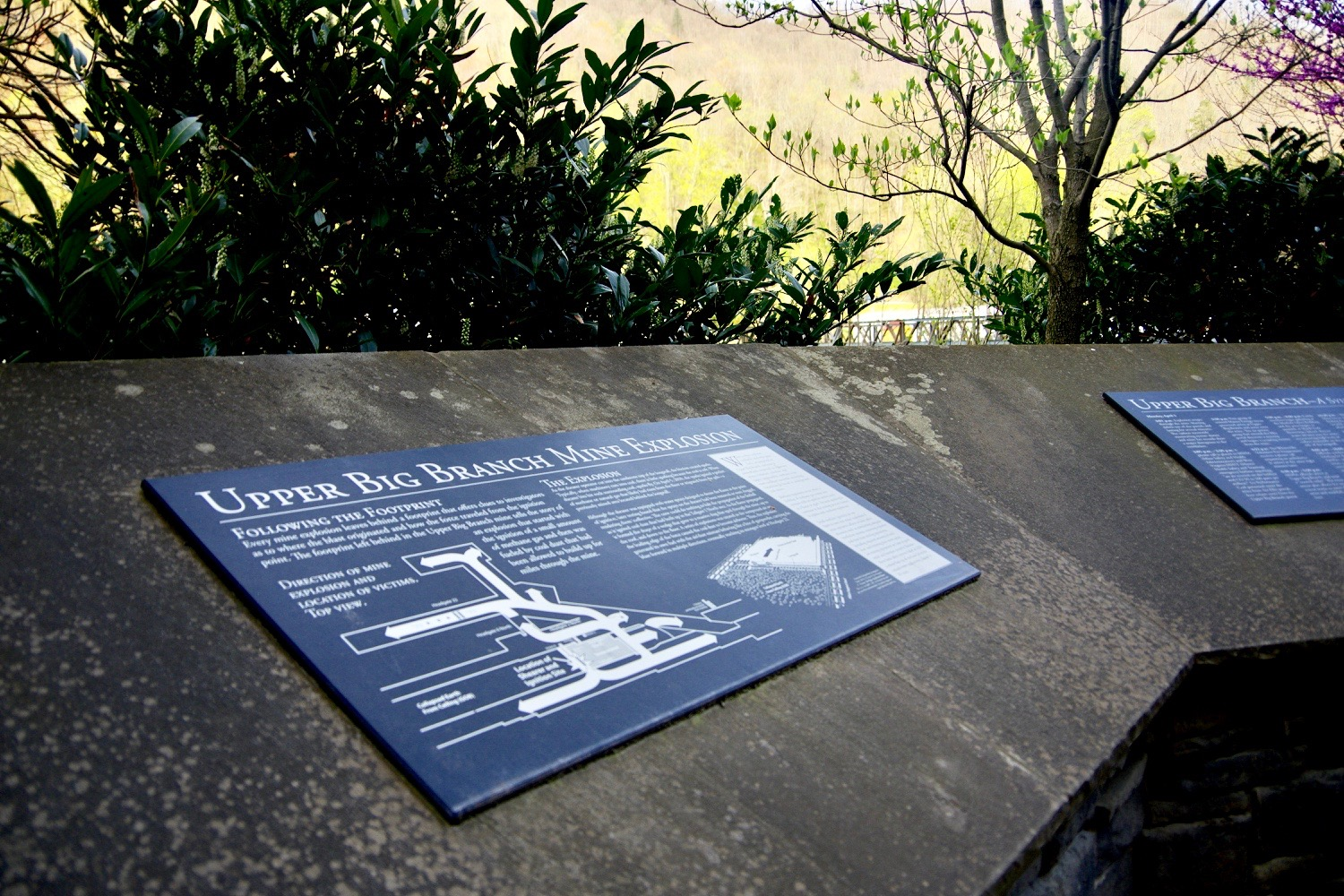
- Upper Big Branch Miners Memorial interpretive sign
- Date: April 5, 2010; 16 years ago
- Location: Raleigh County, West Virginia at Massey Energy's Upper Big Branch coal mine located in Montcoal; 37.937256°N 81.543572°W
- Cause: Coal Mine explosion
- Deaths: 29
- Injuries: 3
- Convicted: Don Blankenship
- Convictions: Conspiracy to violate federal mine safety regulations
- Sentence: 1 year in federal prison $250,000 fine

The Upper Big Branch Mine disaster occurred on April 5, 2010, roughly 1,000 feet (300 m) underground in Raleigh County, West Virginia at Massey Energy's Upper Big Branch coal mine located in Montcoal. 29 miners were killed in the explosion, and 3 were injured. The coal dust explosion occurred at 3:27 pm. The incident was the worst in the United States since 1970, when 38 miners were killed at Finley Coal Company's No. 15 and 16 mines in Hyden, Kentucky. A state funded independent investigation later found Massey Energy directly responsible for the blast.

The Mine Safety and Health Administration (MSHA) released its final report on December 6, 2011, concluding that flagrant safety violations contributed to the explosion. It issued 369 citations at that time, assessing $10.8 million in penalties. Alpha Natural Resources, which had bought Massey Energy in 2011, settled its corporate criminal liabilities with the U.S. Attorney for $209 million. Investigation of possible personal criminal liability continues, with one former superintendent, Gary May, pleading guilty in March 2012, and "confess[ing] to conspiring to 'impede the [MSHA]'s enforcement efforts.'" In April 2012, coal producer Alpha Natural Resources Inc. (ANR), the owner of the mine at the time, said it will permanently close its Upper Big Branch mine in West Virginia.

Former Massey Energy CEO Don Blankenship was convicted in 2015 of a misdemeanor conspiring to willfully violate safety standards and was sentenced to one year in prison. He was found not guilty of charges of securities fraud and making false statements.

== Explosion ==
The explosion occurred at 3:27 pm local time (19:27 UTC) on Monday, April 5, 2010, at the Upper Big Branch South Mine near the community of Montcoal, about 30 miles (48 km) south of Charleston. The mine was operated by the Performance Coal Company, a subsidiary of Massey Energy. The explosion ignited from an unknown source with high methane levels being a contributing causal factor. Twenty-five men were initially identified as killed. Four days later, four missing men were found dead for a total of 29 deaths. Investigators later faulted Massey Energy for failure to properly maintain its ventilation systems, which allowed methane levels to increase to dangerous amounts. It was initially reported that 12 miners had died with more than a dozen unaccounted for. At that time, it was reported 21 miners were injured during the blast. Boone County emergency, as well as surrounding counties' emergency response teams, were dispatched, including over 20 ambulances and three helicopters. One miner was evacuated by helicopter, and at least two others were evacuated by ambulance. Massey said the mine was equipped with rescue chambers stocked with first-aid kits and oxygen tanks. The two safety chambers in the mine were inflatable units made by Strata Safety Products with air, water, sanitary facilities, and food sufficient to support more than a dozen miners for about four days; they could possibly support four miners for longer than 96 hours, though only if any miners managed to reach a chamber after the blast. Seven bodies were recovered from the mine on the first day.

One survivor reported he first felt a rush of air, followed by a blast of hurricane-force winds. He encountered flying debris as he escaped the mine. The blast was heard and felt for miles. A miner working at another site approximately seven miles away from the blast said when it happened, "it was just like your ears stopped up, you couldn't hear" and it was like being in the middle of a tornado. "Rail lines were twisted like pretzels" according to rescue workers, and "mining machines were blown to pieces."

== Rescue and recovery mission ==
Emergency crews initially gathered at one of the portals for the Upper Big Branch Mine in Birchton, West Virginia, about 2 miles north of Montcoal and 3 miles south of Whitesville on Route 3 (on the west side of the road). Kevin Stricklin, an administrator with the Mine Safety and Health Administration, stated 25 were reported dead and four unaccounted for.

On Tuesday April 6, at 2 am, high levels of methane and carbon monoxide were detected forcing the team of rescuers to higher ground, further delaying the search. Crews had to drill into the mine in order to release the gases and test the air. An access road was created before three 1,000 foot shafts were drilled to release the methane and carbon monoxide. By that time, eleven of the dead miners had been identified. Fourteen bodies were still in the mine, in addition to the four missing people. Family members of the mine workers were angry after learning their relatives were dead from either government officials or a company website rather than from Massey Energy executives.

Although there were no indications that the four missing miners were still alive, the operations continued in rescue mode, rather than moving to recovery. Joe Manchin, the Governor of West Virginia, said, "Everyone is holding on to the hope that is their father, their son." Thursday morning, April 8, rescue workers prepared to re-enter the mine to continue the search for the four missing miners.

Rescue workers announced around midnight on Friday April 9 that the four remaining bodies had been found, bringing the death toll to 29. The miners had not been able to make it to either of the safety chambers. Poor conditions in the mine caused rescuers to walk past the bodies of the four miners on the first day of the rescue operation without seeing them. Saturday April 10, the mission was changed from rescue to recovery, and the 22 bodies remaining in the mine were removed over three hours. 28 of the dead were Massey employees and one was a contract worker.

== Investigation ==
Due to the large concentration of toxic gases in the mine, MSHA investigators had to wait for over two months to enter the mine for investigation. Investigators were able to enter the mine on July 2, 2010.

On May 19, 2011, the independent investigation team released a report which faulted both Massey Energy and the MSHA for the blast. Massey was strongly condemned by the report for multiple failures to meet basic safety standards outlined in the Mine Act of 1977. "A company that was a towering presence in the Appalachian coal fields operated its mines in a profoundly reckless manner, and 29 coal miners paid with their lives for the corporate risk taking," read the report. The investigation found that the company's ventilation system did not adequately ventilate the mine causing explosive gases to build up. Also detailed in the report are allegations that Massey Energy threatened miners with termination if they expressed safety concerns. Numerous other state and federal safety standards that Massey failed to comply with were detailed in the report.

Investigators also say that the U.S. Department of Labor and its Mine Safety and Health Administration were at fault for failing to act decisively at the mine even after Massey was issued 515 citations for safety violations at the Upper Big Branch mine in 2009. The report lambastes MSHA inspectors for failing to issue a flagrant violation citation which could have fined the company up to $220,000. Investigators claimed that this citation was entirely necessary given Massey's failure to meet basic safety protocols and the investigators found it "disturbing" that the violation was not issued. The failure to issue flagrant violation citations was attributed to MSHA which also failed to notify the miners and their families that they were working in a mine which had not met minimal safety requirements. As further evidence of MSHA's failures in the lead up to the UBB mine explosion, the report discusses how MSHA safety inspectors failed to enforce the safety protocols at Massey Energy's Aracoma Alma No. 1 mine. In 2007, a fire broke out at the Aracoma Alma No. 1 mine killing two miners. The report described the fire as "preventable" and cites an internal MSHA review following the fire which found that inspectors "were shocked by the deplorable conditions of the mine" and that MSHA inspectors had failed to enforce adequate safety measures. Furthermore, the report outlines how in the lead up to the blast the UBB mine "experienced at least three major methane-related events:" one in 1997, another in 2003, and a third in 2004. Instead of addressing these issues, "Upper Big Branch management elected to consider each methane outburst or explosion as an anomaly." Furthermore, MSHA officials "did not compel (or to our knowledge even ask) UBB management to implement" safety precautions following these events.

The report states that Massey used its power "to attempt to control West Virginia's political system." The report cites how politicians were afraid of the company because it "was willing to spend vast amounts of money to influence elections." Massey intentionally neglected safety precautions for the purpose of increasing profit margins according to the report. Safety precautions in mines are "a hard-earned right paid for with the blood of coal miners," read the report's introduction. These findings were repeated by miners and their families.

It was claimed that the FBI had launched a probe investigating the possible bribery of federal officials overseeing mining industry regulation by Massey Energy.

In November 2014 the then CEO, Don Blankenship, was indicted by a federal grand jury on four criminal counts, including conspiracy to violate safety laws, defrauding the federal government, securities fraud and making false statements to the United States Securities and Exchange Commission.

Blankenship was convicted of a single misdemeanor charge of conspiring to violate federal mine safety standards and went on to serve a one-year prison sentence. While serving that sentence, Blankenship wrote a 67-page blog post in which he called himself a "political prisoner". In May 2017, on the last day of Blankenship's prison sentence, he resumed his Twitter feud with Manchin, then a United States Senator, over the explosion. In July 2017, Blankenship said he was considering running against Manchin for the Senate. In September 2017, Blankenship produced a statewide television advertisement calling for another investigation into the explosion.

In August 2019, Omar J. Aboulhosn a federal magistrate judge looking into the case found that over 61 memorandums of interviews conducted by federal agents, along with other documents were never turned over by prosecutors during this case. Judge Aboulhosn wrote in a 60-page ruling that "those errors, when collectively reviewed, could have resulted in a different verdict", though he also wrote that there was no apparent sign of ulterior motives in the failure to turn over the documents. In the ruling summary, Aboulhosn wanted the one conviction thrown out, though it was a recommendation, and not a legal ruling, as the final decision lie with the United States District Court, which declined to throw out the conviction.

== Prior history of safety violations and fatalities ==
In 2009, the company, Massey Energy, was fined a total of $382,000 (~$556,350 in 2025) for "serious" unrepentant violations for lacking ventilation and proper equipment plans as well as failing to utilize its safety plan properly. In the previous month, the authorities cited the mine for 57 safety infractions. The mine received two safety citations the day before the explosion, 600 in the preceding 18 months, and 1,342 in the preceding five years. The CEO of Massey Energy, Don Blankenship, has received criticism for his apparent disregard of safety. Press coverage surrounding the event reported that the MSHA had cited the Upper Big Branch mine for over 1,300 safety violations since 2005 before the explosion, including 57 citations the month before and over $382,000 in fines over the previous year surrounding its ventilation plan and equipment. Federal records showed the company was fighting some of the highest fines or refusing to pay them.

The Upper Big Branch Mine-South, where the explosion occurred, has been in operation since October 1994. Between 2000 and 2009, two fatalities occurred at this mine. Between 1995 and 2010, the Mine Safety and Health Administration levied over $2.2 million in fines against Massey for more than 3,000 safety violations. In the previous year, 50 of the safety violations, more than 10%, were categorized as "unwarrantable failures to comply," which indicates willful or gross negligence; this was higher than the 2% national average.

One miner said mine officials "buy off judges and have political connections. They disregard safety rules; they get away with it. And most of all they work you to the bone." Another miner said "When you work for Massey, you give your life to Massey." According to the World Socialist Web Site, many of the mine's infractions prior to the explosion entailed a sharp increase in coal production, and that mine officials had political connections and would bribe judges in addition to disregarding safety rules and overworking employees.

== MSHA final report and Dept. of Justice settlement ==
On December 6, 2011, the MSHA concluded its investigation, deciding that the disaster was an entirely preventable coal dust explosion. It said "the root cause of the tragedy" was "unlawful policies and practices" of the company and issued 369 citations at the same time as the report.

On the same day the U.S. Attorney announced a settlement with Alpha Natural Resources, which had acquired Massey Energy's assets and liabilities in 2011.

Alpha Natural Resources will pay a MSHA $10.8 million civil fine plus $209 million for the Dept. of Justice settlement. The settlement comprises $46.5 million in restitution payments, $34.8 million in fines for safety citations, $48 million for a health and safety research and development trust fund, and $80 million for safety improvements during two years. The restitution payments are $1.5 million to each of the two survivors and the families of each of the 29 fatal casualties. The civil fine is about 5 times bigger than the previous largest fine for a mining accident. The settlement ends the corporation's criminal liability, although investigation of possible individual criminal liability continues.

The 1000 page MSHA report dismissed Massey Energy's theory of a sudden surge of natural gas. It said 12 of its citations were related to the disaster, including 9 in the most severe "flagrant" category. Most important was failure to check for methane and failure to clean up coal dust. It recounted examples of a corporate culture more devoted to production than safety, and recounted examples of employees sanctioned for delaying production in order to resolve safety issues.

While the investigation found the physical conditions that led to the coal dust explosion were the result of a series of basic safety violations at UBB, which PCC and Massey disregarded, the report cites unlawful policies and practices implemented by PCC and Massey as the root cause of the explosion --- including the intimidation of miners, advance notice of inspections, and two sets of books with hazards recorded in UBB's internal production and maintenance book but not in the official examination book. The investigation found that the operator promoted and enforced a workplace culture that valued production over safety, including practices calculated to allow it to conduct mining operations in violation of the law.

— MSHA News Release 11-1703-NAT

== Public reactions ==
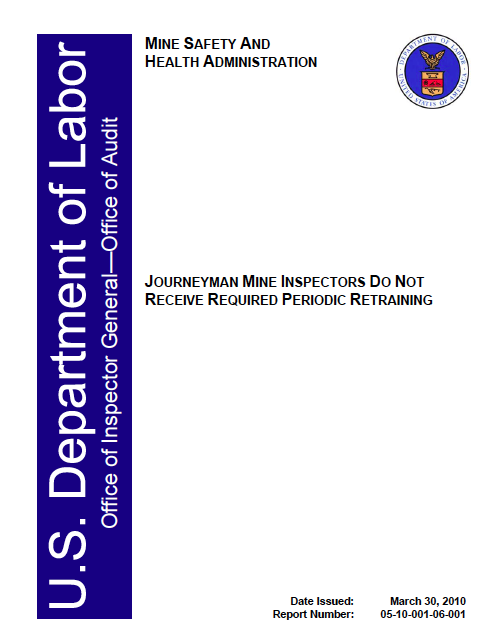
Cover of the MSHA Journeymen Report

State and federal leaders, including Governor Manchin, United States Senators Robert Byrd and Jay Rockefeller, United States Representative Shelley Moore Capito, and Cecil Roberts of the United Mine Workers of America, all expressed their condolences to the families of the workers. On April 5, 2010, Governor Manchin and President of the United States Barack Obama spoke over the phone; the president expressed his condolences and offered federal assistance. President Obama further requested a full report and said "it's clear that more needs to be done" about mine safety. The American Red Cross and the Salvation Army sent workers to the scene to provide emergency response vehicles, mental health counselors, food and water.

Davitt McAteer, former leader of the Mine Safety and Health Administration, had harsh words for the disaster citing lessons unlearned from the 2006 Sago Mine disaster: "That was defining of Sago. That was one of the first things that we are not doing enough and we know how to remove methane and control dust problems and the fact that we had an explosion with methane or dust suggests that we are not doing enough to protect miners." Days before the disaster a United States Department of Labor report emerged entitled "Journeyman Mine Inspectors Do Not Receive Required Periodic Training". The report detailed the federal government's shortcomings in retraining its mine inspectors.

Massey Energy is the sixth-largest coal company in the country, owning 56 mines. Historically, this area of West Virginia has been dependent on coal production and on Massey Energy. Relatives of the missing and confirmed dead expressed their anger that they were not notified directly by Massey Energy executives, but found out information from the company website or government sources. "They're supposed to be a big company", said Michelle McKinney, daughter of a missing employee, "These guys, they took a chance every day to work and make them big. And they couldn't even call us." McKinney was alerted of the incident by a local school. Miners stated that they were warned of reprimand or losing their jobs if they took time from work to attend funerals. A former miner asked, "Is a lump of coal that valuable to you that you can't even give the miners a day off to mourn their friends?" A miner's wife told the World Socialist Web Site, "These are the miners' brothers; they know them better than their own families, and they can't even attend their funerals."

Ted Turner commented on CNN about the mine disaster, stating "I'm just wondering if God is telling us He doesn't want to drill offshore (in the wake of the Deepwater Horizon oil spill off of the Gulf of Mexico.). And right before that, we had that coal mine disaster in West Virginia where we lost 29 miners ... Maybe the Lord's tired of having the mountains of West Virginia, the tops knocked off of them so they may get more coal. I think maybe we ought to just leave the coal in the ground and go with solar and wind power and geothermals..."

That September, the West Virginia University Mountaineers announced that they would wear Nike Pro Combat System of Dress uniforms, designed to pay respect to the deadly explosion at the Big Branch Mine, for the 2010 Backyard Brawl against the rival Pitt Panthers. According to the Pittsburgh Tribune Review, West Virginia will wear a shade of white "that looks as if it has a fine layer of dust on the jersey" and has accents in university gold that "references the canaries used long ago to test toxicity in mines." The helmet has a thin yellow line, designed to look like "the beam of light emitted by a miner's headlamp."

== Memorial and memorial service ==
Memorial monument

On April 25, 2010 President Obama and Vice President Joe Biden traveled to Beckley, West Virginia for a memorial service. President Obama gave a eulogy and mentioned each one of the miners who died at Upper Branch.

The Upper Big Branch Miners Memorial was built in Whitesville, West Virginia, and features a 48-foot (15 m) black granite monument with life-size silhouettes of 29 miners etched on the front.

The reverse side of the monument tells the "Story of Coal", a brief summary of the coal industry and its impact on West Virginia and the nation. Also etched on the back is a tribute to all coal miners who have suffered illness, injury or death as a result of working in the coal industry and a tribute to the makeshift gazebo memorial. The names of all 29 miners killed and the two survivors are listed as well. Dedicated in July 2012, the memorial also includes a bronze sculpture and plaque recognizing the local first responders and mine rescue teams from West Virginia and neighboring states that aided in recovery efforts. The bronze sculpture was created by West Virginia native Ross Straight.

Beside the parking area is a gateway to the memorial. Three interpretive signs tell the story of the Upper Big Branch Disaster and serve as an introduction to the events of that day and following week.

The memorial and plaza were designed by Rob Dinsmore of the Chapman Technical Group and built by Pray Construction.

In January 2013, a web memorial was launched.

== In popular culture ==
Steve Earle's song "It's About Blood" off of his 2020 album, Ghosts of West Virginia, memorializes the miners, naming each one. Most of the songs on the album were written for the off-Broadway play Coal Country about the Upper Big Branch mine explosion. Earle collaborated on the play written by Jessica Blank and Erik Jensen. The team drew on interviews with survivors and families of the miners.

Singer-songwriter Ray Harris's song "West Virginia Coal Mine" is about the Upper Big Branch Mine Disaster. The song is written from the point of view of a miner.

Hip-hop-bluegrass fusion group Gangstagrass recorded the song "Big Branch" with Portuguese-born artist Tomasia in their album Lightning on the Strings, Thunder on the Mic, released in 2010.

In 2010 the West Virginia band 600 Lbs of Sin came out with the song 29 - A Dirge in D Minor about the Mine Disaster (lead vocals by 2010 band member Sierra Ferrell). In 2021, the album He Walked On," by West Virginian Tim O'Brien, included a cover of "Five Miles In and One Mile Down," a tune by Dale Keys about the disaster.

== Guilty plea ==
"People who run coal mines have a fundamental obligation to be honest with mine regulators," said Booth Goodwin, U.S. Attorney for the Southern District of West Virginia, in announcing the guilty plea of a former superintendent of the Upper Big Branch Mine, Gary May, who confessed to conspiring to impede the Mine Safety and Health Administration's enforcement efforts.

He added, "When mine operators resort to tricks and deceit to keep government officials in the dark, our mine safety system unravels and miners are put in harm's way." May owned up to giving advance warning of inspections and concealing violations including "poor airflow in the mine; piles of loose, combustible coal; and scarcities of rock dust, which prevents mine explosions." When the plea was announced, May faced up to five years in prison and a $250,000 fine.

== See also ==
- Crandall Canyon Mine - 2007 mine collapse in Utah that killed six coal miners and three rescuers.
- Monongah mining disaster - 1907 explosion in West Virginia that killed at least 362 miners. Spurred the creation of the United States Bureau of Mines.
- Farmington Mine disaster - 1968 explosion in West Virginia that killed 78 miners and caused changes in mine safety legislation.
- Sago Mine disaster - 2006 explosion in West Virginia that killed 12 miners. Legislation at the Federal level plus West Virginia state legislation was enacted as a result.
