= Sago Mine disaster =

2006 coal mine explosion

Coordinates: 38°56′26″N 80°12′29″W

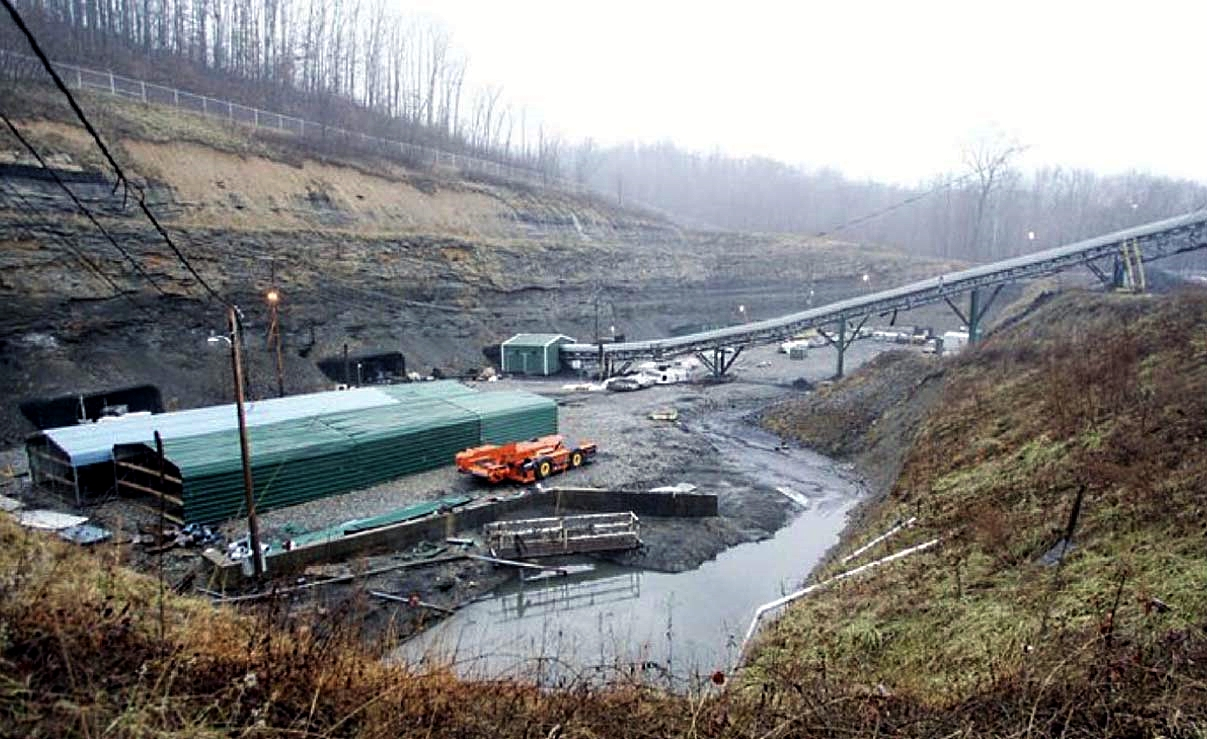
- Date: January 2, 2006
- Location: Sago, West Virginia, U.S.
- Cause: Undetermined; most likely from a lightning strike at the mine entrance
- Deaths: 12

The Sago Mine disaster was a coal mine explosion on January 2, 2006, at the Sago Mine in Sago, West Virginia, United States, near the Upshur County seat of Buckhannon. The blast and collapse trapped 13 miners for nearly two days; only one survived. It was the worst mining disaster in the United States since the Jim Walter Resources Mine disaster in Alabama on September 23, 2001, and the worst disaster in West Virginia since the 1968 Farmington Mine disaster. It was exceeded four years later by the Upper Big Branch Mine disaster, also a coal mine explosion in West Virginia, which killed 29 miners in April 2010.

The disaster received extensive news coverage worldwide. After mining officials released incorrect information, many media outlets initially reported, erroneously, that 12 of the miners survived.

== Background ==
=== Mine ownership ===
Anker West Virginia Mining was listed as the permittee for the Sago Mine. Testifying before U.S. Mine Safety and Health Administration (MSHA) on March 23, 2006, Vice President Sam Kitts described the corporate structure as follows, "Sago is part of Wolf Run Mining Company, which is a subsidiary of Hunter Ridge Mining Company. Hunter Ridge is a subsidiary of ICG, Inc." ICG (International Coal Group, Inc.) was formed in May 2004 by investor Wilbur Ross, who led a group that bought many of Horizon Natural Resources' assets in a bankruptcy auction. The company produces coal from 12 mining complexes in Northern and Central Appalachia (Kentucky, Maryland, and West Virginia) and from one complex in the Illinois Basin.

Ross, originally operating as Newcoal LLC with four other investors, expressed interest in buying Horizon's nonunion properties, but not its six union operations. According to the Associated Press (AP), Horizon was then allowed to sever its union contracts, including pension benefits, by bankruptcy court. In March 2005, ICG agreed to buy Anker Coal Group, Inc.

=== Prior inspection history ===
In 2005, the mine was cited by MSHA 208 times for violating regulations, up from 68 in 2004. Of those, 96 were considered S&S (significant/serious and substantial).

The Charleston Gazette said "Sago mine has a history of roof falls". MSHA found 52 violations from April to June, of which 31 were "serious and substantial" (S&S). From early July to late September, MSHA found 70 violations, 42 of which were S&S. MSHA inspections from early October to late December resulted in 46 citations and three orders, 18 of which were S&S. Violations include failure to follow the approved roof control and mine ventilation plans and problems concerning emergency escapeways and required pre-shift safety examinations. The Gazette article explained that "S&S" violations are those that MSHA believes are likely to cause an accident that would seriously injure a miner.

Originally, MSHA reported on its website that none of the violations were considered "immediate risk of injury" and that all but three violations, related to shoring up the roof, were corrected by the time of the accident. But the current posting says, "Of the 208 citations, orders and safeguards issued in 2005, several involved significant violations that were the result of high negligence and MSHA ordered that mining cease in the affected area until the unsafe condition was addressed."

"Mining operations at the Sago Mine more than doubled between 2004 and 2005, and the injury rate was significantly above the national average. This prompted MSHA to dramatically increase—by 84%—its on-site inspection and enforcement presence. As a result, MSHA also took significantly more enforcement actions—208 in total—against Sago Mine in 2005, requiring the operator to quickly correct health and safety violations in accordance with federal Mine Act standards." Davitt McAteer, Assistant Secretary for Mine Safety during the Clinton administration, told the Gazette, "The numbers don't sound good....[they are] sufficiently high that it should tip off management that there is something amiss here. For a small operation, that is a significant number of violations." McAteer said the roof fall frequency "suggests that the roof is bad and that the support system is not meeting the needs of the roof."

On January 3, 2006, Bruce Watzman of the National Mining Association, interviewed by Tom Foreman for Anderson Cooper 360, was asked whether any of the violations "leaps out at you as endangering miners' lives?" Watzman explained that they could be "paperwork errors [or] reporting errors. A lot of violations, but many of which were not significant to really impact miner safety." By contrast, a report in Christian Science Monitor on January 6, 2006, quotes McAteer as saying "Sago raises red flags for mine oversight ... If you have a widespread practice of S&S violations over an extended period of time like we have here, it suggests that you've got much more serious problems than just paperwork violations". Relying on MSHA records, Ellen Smith, the editor of Mine Safety and Health News, comments on her publication's website in an article, Sago Mine Facts that "Sago's accident rate was 17.04 for 2005, with 16 miners and contractors injured on the job. Sago's accident rate was 15.90 in 2004 when the national average was 5.66. Compare this accident rate to another small mine in West Virginia, Kingston Mining No. 1 Mine, which had an accident rate of 1.21 in 2005."

== Explosion ==
The explosion occurred at approximately 6:30 a.m. ET at the beginning of the first shift after the mine reopened after the New Year's holiday weekend. An examination conducted at 5:50 am by a mine fire boss had cleared the mine for use. Two carts of miners were making their way into the mine to begin work.

=== Early theories of cause ===
Early reports noted that there was a thunderstorm in the area at the time and suggested a lightning strike near the mine entrance may have ignited methane, but no one reported seeing such a strike. Sensors from the U.S. National Lightning Detection Network indicated there were at least two cloud-to-ground lightning strikes near the mine. Another early theory was that lightning struck a methane well that had previously been drilled from the surface to an area behind the seals. Methane wells are used to extract methane from coal seams and sometimes form sealed areas when methane levels are high.

Storm systems are accompanied by low atmospheric pressure, which causes more methane to escape from coal seams and sealed areas. In winter the air is drier and less dense and creates a drier mine environment. Such conditions have been known to contribute to past mine fires and explosions. Other factors affecting methane liberation include whether the mine ventilation system is exhausting (negative pressure) or blowing (positive pressure), and the operating pressures of the fans.

Fourteen men on the second cart escaped the initial explosion. The 12 trapped miners were on the first cart, which apparently passed the point where the explosion occurred. The foreman on the second cart, whose brother was among those trapped, the mine superintendent and three others entered the mine to rescue the trapped miners. They reached 9,000 feet (2,700 m) into the mine before air quality detectors indicated there was too much carbon monoxide (CO) to proceed. In addition, repairs they had made to ventilation controls raised fears that increased fresh air to the interior of the mine may cause a second explosion.

=== Victims ===
Of the thirteen miners, Randal L. McCloy Jr., 26, was the only survivor from those trapped at the Sago mine. He was removed from the site at approximately 1:30 a.m. on January 4, and transported to St. Joseph's Hospital in Buckhannon, West Virginia. After being stabilized there, McCloy was transported by ambulance later that morning to a level 1 trauma center at West Virginia University's Ruby Memorial Hospital, 50 miles (80 km) away in Morgantown. He was found to be suffering from carbon monoxide poisoning, a collapsed lung, brain hemorrhaging, edema, muscle injury, faulty liver and heart function.

On the evening of January 5, McCloy was transferred to Allegheny General Hospital in Pittsburgh to receive infusions of oxygen in a hyperbaric chamber to counteract the effects of carbon monoxide. On January 7, he returned to Ruby Memorial Hospital where he remained in a coma. On January 18, doctors reported McCloy was showing signs of gradual awakening. On January 25, doctors reported McCloy was emerging from the coma, but was still unable to talk.

On January 26, 2006, West Virginia Hospitals announced that McCloy had been transferred from Ruby Memorial to its HealthSouth Mountainview Regional Rehabilitation Hospital in Morgantown, and was under the care of a rehabilitation specialist. He was responsive, could eat, but was still unable to talk. McCloy recovered almost fully after months of physical therapy, but he stated he still suffered from some vision and hearing impairment as well as weakness on the right side of his body.

Private funerals for the 12 deceased miners were held on January 8 to 10, 2006. A public memorial service was held on January 15 for them at West Virginia Wesleyan College in Buckhannon. More than 2,000 attended the service, which was televised live on CNN. Among the speakers were West Virginia Governor Joe Manchin, and author and West Virginia native Homer Hickam. Both of West Virginia's U.S. senators, Robert Byrd and Jay Rockefeller, and U.S. Representative Shelley Capito also attended, but did not speak.

== Rescue ==
It was reported that the early hours after the blast were chaotic and the mining company did not call a specialized mine rescue crew until 8:04 a.m.—more than 90 minutes after the blast. The company notified MSHA at 8:30. The company said it started its calls at 7:40. MSHA records two calls at 8:10 to personnel who were out of town due to the holiday. MSHA personnel arrived on site at approximately 10:30 a.m. The first rescue crew arrived ten minutes later.

High levels of carbon monoxide (CO) and methane gas in the mine atmosphere made it necessary for rescuers to wait 12 hours after the explosion to begin to reach the miners. Tests taken through holes drilled from the surface showed that the air near where the miners were last known to be stationed contained 1,300 parts per million of CO. More than 200 parts per million is considered unsafe. However, each miner had a self-contained self-rescuer (SCSR) device that provided one hour of breathable air. Emergency supplies were stored in 55-U.S.-gallon (210 L) drums within the mine.

Even after the gases abated, rescue teams had to proceed with caution, continually testing for hazards such as water seeps, explosive gas concentrations, and unsafe roof conditions. This limited their rate of progress to 1,000 feet (300 m) an hour. They checked in every 500 feet (150 m), and then disconnected their telephones until the next checkpoint in order to avoid the possibility of a spark creating another explosion. MSHA had deployed a 1,300-pound (590 kg) robot into the mine as well, but pulled it out after it became mired 2,600 feet (790 m) from the mine entrance.

After more than nine hours of searching, rescue teams pulled out of the mine at about 3:40 a.m. Tuesday, January 3. Through an agency spokeswoman, Bob Friend of MSHA said the teams were withdrawn when they discovered that the mine's atmospheric monitoring system was still running. Due to the air quality in the mine, power to the system could have caused another explosion, according to safety experts. A borehole being drilled to check the mine's air quality was nearing the mine roof. "The bit and steel being used was not equipped to use water, which meant the bit was hot and could ignite an explosive mixture of methane," Friend told a reporter from the West Virginia Gazette. Rescue teams returned to the mine 6:22 a.m.

=== Locating the trapped miners ===
The 13 trapped miners were about 2 miles (3.2 km) inside the mine at approximately 280 feet (85 m) below ground. Five four-man teams tried to make their way through the entries, which were 5.5 feet (170 cm) high. By 12:40 p.m. on January 3, they had reached 10,200 feet (3,100 m) into the mine. It was believed that the trapped miners were somewhere between 11,000 to 13,000 metres (36,000 to 43,000 ft) from the entrance.

Two 6.25-inch (15.9 cm) holes were drilled from the surface into areas where the miners were believed to be; microphones and video cameras lowered into them for ten-minute periods did not find any signs of life. Air quality tests performed through the first hole on the morning of January 3 indicated that CO levels in that part of the mine were at 1,300 parts per million. Officials called this "very discouraging". A third hole encountered groundwater and could not be drilled all the way down. However, the miners were trained to find a safe part of the mine and barricade themselves into it in the event of an explosion or collapse. Experts expected that a third hole, if successful, could expand the opening and provide a better way of rescuing the miners than proceeding into the mine. Miners are required to carry an SCSR that provides a one-hour supply of oxygen for evacuation. The first hint of the miners' status came around 5:00 p.m. on January 3 when it was reported that a body had been found. Because of the location of the body, those familiar with the miners and their jobs believed it was the fire boss, Terry Helms. Hours later, just before midnight, rumors spread quickly that 12 of the 13 miners had been found alive. Thirty minutes later, the rescue team told company officials that the original report was incorrect.

In the early morning of January 4, 41 hours after the incident began, 12 of the miners were found dead. Randal L. McCloy Jr. was found alive, but in critical condition. The remaining miners were found at the working face of the second left portion of the mine, some 2.5 miles (4 km) from the mine entrance, behind a "rough barricade structure", as described by Hatfield. This is the same area where drilling had indicated high carbon monoxide levels.

About three hours after the reports, company CEO Bennett Hatfield confirmed that McCloy was the sole survivor. This was the first official report from the company since the victims were found.

Soon after the first reports of survivors, ambulances and the hospital emergency room were on standby. Hatfield said that CO levels in the area where the miners were found was in the range of 300–400 ppm when the rescue team arrived. This is near the safe threshold level to support life for 15 minutes. He said that CO poisoning was the likely cause of death. "Our intentions are to do the right thing and protect our people the best we can ... Federal and state mining officials will conduct a thorough investigation of the accident with full company support", Hatfield said.

=== Sole survivor's account of explosion ===
McCloy wrote a letter to the families of the victims, which was published in the Charleston Gazette on April 28, 2006. McCloy wrote that three weeks before the explosion, he and Junior Toler found, while drilling a bolt hole, a gas pocket, which detectors confirmed the presence of methane. "We immediately shut down the roof bolter, and the incident was reported up the line to our superiors. I noticed the following day that the gas leak had been plugged with glue normally used to secure the bolts."

He remembered that on January 2, 2006, just after exiting the mantrip, "the mine filled quickly with fumes and thick smoke and that breathing conditions were nearly unbearable...." At least four of the emergency oxygen packs were not functioning. "I shared my rescuer with Jerry Groves, while Toler, Jesse Jones and Tom Anderson sought help from others. There were not enough rescuers to go around." Because of the bad air, they "had to abandon our escape attempt and return to the coal rib, where we hung a curtain to try to protect ourselves. The curtain created an enclosed area of about 35 feet."

They "attempted to signal our location to the surface by beating on the mine bolts and plates. We found a sledgehammer, and for a long time we took turns pounding away. We had to take off the rescuers in order to hammer as hard as we could. This effort caused us to breathe much harder. We never heard a responsive blast or shot from the surface."

After becoming exhausted, they stopped trying to signal. "The air behind the curtain grew worse, so I tried to lie as low as possible and take shallow breaths ... I could tell that it was gassy." According to McCloy, Toler and Anderson tried to find a way out. "The heavy smoke and fumes caused them to quickly return. There was just so much gas." At that point the miners, despite their fears, "began to accept our fate. Toler led us all in the Sinner's Prayer. We prayed a little longer, then someone suggested that we each write letters to our loved ones".

McCloy "became very dizzy and lightheaded. Some drifted off into what appeared to be a deep sleep, and one person sitting near me collapsed and fell off his bucket, not moving. It was clear that there was nothing I could do to help him. The last person I remember speaking to was Jackie Weaver, who reassured me that if it were our time to go, then God's will would be fulfilled. As my trapped co-workers lost consciousness one by one, the room grew still and I continued to sit and wait, unable to do much else. I have no idea how much time went by before I also passed out from the gas and smoke, awaiting rescue."

On January 5, notes written by some of the deceased miners were submitted to family members.

=== Early response of government officials ===
West Virginia Governor Joe Manchin arrived at the Sago site on January 2. Congresswoman Shelley Moore Capito was also among the officials that joined the family members at the scene. The MSHA had approximately 25 people on the scene at any given time, according to the Agency's Web site.

=== Mine closure ===
On March 11, 2006, AP reported that federal inspectors had approved the Sago mine for reopening the previous day.

On March 16, the Village Voice reported that the mine reopened. The paper criticized, "So, not knowing what caused the explosion, or whether the mine remains vulnerable to that kind of accident, the mine owners started operations again as the federal and state safety officials stood by." ICG closed the mine on March 19, 2007. On December 12, 2008, they announced on their website they would be closing it permanently.

== Investigations ==
=== West Virginia government ===
Governor Joe Manchin announced on January 9 that he had appointed J. Davitt McAtteer, Assistant Secretary for Mine Safety and Health during the Clinton administration, to oversee a state probe of the disaster. The Charleston Gazette named the committee to the Sago probe as including former miner Mike Caputo, D-Marion; Eustace Frederick, D-Mercer; and Bill Hamilton, R-Upshur; and Sens. Jeff Kessler, D-Marshall; Shirley Love, D-Fayette; and Don Caruth, R-Mercer.

On March 1, 2006, Governor Manchin announced the March 14, 2006, hearing had been rescheduled for May 2, delayed at the request of several family members of miners who died in the disaster. McAteer said the complex investigation warranted a careful and thorough investigation only with all the facts. McAteer later moderated a joint federal-state hearing to be held on the campus of West Virginia Wesleyan College in Buckhannon, to include a panel of MSHA, the West Virginia Office of Miners' Health, Safety & Training (WVMHST), state, labor and industry officials. Manchin said, "I'm confident that May's public hearings will be very useful in providing crucial information to the families of these fallen miners." McAteer said MSHA and the state Office of Miners Health, Safety and Training have agreed to publish transcripts of the so far secret interviews in the federal investigation before the May 2 hearing. The commission released its preliminary report on the Sago disaster on July 19, 2006.

=== U.S. Department of Labor ===
On January 4, 2006, U.S. Secretary of Labor Elaine L. Chao, announced that MSHA would launch a full investigation to determine the cause, and to "take the necessary steps to ensure that this never happens again." MSHA issued its own release, announcing an independent eight-member team that would conduct the investigation including the cause of the explosion, compliance with regulations and the handling of information on the trapped miners' condition. The team would examine the site, interview mine personnel and others with information, review records and plans, inspect any equipment involved and issue any citations for violations. The MHSA website reiterated that its team "will be headed up by a senior MSHA safety professional who has not been part of the initial inspection and enforcement efforts."

On January 9, 2006, David G. Dye, Acting Assistant Secretary of Labor for Mine Safety and Health, announced that "MSHA joins Governor Manchin and the State of West Virginia in announcing that we will conduct a joint investigation into the Sago Mine disaster, which will include a joint public hearing. West Virginia has its own mine safety inspection and enforcement agency, and we want to coordinate closely to ensure that our investigation is thorough and complete ... Our full investigative report will also be made available to the families and the public".

It was announced that Richard A. Gates, MSHA district manager in Birmingham, Alabama, would head the team of technical experts. Others would be ventilation experts John Urosek and Richard Stoltz, ventilation supervisor Dennis Swentosky; electrical supervisor Robert Bates, field office supervisor Joseph O'Donnell, engineer Clete Stephan, and special investigator Gary Harris.

==== UMWA participation ====
On January 18, 2006, mine owner ICG issued a press release objecting to United Mine Workers of America (UMWA) participation in the investigation, accusing the union of attempting to manipulate a provision of the federal regulations, and seeking to interfere with the investigation in order to exploit the tragedy for its own purposes.

In reply, UMWA International President Cecil Roberts denied 'manipulation', saying that it was fulfilling its responsibility under the MSHA regulations. He accused the ICG of attempting to get the identities of the miners who designated the UMWA as their representative, and questioned why they needed to know that, and what they would do with that information.

MSHA filed a motion in federal court to allow UMWA participation, and U.S. District Judge Robert E. Maxwell ordered ICG to allow UMWA officials to enter the mine, saying "There's no question that the public interest is best served by a complete and thorough investigation into the occurrence of the problems at the Sago Mine .... There is a strong public interest in allowing miners to play a role in this investigation, as it is their health and safety that is at issue". On January 27, 2006, the ICG said it would appeal.

==== MSHA Freedom of Information Act disclosure policy ====
The Sago Mine Disaster brought public attention to criticism of the Freedom of Information Act (FOIA) policy first raised by Ellen Smith, editor of Mine Safety and Health News in a July 16, 2004, editorial, "Assault on Freedom of Information".

She reported complaints from UMWA for over a year, from mine operators and by her paper that they could no longer get information from MSHA though the FOIA. She stated that the previous week, "Ed Clair, the U.S. Labor Department's Associate Solicitor for Mine Safety and Health, disclosed that, without public comment or input, MSHA secretly changed its long-standing policy of routinely releasing inspector notes under the Freedom of Information Act." The prior policy had been in effect since the Mine Act of 1977.

She continued, "Now, the public will no longer be able to get MSHA inspector notes from a mine inspection, unless the operator or miner is willing to go through legal proceedings and the discovery process. Under this new policy, the press is certainly excluded from these notes, miners may be as well, and it certainly hampers an operator's ability to resolve many MSHA enforcement disputes without litigation."

On January 11, 2006, Representative Henry A. Waxman (D-CA) asked Labor Secretary Chao to reverse MSHA's 2004 decision to exclude mine safety inspectors' notes in FOIA responses, citing how the agency's secrecy policy limited disclosure about safety violations at the Sago mine for years before the recent disaster.

On January 20, 2006, Education and the Workforce Committee Chairman John Boehner (R-OH), Workforce Protections Subcommittee Chairman Charlie Norwood (R-GA) and Shelley Moore Capito (R-WV), sent a letter to Chao, also requesting a reversal.

According to a news release by Boehner, on January 30, 2006, Acting Assistant Secretary David G. Dye wrote, "I have recently concluded that, given MSHA's unique statutory framework, inspector notes should generally be released once a citation has been issued (or an inspection is closed without citations), rather than withholding the notes until all litigation is concluded. The policy will be effective immediately".

==== Transcripts of interviews ====
Transcripts of 70 closed-door interviews of Sago miners, mine managers, mine rescue team members and state and federal mine safety inspectors, conducted over the period from January 17, 2006, to April 5, 2006, are available at both the Charleston Gazette and the West Virginia Office of Miners' Health, Safety and Training websites. As of April 28, MSHA had not posted the interviews on its site.

Transcripts were made public only after The Charleston Gazette filed a FOIA request for the documents and posted the documents to its website on April 16, 2006. "At first, state officials released a limited number of the transcripts, but then made others widely available after the Gazette obtained them and posted them on the Internet", reported Gazette reporter Ken Ward Jr. in his April 22, 2006, story, "Details of ICG's inquiry into Sago disaster sought."

During his interview with government investigators on March 23, 2006, ICG Vice President Sam Kitts repeatedly refused to discuss the company's investigation. His Lexington, Kentucky, attorney, Maraco M. Rajkovich, who also represented several other ICG employees during the interviews, said ICG had not authorized Kitts to answer questions about the investigation. Rajkovich said he did not know who was authorized to answer such questions.

==== MSHA publishes details of public hearing ====
In an April 13, 2006, Federal Register notice, MSHA said state and federal officials would question witnesses at the Sago public hearing. A representative of the Sago victims' families will be able to submit questions for witnesses.

==== ICG refuses to release records ====
In that same April 22, 2006, Charleston Gazette story, "Details of ICG's inquiry into Sago disaster sought", Ken Ward Jr. reported that investigators from MSHA and the West Virginia Office of Miners Health, Safety and Training were negotiating with ICG to release company's internal investigation, as well as testimony, for a Manchin administration public hearing on the Sago disaster scheduled to start May 2, 2006, at West Virginia Wesleyan College in Buckhannon. "We certainly want to see what they have," said Bob Friend, Acting Deputy Assistant Secretary for Mine Safety and Health.

==== Office of the Solicitor, Division of Mine Safety and Health ====
Attorneys James Crawford, Tim Williams and Bob Wilson will assist in the investigation according to MSHA's January 4, 2006, release available on the website.

=== U.S. Senate ===
==== First investigation ====
On January 9, 2006, on his congressional website, the Senate Appropriations Committee: Labor, Heath Human Services and Education Subcommittee's ranking Democrat, West Virginia Senator Robert Byrd, announced a January 19, 2006, hearing, crediting Senator Arlen Specter (R-PA), and Iowa Senator Tom Harkin, ranking Democrat on the subcommittee, for their help in its scheduling.

"The families of the Sago miners deserve to know what happened in that mine," Byrd said. "Just as importantly, miners and their families across this country want to know that steps are being taken to prevent others from ever experiencing such pain."

He added, "The investigation at the Upshur County mine will tell us what caused that deadly explosion. But one conclusion is already evident: it's time for the decisions affecting America's miners to be made with their best interests at heart. That should be the legacy of the Sago miners":

In Congress, there are tough questions to be asked of the federal Mine Safety and Health Administration (MSHA). Is enforcement of coal mining regulations tough enough? Are the regulations on the books today current enough to handle the challenges posed by 21st century coal mining? Are mine hazards being minimized? These and other issues demand scrutiny, and the miners' families deserve the answers.

On January 13, on its website, the committee issued a notice of the subcommittee meeting. Federal witnesses would be Acting Assistant Secretary of Labor for Mine Safety and Health David Dye, Deputy Assistant Secretary for Mine Safety and Health Bob Friend, Coal Mine Safety and Health Administrator Ray McKinney and Mine Safety and Health Associate Solicitor, Edward Claire. Industry witnesses will be ICG President and CEO Ben Hatfield, West Virginia Coal Association Senior Vice President Chris Hamilton and National Mining Association Vice President for Safety and Health Bruce Watzman. West Virginia witness will be investigation leader Davitt McAteer. Labor witness will be UMWA International President Cecil Roberts.

On January 18, 2006, on its website, the committee rescheduled the hearing for January 23, 2006. The witness list remained the same.

The Republican members of the subcommittee were Arlen Specter (Chairman; PA), Thad Cochran (MS), Judd Gregg (NH), Larry Craig (ID), Kay Bailey Hutchison (TX), Ted Stevens (AK), Mike DeWine (OH) and Richard Shelby (AL). The Democratic members were Tom Harkin (Ranking Member; IA), Daniel Inouye (HI), Harry Reid (NV), Senator Herb Kohl (WI), Patty Murray (WA), Mary Landrieu (LA), Richard Durbin (IL).

The written versions of testimony from the hearings were posted on the Appropriations Committee website.

==== Second investigation ====
In a January 10, 2006, letter found on his website, Senator Jay Rockefeller (D-WV) wrote Senate Health, Education, Labor, and Pensions (HELP) Committee chairman Mike Enzi (R-WY) and ranking Democrat, Edward M. Kennedy (MA). Also signing the letter were coal state senators Robert Byrd (D-WV), Rick Santorum (R-PA), Paul Sarbanes (D-MD), Richard Durbin (D-IL), Richard Shelby (R-AL), Evan Bayh (D-IN), Barack Obama (D-IL), Jim Bunning (R-KY), Ken Salazar (D-CO), Mitch McConnell (R-KY), and Richard Lugar (R-IN). In a press release about the letter, Rockefeller stated,

We need to know why the administration thinks that it can carry out a policy where it is committing fewer and fewer resources to meet an industry that has more and more needs ... We need congressional hearings not only so that we can determine what happened at Sago, but, more broadly, about the state of mine safety across West Virginia and across the country."

Enzi held a confirmation hearing January 31, 2006, for George W. Bush's nominee to head MSHA, Richard Stickler. He announced he had written a January 5, 2006, letter to Labor Secretary Elaine L. Chao requesting "regular and comprehensive briefings on the progress and preliminary findings" of the MSHA investigation and enforcement efforts at the Sago mine.

Enzi held an oversight hearing March 2, 2006, into safety procedures and enforcement measures related to the disaster.

=== U.S. House of Representatives ===
On January 4, 2006, Representatives George Miller (D-CA) and Major Owens (D-NY) wrote a letter posted on Miller's website to House Education and Workforce Committee: Workforce Protections Subcommittee Chairman John Boehner (R-OH) asking for a hearing, saying Congress had abdicated its oversight responsibilities on worker safety issues, while the Bush administration filled worker safety agencies with industry insiders.

On January 5, 2006, Representative Shelley Moore Capito (R-WV) wrote Chairman Boehner requesting him to schedule a hearing at the earliest possible date and posted the letter on her congressional website.

The chairman, along with subcommittee member Charlie Norwood (R-GA), issued a statement posted on the committee's website, "We expect MSHA to produce a thorough account of the events that occurred before, during, and after this tragedy, and the Committee will closely monitor this investigation to ensure its timely completion. Following a full accounting of the facts, the Committee will examine the results of the investigation and determine what appropriate steps may be necessary to ensure a similar tragedy never happens again."

== Findings to date on possible causes ==
=== Lightning strike and seismic activity ===
Weatherbug, a Germantown, Maryland-headquartered weather tracking system reported on January 6, 2006, that, "the evidence suggests that the lightning strike could have caused the explosion due to the correlation between the timing and location of the lightning strike and seismic activity." The company's equipment detected 100 lightning strikes in the region within 40 minutes of the explosion. A single, powerful lightning strike registered at or near the mouth of the Sago mine at 6:26:36 a.m. This strike carried a particularly high positive current of 35 kA. (A typical strike is 22 to 25 kA and relatively rare positive strikes tend to be especially destructive.) Dr. Martin Chapman, PhD, a Virginia Tech research assistant professor, found that two independent sensors recorded a minor seismic event, possibly from the explosion, 2 seconds later at 6:26:38 a.m.

=== Use of foam rather than concrete seals ===
In his January 13, 2006, story in the Charleston Gazette, "Sago blast area was recently sealed", Ken Ward Jr. reported that state officials approved the use of "Omega blocks", a dense foam product, to seal the mine, rather than the required concrete blocks. Deputy director of the West Virginia Office of Miners' Health, Safety and Training told the state board of that group that, "the seals, made with foam, could withhold pressures of five pounds per square inch."

U.S. Mine Safety and Health Administration rules seals to be built using "solid concrete blocks" or alternate materials that will withstand 20 pounds per square inch of pressure.

The National Institute for Occupational Safety and Health (NIOSH) in its report, "Protecting Coal Miners from Gob Explosions through Explosion-Resistant Mine Ventilation Seals (1993–2005)" reported that "without reliable seal designs, miners' lives could be in jeopardy from the consequences of an underground explosion." NIOSH also noted that in an explosion caused by lightning in a sealed area of the Gary 50 Mine, 4 feet (1.2 m) thick pumped cement seals tested by NIOSH and approved by MSHA, "effectively contained the explosion, thereby sparing the miners working nearby."

=== Proximity with active gas and oil wells ===
In the January 13, 2006, Charleston Gazette story "Gas wells near mine", staff writers Paul J. Nyden and Ken Ward Jr. report that according to just released state mine permit records, at least four natural gas wells were in close proximity to the mine. One appeared to be adjacent to the sealed area where the explosion is believed to have occurred.

=== Sparks from restarting machinery after holiday ===
On January 3, 2006, Jeselyn King and Betheny Holstein, writing for the Wheeling Intelligencer, had written a story "Explosion's Cause Remains Unknown". Former MSHA official Davitt McAteer said restarting operations after a holiday weekend may have caused sparks to ignite an excess buildup of methane gas and coal dust in the mine.

== Media coverage ==
News of the Sago mine explosion first broke widely to television viewers on the cable news channel CNN. At approximately 11:41 a.m. on January 2, during CNN Live Today, anchor Daryn Kagan, announced, "This just in, news out of West Virginia, an underground explosion at a coal mine there."

Hundreds of media, reporters, camera crews, satellite trucks and photographers descended on the small community, taking over yards and setting up camp outside the Sago Baptist Church and at the mine's coal processing plant. Officials had turned a small second-story room there into a makeshift briefing room for the media.

CNN with Anderson Cooper, Fox News with Geraldo Rivera and MSNBC with Rita Cosby all broadcast live from Sago throughout the night of January 3 and early morning of January 4 as the story continually changed.

Shortly before rumors started spreading that the miners were found alive Tuesday night (and then reversed Wednesday morning), a reporter there posted a description of the scene on his blog, My West Virginia (now defunct)

Sago Road, where the mine is, follows the Buckhannon River and a set of railroad tracks. When you arrive just outside the Sago Baptist church, where relatives and friends of the miners have gathered, you see cars. Everywhere, lining the roads, in people's yards, there are cars as far as you can see. Then, you see satellite trucks and TV crews and reporters and photographers. They're also everywhere and you can tell our presence, just under 24 hours at the time, is taking a toll on the small town and the little area we've taken over.

=== Miscommunication and wrong reports ===
About 11:50 p.m. on January 3, news services including AP and Reuters reported that 12 of the 13 miners had survived, attributing the reports of survivors to the family members. CNN.com and other websites sported headlines including "We Got 12 Alive!" as well as "Believe in Miracles: 12 Miners Found Alive."

Governor Manchin, who was in the church with the families when the first incorrect reports began to come in, was soon seen outside the church celebrating "a miracle". The governor later said that his staff never confirmed that there were survivors, but was euphoric along with the families at what seemed to be remarkable news. Congresswoman Capito appeared on CNN about 1:00 a.m. and said 12 miners had been brought out alive.

At about 2:45 a.m., Lynette Roby, a resident of Sago, and her two young children told CNN's Anderson Cooper that Hatfield had just told family members in the church that a miscommunication had taken place and only one of the 13 miners had been found alive. The family members reportedly began to shout and call mine officials "liars" and at least one person in the church had "lunged" at mine officials.

Weeks later, CNN's Randi Kaye told an audience at West Virginia University that she had been listening to Cooper's interview from outside the Sago Baptist Church.

"I heard this unfolding on our air and I must have said something out loud because there was a print photographer standing beside me and he said, 'Did you just say what I think you said?' and I said, 'I think there's only one alive,'" the CNHI News Service quoted Kaye as saying. "Then one of our producers was screaming in my ear, 'Get confirmation. Get confirmation'", Kaye said.

Bennett Hatfield confirmed the miscommunication at a press conference shortly thereafter. Initial information indicated that the miscommunication occurred between the rescue team in the mine and the command center at the surface. According to Hatfield, several personnel at the center were able to simultaneously hear the communications directly from the rescue team. Because of the state regulatory officials on site, both company and state officials, including representatives from the governor's office, were present at the command center. Hatfield estimated that 15–20 minutes elapsed before they learned that there was in fact a miscommunication.

==== "Bad information" ====
The CEO said he did not know how the reports of 12 survivors spread, and noted that ICG never officially made that statement, calling it "bad information" that "spread like wildfire". He said that the information could have been spread through "stray cell-phone communication". "I have no idea who made that announcement," he said, "but it was not an announcement that International Coal Group had authorized."

Asked by reporters why the company allowed rumors to circulate for several hours, Hatfield said officials had been trying to clarify and verify information before putting family members on an even worse emotional roller coaster. However, Fox correspondent Bill Hemmer said he was "ashamed" of how the media repeatedly reported the existence of survivors even as reporters and producers themselves were growing to understand that, in his words, "something didn't add up".

Hemmer noted that the coal company, which had been quite punctual in its dealings with the media throughout the rescue attempt, had not given any information to corroborate the allegations that 12 miners had been rescued, and that the always-available Manchin was nowhere to be found, yet the cable news channels continued to report the story anyway until doctors in a hospital many miles away stated that they had had no contact with emergency service personnel about any of the miners except for McCloy.

Speaking on MSNBC's Imus in the Morning program, Lisa Daniels speculated that erroneous reports about survivors on local radio stations were heard by mine officials, causing them to question the accuracy of their own information stating that 12 of the 13 were dead, which in turn delayed an official announcement. Twelve died and one survived.

==== Wrong headlines ====
Many Wednesday morning newspapers in the United States erroneously reported on their front pages that 12 miners were found alive. USA Today ran a headline in their East Coast edition that read "Alive! Miners beat odds". The print edition of The New York Times attributed its information to the family members, but the Times's website initially displayed a headline that expressed the live rescue as fact. Others, such as the Washington Post, were unclear in their attributions.

In a published report on the website of the newspaper trade journal Editor & Publisher, the editor of The Inter-Mountain, a local afternoon daily based in Elkins, West Virginia, blamed the national media's inaccurate reporting on a lack of knowledge of local culture. "We get a lot of people here who sometimes believe they have an inside story because they hear it on a police scanner or listen to a conversation," Linda Skidmore said. "We know to be cautious of those situations."

=== Media criticism of MSHA ===
Critics suggested that the severity of the accident's aftermath was related in part to inadequate safety standards endorsed by the MSHA under David Lauriski, a mining industry executive appointed to head the agency by George W. Bush. On January 6, 2006, Scott Lilly, a columnist for the Center for American Progress wrote about Lauriski in his article, "MSHA and the Sago Mine Disaster: How Many Brownies are there in this Administration?" An August 9, 2004, story in The New York Times by Christopher Drew and Richard A. Oppel, Jr., "Friends in the White House Come to Coal's Aid", had summed up Lauriski's record. Other problems cited included the rejection of a proposed clarification of an existing standard, "Escapeways and Refuges", by Lauriski's administration, which requires that a mine "shall have two or more separate, properly maintained escapeways to the surface...."

A January 5 editorial in The New York Times explicitly linked the safety conditions at the mine to the effects of "an industry with pervasive political clout and patronage inroads in government regulatory agencies". It noted that "political figures from both parties have long defended and profited from ties to the coal industry", and asserted that "the Bush administration's cramming of important posts in the Department of the Interior with biased operatives" created doubts about mine safety, singling out J. Steven Griles, a former mining lobbyist and onetime deputy secretary of the Interior who, The Times alleged "devoted four years to rolling back mine regulations." Federal responsibility for enforcing the Federal Mine Safety and Health Act of 1977, which governs the activities of the MSHA, was transferred from the Department of the Interior to the Department of Labor in 1978.

A second editorial in the Times, on January 6 discussed budget cuts to the MSHA and "the Bush administration's ... [appointment] of a raft of political appointees directly from energy corporations to critical regulatory posts" in the context of the disaster, suggesting that the Sago 12 "might have survived if government had lived up to its responsibilities."

Other commentators, including Scott Shields, a blogger for MyDD, Kevin Drum, a blogger for The Washington Monthly, and Andrew Sullivan also linked the presence of Republican-appointed coal mining executives in the MSHA to the tragedy.

Jack Spadaro, a former director of the National Mine Health and Safety Academy who was fired after participating as a whistleblower in a prior case involving the MSHA, made similar statements, referring to the current Bush administration's "reluctance to take the strong enforcement action that's sometimes necessary" in an appearance on the show Hannity & Colmes. Spadaro was criticized as "extreme left-wing" for his statements by host Sean Hannity.

The MSHA, on a "Questions and Answers" page regarding the incident, has strongly disputed many of these criticisms. In particular, the administration noted that the Sago mine was not an "accident waiting to happen" as the MSHA had never cited the mine for violations that would lead to "immediate risk of injury". It noted also that it had exercised its right to shut down various parts of the mine, eighteen times in 2005, until safety problems were corrected.

Most relevant to the criticisms discussed in this section, the MSHA explicitly disputed the suggestion that "MSHA has grown 'too soft' on mine operators and has not been aggressive enough in enforcing the Mine Act." It noted that between 2000 and 2005, the number of citations it had issued had increased by 4%, and the number of coal-mine specific citations had increased by 18%.

Dennis O'Dell, of the UMWA, disputed this response, suggesting that the fines MSHA handed to companies for these violations were too small to force action. A Knight Ridder "investigative report", published on January 7 and containing reference to the official MSHA response, concluded that "Since the Bush administration took office in 2001, it has been more lenient toward mining companies facing serious safety violations, issuing fewer and smaller major fines and collecting less than half of the money that violators owed."

=== Evaluation of media coverage ===
==== West Virginia University ====
On February 13, 2006, West Virginia University's Perley Isaac Reed School of Journalism convened a panel of six journalists for a forum titled "Searching for a Miracle: Media Coverage of the Sago Mine Disaster". According to the School's website, the forum covered the "challenges faced by journalists covering the story, the lessons they learned and the role that 24-hour news coverage may have played in one of the biggest media faux pas of the century".

Moderator Kelly McBride, Ethics Group Leader for Florida's Poynter Institute was quoted by the Charleston Gazette's February 14, 2006, story, "Forum at WVU examines media coverage of Sago Mine disaster" by Ry Rivard, as saying, "There were real people involved in this story. Real people who didn't deserve to become the epicenter of a news event ... Journalism is supposed to be a service to communities."

Mark Memmott, a media issues reporter for USA Today said, "Out there in the real world the story is that mines aren't safe, and why did it take so long for rescuers to get there ... Just because we did this panel doesn't mean we think the media blowing it is the big story." According to Memmott, The New York Times, without directly quoting Joe Thornton, West Virginia's deputy secretary for the Department of Military Affairs and Public Safety said Thornton had confirmed "rescued miners were being examined at the mine shortly before midnight and would soon be taken to nearby hospitals. Mr. Thornton said he did not know details of their medical condition".

C-SPAN's American Perspectives: Katrina Recovery & W.V. Mining Disaster aired the forum on February 18, 2006, and has a video of the forum available online as clip 24738.

== West Virginia legislation: SB 247 ==
After the Sago Mine disaster, the state legislature passed Governor Joe Manchin's SB247 on the January 23, 2006, the same day it was submitted. The bill created a new mine emergency-response system and required coal companies to provide miners with additional emergency air supplies, communications equipment and tracking devices. Manchin signed the bill into law on January 27, 2006. Provisions of the law and its history of passage are available on the state legislature's website.

=== Emergency rules ===
In a story in the Charleston Gazette on February 3, 2006, "Manchin mine rules contain no deadlines", staff writer Ken Ward Jr. reported on emergency rules filed February 1, 2006, with West Virginia Secretary of State Betty Ireland to implement the law.

The Manchin administration could have put the requirements into effect as soon as Ireland approved them, or in 42 days if she took no action. Manchin must have submitted the rules for a public comment period and revised them accordingly. The emergency rules could have remained in effect for 15 months. Final rules required legislative approval, which was likely to take place in the 2007 session.

== Federal legislation ==
=== S.2231 ===
On February 1, 2006, Senator Robert Byrd (D-WV) introduced a bill to direct the Secretary of Labor to prescribe additional coal mine safety standards and require additional penalties for habitual violators. The bill was referred to the Committee on Health, Education, Labor, and Pensions. Initial cosponsors were Democrats Richard Durbin (IL), Tom Harkin (IA), Ted Kennedy (MA), Barack Obama (IL) and Jay Rockefeller (WV). The status of the bill can be tracked on Congress.gov, the Library of Congress's legislative information system.

Senator Byrd outlined some of the provisions of the bill on his Senate website.

Statements made by Senators Byrd, Rockefeller, Reid and Kennedy regarding the introduction of this bill were published in the 2006 Congressional Record, pages S447 to S452.

- The bill would mandate equipment to communicate with miners, locate miners, and provide sufficient caches of air.
- Rescue teams must be staffed and on site.
- Operators must notify the MSHA immediately when there is an accident. Any coal operator who fails to do so will be subject to a $100,000 fine, and/or 12 to 15 years' imprisonment
- The bill would mandate a rapid notification and response system.
- The bill would create a new mandatory minimum penalty of $10,000 for coal operators that show "negligence or reckless disregard" for the safety standards of the Mine Act.
- The bill would nullify an MSHA rule issued in 2004 that authorizes the use of belt entries for ventilation, which may have caused fire in another accident at Alma.
- The bill would create a science and technology transfer office in MSHA to pull research and development ideas from other federal agencies for use in the mines.
- The bill would create an ombudsman in the Labor Department's Inspector General office for miners to report safety violations.

==== Office of Miners Health, Safety and Training (MHST) ====
In the first set of rules, the state Office of MHST will require caches of air supplies to give each miner at least 16 additional devices. Mines with coal seams taller than four feet (1.2 m) must have caches every 2,500 feet (760 m) in each working section. In smaller mines, there must be caches every 1,250 feet (380 m). Operators must submit plans for cache locations within 30 days for review and suggestions for change; however there is no deadline for equipping the mines with the caches.

Coal operators have no deadline to provide miners with improved rescue gear. It also sets no deadline for new communications equipment or tracking devices.

On February 2, 2003, MHST director Conaway said as soon as the equipment becomes available, "we're expecting them to be in the mines ... An operator is going to have to show us that they have it or that it's on order ... If they can't get them, they are going to have to show us that they have ordered them and that they are trying to get them".

According to Ward, Chris Hamilton, vice president of the West Virginia Coal Association, said "I know there are several months of backlog right now ... There is still some concern on the reliability of the wireless communications and tracking system ... A lot of that is still in the prototype stage and not commercially available".

This last statement contradicts the finding of a 2003 MSHA report, which called the systems "generally effective" and said the agency "encourages" their use.

==== Mine and Industrial Accident Rapid Response System ====
The West Virginia Division of Homeland Security proposes a rule that requests filed under the state FOIA "shall be held in abeyance until appropriate notification of next of kin of any deceased or victims that are grievously injured". The next of kin will have to give consent for the release of information.

Any requests for information about mine accidents reported to the new response system must include the "exact dates and times" of accidents and "the intended use of any information provided".

Jimmy Gianato, the state's homeland security director, said the language might need to be revised if questions are raised about properly responding to FOIA requests.

=== H.R. 4695 ===
On February 1, 2006, Representative Nick J. Rahall (D-WV) filed companion legislation in the House of Representatives, where it was referred to the House Committee on Education and the Workforce. Cosponsors were Shelley Moore Capito (R-WV) and Alan B. Mollohan (D-WV). Current status is found by searching on the bill number on Thomas, the Library of Congress's legislative information system. The Congressional Record for Rahall's comments is found on page H127. His extended comments are found on pages E 46 and 47.

== Rule changes for the Mine Safety and Health Act of 1977 ==
=== Emergency temporary rules for mine operators ===
On March 9, 2006, David G. Dye, acting assistant secretary of labor for mine safety and health, announced that MSHA was invoking a power that had only been invoked twice since its formation in 1978.

"This ... will require the use of proven technologies and techniques to help miners evacuate quickly and safely after a mine accident ... We are using the emergency temporary standard to get help into the field as fast as possible." The proposed rules were published in the Federal Register.

- Self-contained self rescue devices (SCSRs): Provide additional SCSRs for each miner underground in a storage area to be readily accessible in an emergency.
- Lifelines Install lifelines in all primary and alternate escape routes to help guide miners when visibility is poor.
- Miner training Quarterly emergency evacuation drills on transferring from one SCSR to another.
- Accident Notification Informing MSHA of an accident within 15 minutes

=== Omega Block moratorium ===
After a second mine accident, which resulted in five deaths in which the foam blocks did not withstand an explosion at the Kentucky Darby, LLC Mine No. 1 in Harlan, Kentucky, David Dye, Acting MSHA director, announced a moratorium on the use of the blocks and a requirement to test for methane build up behind the seals.

Writing about the announcement in his May 23, 2006, article, "Mine sealer banned", Brian Bowling of the Pittsburgh Tribune Review noted that "Officials at International Coal Group, which owns the Sago Mine, contend the agency's 20-pounds-per-square-inch standard is inadequate. The Ashland, Kentucky, company hired a structural engineer, who determined explosive forces in the West Virginia mine reached as high as 60 to 90 psi".

This assertion was made by the company in its March 14, 2006, news release announcing the reopening of the mine and the findings of its initial study of reasons for the accident.

== In popular culture ==
The band Trailer Choir's song "What Would You Say" is a song about the Sago Mine Disaster. The following words appear in the song: "13 men felt trapped in a mine in West Virginia,/only one made it out alive/but their love lives on in the words/I can not wait to see you on the other side."

The song "American Gold" written by native West Virginian Joe Cerisanoincludes the following lines: "You better swallow hard so your ears'll pop Goin' down this deep is a helluva' drop And if the roof caves in that's all she wrote That's why in his top pocket there's a goodbye note"

The song "Sago Mine" by Pete and Maura Kennedy appears on The Kennedys album Better Dreams. They write in the liner notes: "We were in West Virginia while this was happening, and the manipulation of the hopes of the townspeople gave an extra overlay of tragedy to the event."

The song "Fewer Afraid" by The World Is a Beautiful Place & I Am No Longer Afraid to Die references the disaster with the line "explosions in Sago, Vs trailer park labs".

== See also ==
- Aracoma Alma Mine accident (January 19, 2006)
- Mining accident
- Quecreek Mine rescue (July 2002)

== Sources ==
- ABC News; January 3, 2006, Rescuers Break Ground in Miner Mission.
- Associated Press; January 5, 2006, The Victims. The New York Times.
- Barnes, Jonathan; January 5, 2006, West Virginia mine rescue makes slow progress. (Reuters) Times of Malta.
- BBC News and Current Affairs; January 3, 2006, Hopes fade for trapped US miners.
- BBC News and Current Affairs; January 4, 2006, Last push to save trapped miners.
- BBC News and Current Affairs; January 4, 2006, 'Miraculous' rescue for US miners.
- BBC News and Current Affairs; January 4, 2006, Only one US miner reported alive.
- BBC News and Current Affairs; January 4, 2006, US mine 'rescue' turns to tragedy.
- BBC News and Current Affairs; January 4, 2006, Fury over US mine 'rescue' fiasco.
- BBC News and Current Affairs; January 4, 2006, Mine families' anger at 'lies'.
- BBC News and Current Affairs; January 4, 2006, West Virginia's devastated community.
- BBC News and Current Affairs; January 6, 2006, Crucial hours for mine survivor.
- Bowling, Brian and Conti, David; January 2, 2006, Condition of trapped miners in West Virginia unknown. Pittsburgh Tribune-Review.
- Breed, Allen; January 4, 2006, Families Say 12 W.Va. Miners Found Alive. Associated Press.
- The Republican Mine Disaster: Blood on their Hands
- CNN.com; January 2, 2006, Rescue teams creep toward trapped coal miners.
- CNN.com; January 4, 2006, Family members say 12 miners found alive.
- CNN.com; January 4, 2006, 'Believe in miracles': 12 miners found alive.
- CNN.com; January 4, 2006, Grief, anger as all but one miner found dead.
- CNN.com; January 4, 2006, Quecreek 'miracle' offered Sago families false hope
- CNN.com. January 18, 2006, Doctor: Sago survivor awakening from coma
- Dao, James; January 3, 2006, Blast Traps 13 in a Coal Mine in West Virginia. The New York Times.
- Duke, Armando; January 2, 2006, Explosion at W. VA Coal Mine Traps Workers. AXcessNews.com.
- Finn, Scott; January 16, 2006, 'They're West Virginians' State celebrates lives of 12 fallen miners. The Charleston Gazette.
- Freeman, Simon and Agencies; January 4, 2006, Turmoil for miners' families after disaster yields sole survivor. Times Online.
- Gustafson, Dave; January 4, 2006, Only 1 survives: Family members had thought for 3 hours that 12 were alive. The Charleston Gazette.
- McLachlan, Justin; January 3, 2006, West Virginia mine explosion, my time there. Fifteen-minutes.net.
- Report of Investigation: Fatal Underground Coal Mine Explosion, January 2, 2006; Sago Mine, Wolf Run Mining Company; Tallmansville, Upshur County, West Virginia (Report). Arlington, VA: U.S. Mine Safety and Health Administration. May 9, 2007.
- Mine Safety and Health Administration; March 9, 2006, "Emergency Mine Evacuation" Federal Register, pp. 12252–12271.
- Mine Safety and Health Administration; March 9, 2006, "MSHA pursues new mine evacuation rules: Special rulemaking action used only twice before." Press release.
- Staff Reports; January 4, 2006 Single Miner Survives Explosion. The Record Delta Online (Upshur County, WV publication).
- Tyson, Ann Scott and Vedantam, Shankar; January 3, 2006, W. Va. Mine Explosion Traps 13. Washington Post.
- Tyson, Ann Scott and Barbash, Fred; January 4, 2006, 12 Found Dead in W.Va. Coal Mine. Washington Post.
- Ward, Ken Jr.; January 3, 2006 Sago mine has history of roof falls. The Charleston Gazette.
- Yates, Jennifer; January 3, 2006, Company discouraged by air quality where 13 coal miners trapped, Associated Press.
- Hate group changes plans, opposition offers tips for community. The Record Delta.
- "March 2, 2006, Hearing on the State of Mine Safety and Health". Website of the United States Senate Committee on Health Educations Labor and Pensions (HELP). Archived from the original on May 17, 2006.
