= Ben Hatfield =

Ben Hatfield may refer to:

- Ben Hatfield, see Sago Mine disaster
- Ben Hatfield, character in The Feed (British TV series)
