= International Coal Group =

Subsidiary of Arch Coal, Inc

International Coal Group, Inc.
- Type: Public
- Traded as: NYSE: ICO
- Industry: Coal mining
- Founded: Acquisition of many assets of Horizon Natural Resources at bankruptcy auction (May 2004)
- Headquarters: Teays Valley, West Virginia, United States
- Key people: Wilbur L. Ross, Jr., Chairman; Bennett K. Hatfield, President/CEO
- Products: Coal
- Revenue: $647.7 million U.S dollars (2005)
- Number of employees: 1,425 (2004)
- Website: www.intlcoal.com (Now redirects to Arch Coal's website)

International Coal Group, Inc. (ICG), is a company headquartered in Teays Valley, West Virginia that was incorporated in May 2004 by WL Ross & Co for the sole purpose of acquiring certain assets of Horizon. ICG eventually operated 12 mining complexes in Northern and Central Appalachia (Kentucky, Maryland, and West Virginia) and one complex in the Illinois Basin. In November 2005, ICG had a stock offering on the New York Stock Exchange. In 2011 ICG became a subsidiary of Arch Coal, Inc in 2011.

== History ==
Wilbur Ross's WL Ross & Co and other investors established the International Coal Group, Inc. (ICG) in May 2004 with the intention of purchasing distressed coal companies, then restructuring them to operate more competitively.

In August 2004 Wilbur Ross's Newcoal LLC and Oldcoal LLC, in partnership with A.T. Massey Coal Company acquired the assets of the bankrupt Horizon Natural Resources, the fourth largest coal company in the United States. for $786 million. On August 9, 2004, U.S. Bankruptcy Judge William Howard ruled that Ross, would "not have to honor union contracts that guaranteed benefits for 1,000 active miners and some 2,300 retirees." The United Mine Workers of America staged a protest in response. Newcoal LLC was only interested in acquiring Horizon's nonunion properties.

When the International Coal Group, Inc. acquired the assets of Horizon Natural Resources it changed its name to ICG, Inc. in September 2004.

In a letter to shareholders ICG Chairman Ross, announced that ICG had agreed to acquire Anker Coal Group, Inc. and CoalQuest Development LLC with the transaction being carried out through a holding company reorganization. Through the reorganization the "existing International Coal Group, Inc." changed its name to "ICG, Inc." A new company called "International Coal Group, Inc." will be the holding company for ICG, Anker and CoalQuest. Shareholders who have shares of the "old International Coal Group" created in 2004 will receive shares of International Coal Group, Inc., the new holding company created in 2005 in a "one-for-one tax-free exchange". The directors and officers of old International Coal Group will become the directors and officers of International Coal Group, Inc., the new holding company.

On June 15, 2011, Arch Coal acquired International Coal Group through a merger for $3.4 billion. ICG became a wholly owned subsidiary of Arch Coal. Coal prices were rising as demand for coal from China and India were increasing. The merged company is the second-largest coking-coal producer in the United States.

By 2006, W.L. Ross & Co. owned 13.7% of the ICG shares which were then valued at about $200 million.

== Sago Mine disaster ==
ICG operates the mine in Sago, West Virginia where at approximately 6:30 a.m. on January 2, 2006, 13 coal miners were trapped after an explosion in the Sago Mine disaster. Twelve miners were later found to have died, while one survivor, Randal McCloy Jr., was taken to a hospital in critical condition. ICG faced controversy after an initial report claimed 12 of the trapped miners had been found alive. According to an article in the Wall Street Journal ICG gave an initial donation of $2 million to support the families of the victims. According to a January 27, 2008 article in the Pittsburgh Post, McCloy Jr. and the family of one of the victims settled lawsuits against ICG. The lawsuits "alleged negligence by ICG and the other companies, including alleged failure to maintain a safe working environment."

In 2005, the mine was cited by the federal Mine Safety and Health Administration (MSHA) 208 times for violating regulations, up from 68 in 2004. Of those, 96 were considered significant/serious and substantial (S&S). According to a January 4, 2006 article in the New York Times, federal records showed that their inspectors had fined the Sago mine "more than $24,000 for roughly 202 violations in 2005". Anindya Mohinta, a London-based mining analyst with J.P. Morgan, questioned Ross for investing so heavily in the coal industry "because of myriad government safety and environmental regulations" the coal industry "requires so much capital investment to improve bankrupt assets." Mohinta said that the "human risks of investing in businesses like coal mines have an "act of God" component and it is risky for new companies in the sector to know where and when to spend money for maintenance and prevention."

In late November of early December 2005, ICG acquired Anker West Virginia Mining Company Inc who had been the official mine operator of Sago Mine. The official Sago Mine operator became Wolf Run Mining Company in late 2005. Wolf Run Mining Company was a subsidiary of Hunter Ridge Mining Company, which in turn was a subsidiary of the parent company ICG according to Vice President Sam Kitts in his testimony before the Mine Safety and Health Administration (MSHA) hearing on March 23, 2006. Kitts identified Ben Hatfield as his supervisor during the period of transition from Anker to ICG. ICG was in the process of acquiring Anker in November 2005.

== Clean Water Act ==
In 2010 Appalachian Voices and the Waterkeeper Alliance alleged they found false pollution reports by ICG and Frasure Creek disguising thousands of CWA violations. They alleged the companies deliberately cut and pasted data from one report to subsequent reports.

— Richmond Register 2012

In 2012 four groups including the Waterkeeper Alliance and Kentuckians for the Commonwealth, Appalachian Voices, Kentucky Riverkeeper and three private citizens won an historic settlement in the Franklin Circuit Court with the Energy and Environment Cabinet and ICG that "addresses water pollution and false reporting by the International Coal Group". The lawsuit revealed a lack of state oversight, inaccurate water monitoring reports, and noncompliance with the Clean Water Act in the coal industry in Kentucky. In late 2010 as reports of the violations were revealed, the state of Kentucky clamped down on ICG. With accurate reporting in place, water pollution violations by ICG were revealed. The proposed settlement of $575,000 that ICG has agreed to pay includes a fine of $225,000. The settlement includes third-party auditing of ICG's water monitoring. The money "will be used to monitor and clean up polluted waterways in eastern Kentucky." ICG will pay $335,000 to Kentucky PRIDE to use toward eliminating residential "straight pipes" dumping sewage into streams."

== Bennett K. Hatfield ==
Ben Hatfield was President and CEO of ICG in 2006. Hatfield had management positions at Arch Coal, Massey Energy and until his resignation in 2015, he was president and CEO of Patriot Coal. Patriot filed for Chapter 11 bankruptcy protection in the month following Hatfield's resignation. He was also a member of the West Virginia Coal Association board. In May 2016 59-year-old Bennett K. Hatfield was shot and killed by twenty-year-old Anthony R. Arriaga of Gibsanburg, Ohio in what appeared to be a bungled robbery attempt.

== See also ==
- Arch Coal
