= Frasure Creek lawsuit =

Kentucky environmental lawsuit

The Frasure Creek lawsuit was a legal action by environmental organizations Waterkeeper Alliance and Appalachian Voices against Frasure Creek Mining and International Coal Group (ICG) on grounds of falsifying pollution discharge in their reports. This violated many key components of the Clean Water Act (CWA), which controls and regulates many types of pollution entering into waterway. Individual citizens joined the environmental organizations to sue the coal mining companies under the CWA. The Kentucky Energy and Environment Cabinet attempted to settle in Franklin Circuit Court in December, 2010 but was denied. The case moved forward to the Kentucky Supreme Court in April, 2012 who agreed with lower court rulings that Appalachian Voices and others were legally supported by the CWA to intervene in the lawsuit against Frasure Creek Mining and ICG.

== Frasure Creek history ==
Found in McDowell Floyd County, Kentucky, Frasure Creek, officially known as Frasure Creek Mining LLC, was a Surface mining/Mountaintop removal mining location in Eastern Kentucky counties of Floyd, Magoffin, Pike, and Knott. This mine was formerly the largest producer of coal in the state of Kentucky Coal mining in Kentucky however after being cited for nearly 20,000 violations of the clean water act, the mine had a maximum penalty of 700 million dollars for shutting down the mine.

== Frasure Creek Mining lawsuit ==
In 2010, environmental organizations Appalachian Voices and Waterkeeper Alliance had reason to believe that Frasure Creek Mining and International Coal Group (ICG) were falsifying reports and violating permit limits. Frasure Creek Mining was accused of having close to 20,000 violations of the Clean Water Act. The Clean Water Act (CWA), previously known as the Federal Water Pollution Control Act of 1948, was amended in 1972 with growing environmental concerns in the United States. For years, Frasure Creek Mining and ICG were suspected of falsifying pollution discharge by reporting the same numbers but changing the dates. The coalition of environmental organizations including Appalachian Voices, Waterkeeper Alliance, Kentuckians for the Commonwealth and Kentucky Riverkeeper moved forward to sue Frasure Creek and ICG with support from citizens in October, 2010. Legal representations for the groups included Pace Law School Environmental Litigation, Appalachian Citizens' Law Center and Waterworth Law Office. The Kentucky Energy and Environment Cabinet attempted to reach a settlement before a federal lawsuit ensued in Franklin Circuit Court December, 2010. Judge Phillip Sheperd denied these settlements, agreeing with the environmental organizations that fines would not prevent future violations from the companies who had already failed to comply previously. On April 26, 2012, the Kentucky State Supreme Court also agreed with lower court rulings that Appalachian Voices, Kentucky Riverkeepers and others were supported by the Clean Water Act to intervene in the lawsuit. The Clean Water Act allows public enforcement on standards and regulations, established and assisted by the Administrator and the States.

== Broken regulations and the effects of Frasure Creek Mining ==
The tens of thousands falsified data measurements that Frasure Creek reported to the state of Kentucky in and around 2010 included over 200,000 data points that broke multiple rules and regulations within the Clean Water Act. Coal companies, like Frasure Creek, are required to report water quality data for runoff. Because the only measurements of water quality that were taken were proven inaccurate or completely reused from previous monthly reports, it is unclear what the true damage was to the environment and watershed in and around Frasure creek mine. Remediation processes are still being monitored by the Environmental Protection Agency (EPA) and other environmental groups like Appalachian Voices to ensure and prevent no further leakage .

== Settlement of the Frasure Creek case ==
After a five-year battle against a large number of environmental groups, Frasure Creek Mining company and Kentucky's Energy and Environmental Cabinet agreed on a settlement on Dec. 7th, 2015. Frasure Creek Mining complied with a settlement agreeing to pay $500,000.This also includes a potential $6 million fine if the company does not abide by the guidelines of the deal. With years of violations of the Clean Water Act, Frasure Creek was issued the largest fine ever entered by the state of Kentucky for environmental violations against any company. Following the settlement, if at any point Frasure Creek mining company or any of its owners want to apply for new permits, a fine of $2.75 million must be paid. The company is also affiliated with two others, Trinity Coal Corporation and New Trinity Coal. These companies and their owners also agreed to pay the fine for future permits. Frasure Creek had already transferred their permits over a month before the settlement was reached. Otherwise, their mining application will not be processed by the state. By doing this, the settlement forced Frasure Creek to leave the state of Kentucky or pay a detrimental fine. From 2010 through 2014, various environmental groups claimed numerous cases water-monitoring data had been falsely submitted to the state. Part of the settlement was Frasure Creek had to admit to these violations at surface mines in Perry, Magoffin, Pike, and Floyd county, with the total number rising to the thousands. Many leaders of the environmental groups that fought against Frasure Creek thought the settlement was a strong one and that it sent a strong signal that citizens will continue to hold the state accountable to ensure communities and water remain healthy.
