= Hurricane Creek mine disaster =

1970 mining accident near Hyden, Kentucky, U.S.

Coordinates: 37°07′43.4″N 83°20′52.0″W

The Hurricane Creek mine disaster occurred at the Finley Mine near Hyden, Kentucky, USA, on December 30, 1970, shortly after noon and resulted in the deaths of 38 men. As was often pointed out in coverage of the disaster, it occurred a year to the day after the passage of the Coal Mine Safety and Health Act of 1969. Recovery was complicated by the fact that a foot of snow fell on the rural mountain roads at the time of the accident.

It was the deadliest mine disaster in the United States since the Farmington Mine disaster in 1968, and is the subject of Tom T. Hall's song "Trip to Hyden". Other songs about the disaster include "The Hyden Miners' Tragedy" by J. D. Jarvis, issued as a 45 RPM on the independent Sunrise label (Hamilton, Ohio), and "The Caves of Jericho" by The Band from the album Jericho, released November 2, 1993 under the Rhino label.

== Mine conditions ==
The disaster occurred in shafts 15 and 16 of a "truck mine" just outside the town of Hyden, Kentucky, owned by Charles and Stanley Finley, which had opened the previous March on leased land, although their company had been mining in the area for ten years. The small operation involved about 170 employees who were not members of United Mine Workers. Thirty-four infractions had been reported in its first three months of operation but they had been fixed, and the mine had been shut down for 3 days in June because of safety concerns.

The Bureau of Mines had declared the mine an "imminent danger" because of blasting safety hazards in November 1970 but allowed the mine to continue operation. The hazards, which included excess accumulation of coal dust and electrical spark hazards, were discovered on November 19 and ordered to be cleaned up by December 22, but the agency was short of inspectors and could not reinspect on that date as was required by law. The understaffed agency needed about 750 inspectors but only had 499 at the time of the disaster.

The conditions would have allowed the bureau to declare the mine "excessively hazardous" and conduct inspections every 10 days but they chose not to do so. The mine owners had been blamed by inspectors for the crushing death of a worker on November 9, saying the owners had failed to make required repairs to the underground tractor involved in the accident.

This lack of enforcement of the new mining safety law was part of a wider problem protested by members of Congress, and union miners had gone on strike that summer to protest the lack of enforcement. The understaffed agency had, at the time of the Hurricane Creek disaster, failed to issue a single fine despite citing thousands of safety violations at dozens of coal mines.

== Disaster ==
On December 30, 1970, the 38 day shift workers entered the 36" tall mine shaft at 7 a.m. and crawled to a depth of about 2,400 feet. The explosion occurred at about 12:10 p.m. The bodies were removed within 24 hours and the mine was sealed until an investigation could begin. A survivor, A. T. Collins, was reentering the shaft after a lunch break and was blown out of the mine by the explosion. There was one other survivor, Harrison Henson of Clay County, who had been sent outside to get tools. He had turned around to go back in only to see the mine explode in front of him. Collins was one of three miners who testified that he had seen primer cord – an illegal fuse – at the mine site.

Illegal primer cord was found in the December 30 blast site, as well as at the site of a December 22 blast at the mine.

According to a memoir by James D. Ausenbaugh, who was editor of the Courier-Journal's state desk at the time of the disaster, one of the mine owners complained at the mine site about the 1969 mine safety law and those who had supported it. One of the bystanders, Leslie County Judge George Wooton, confronted the owner and beat him bloody. The owner was carried from the mine site and Wooton never faced any charges.

== Reaction ==
President Richard Nixon quickly issued a statement offering sympathy to family and friends of the deceased miners, and promised to take "every appropriate step" to prevent future disasters. He dispatched some of his top aides, including Robert Finch.

Charles Finley went on trial for negligent operation of the mine in February 1972.

== Disaster aftermath ==
The bodies were taken to a grade school gymnasium in Hyden. Many bodies had been so damaged in the blast that they could only be identified by social security numbers written on their belts. Most of the miners came from Clay and Leslie counties, two of the poorest in the state, and the New York Times described their economy at the time by saying "there is little industry but coal". In an interview with correspondent Bill Walker of CBS News, the foreman's widow was asked if she held the Finleys responsible for killing her husband. She said, "no" and paused, then stated,'"No more than if they'd held a gun to his head." This was the first time anyone related to the blast spoke out. Her husband, she went on to reveal, had spoken of the mine violations both the owner and federal government had let slide in the name of expediency and jobs.

The House Labor Subcommittee held a week-long inquiry into the disaster in March 1971. Chuck Finley, the mine's owner, appeared only when subpoenaed, and denied any knowledge of the illegal primer cord, including testimony from a mine worker who claimed to have told Finley about the cord a few weeks earlier. Finley also denied claims raised in earlier testimony that he had bribed a mine inspector. He was questioned by Romano L. Mazzoli of Louisville, who had just begun what would be a long career in the House of Representatives.

== Mine Memorial ==
The Hurricane Creek Mine Memorial commemorates the explosion and was built on the site of the Finley Mine. The memorial was planned by the friends and families of the lost miners to honor them. The state legislature approved the legislation to build the memorial to honor the miners on the 40th anniversary of the mine explosion. The dedication of the memorial took place during the opening ceremony on October 8, 2011, at approximately 1 p.m.

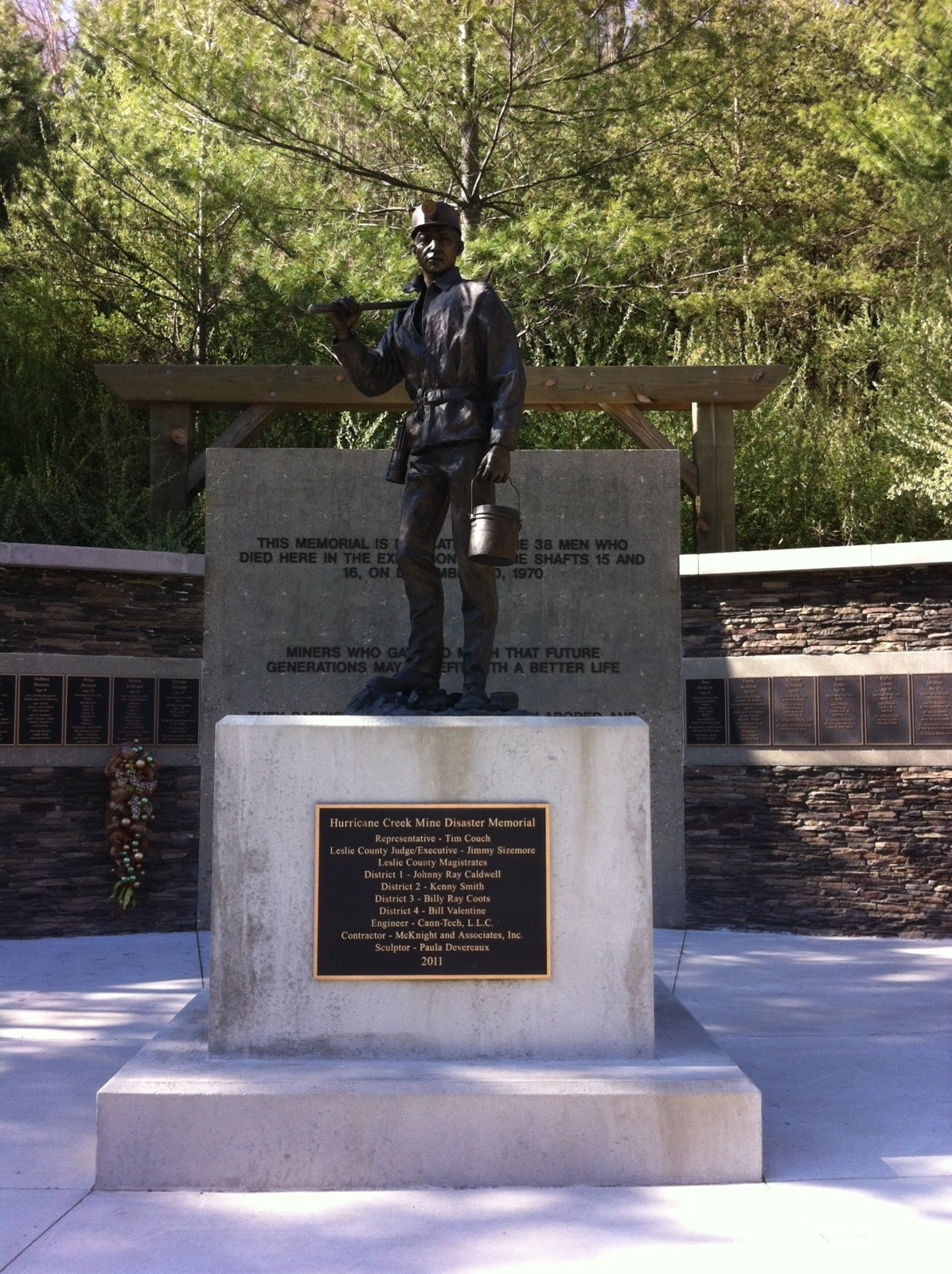
Mine Memorial

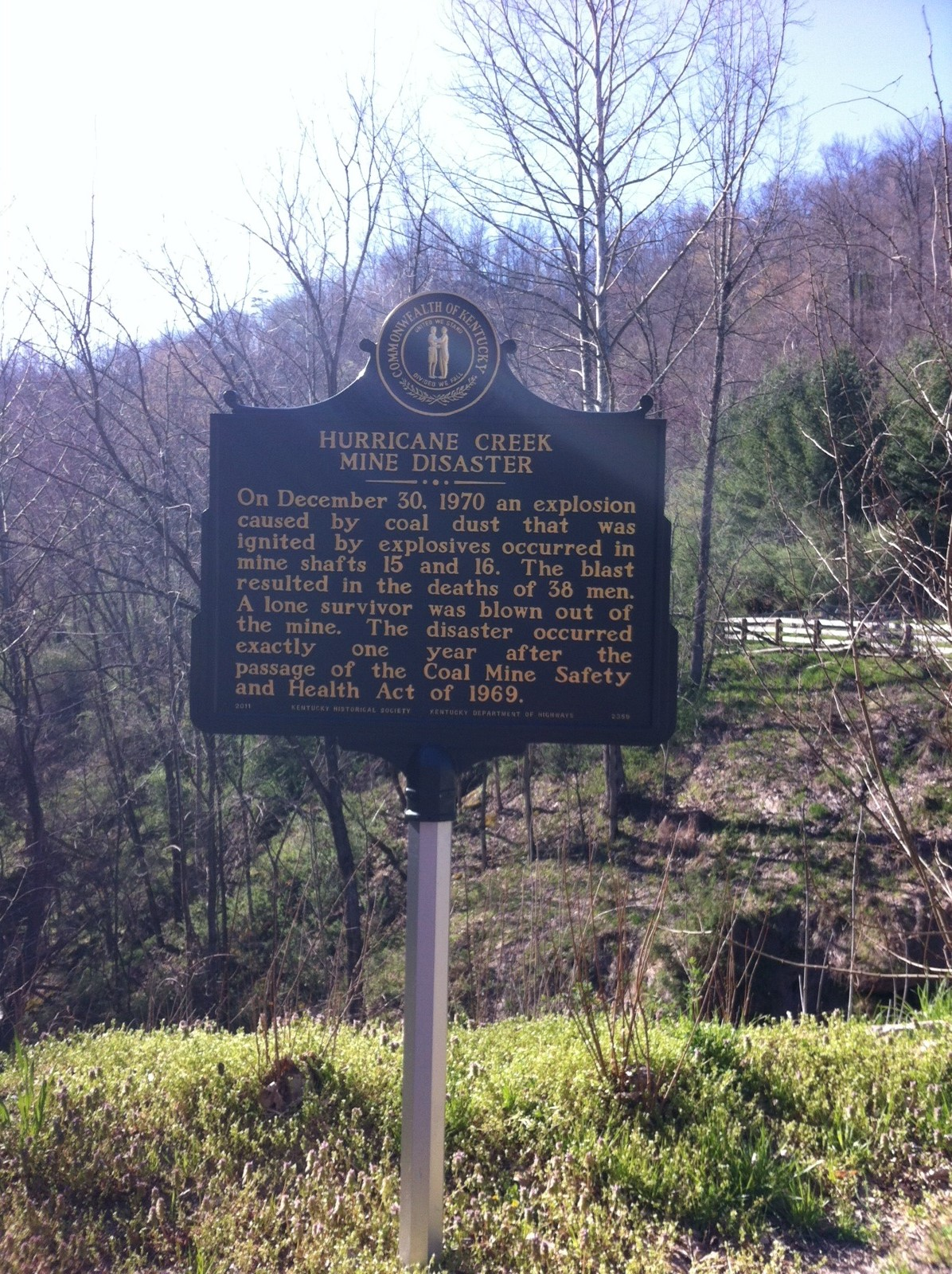
Sign at memorial site

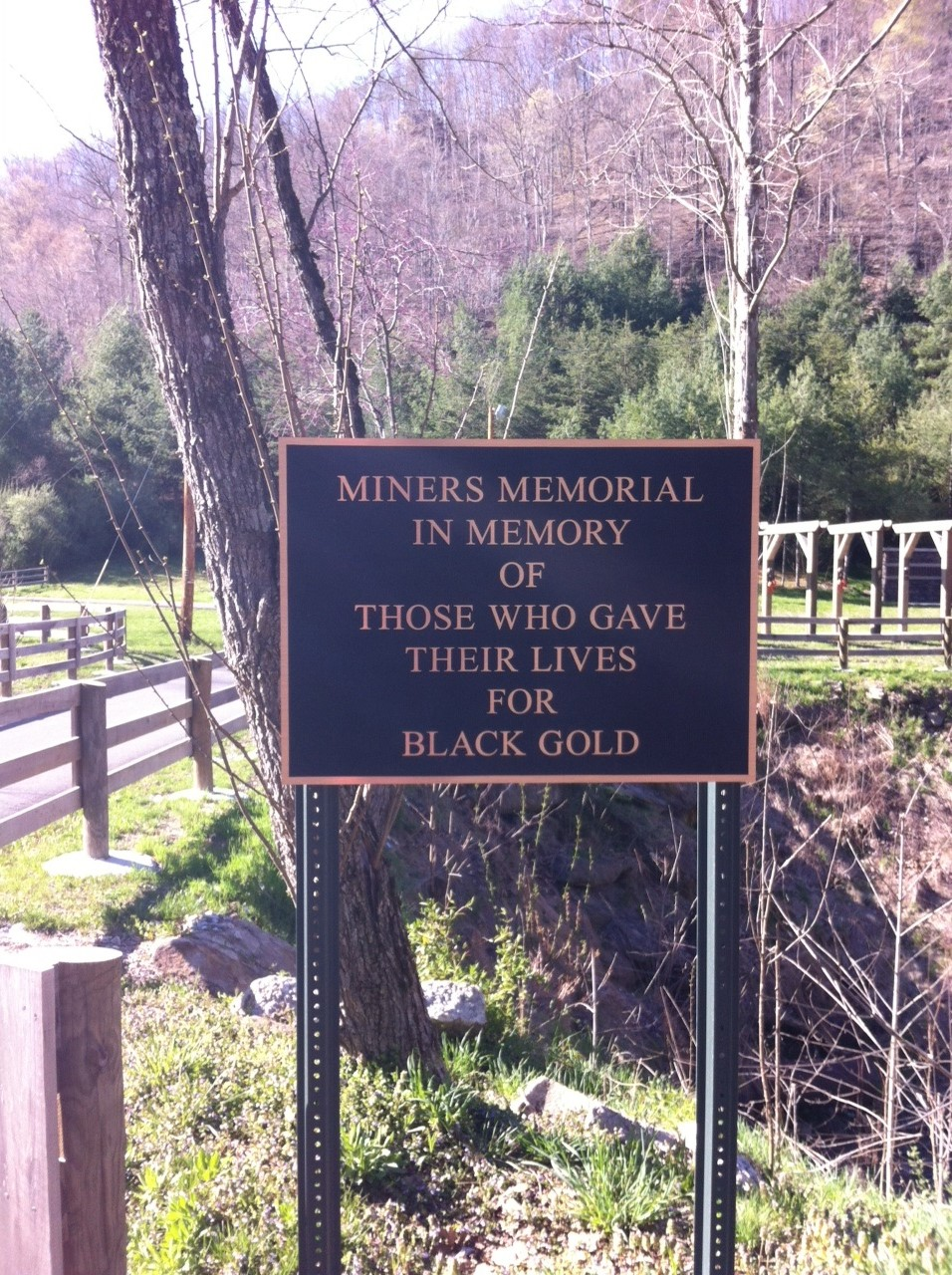
Mine Memorial sign

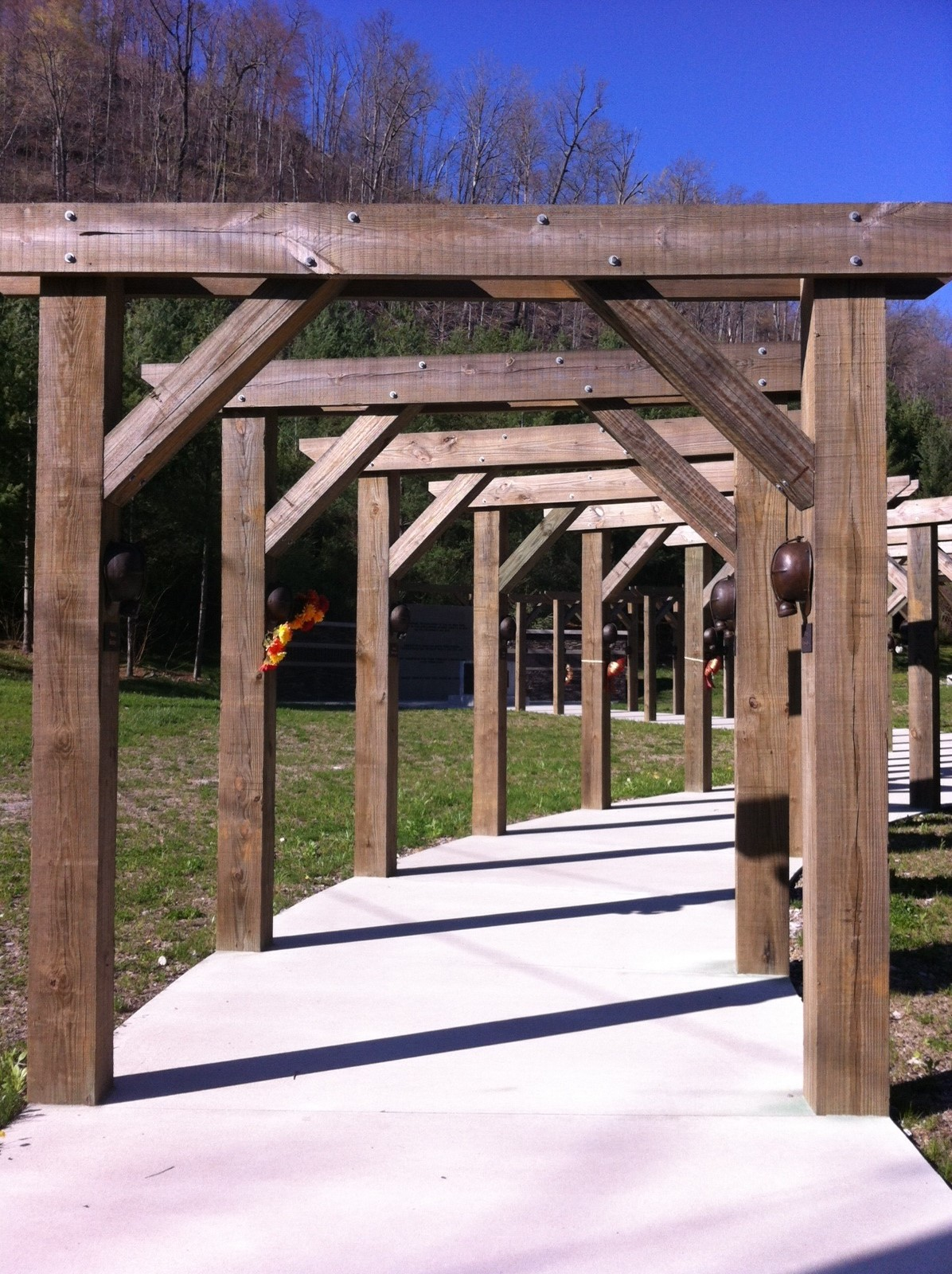
Miner's Hard Hats

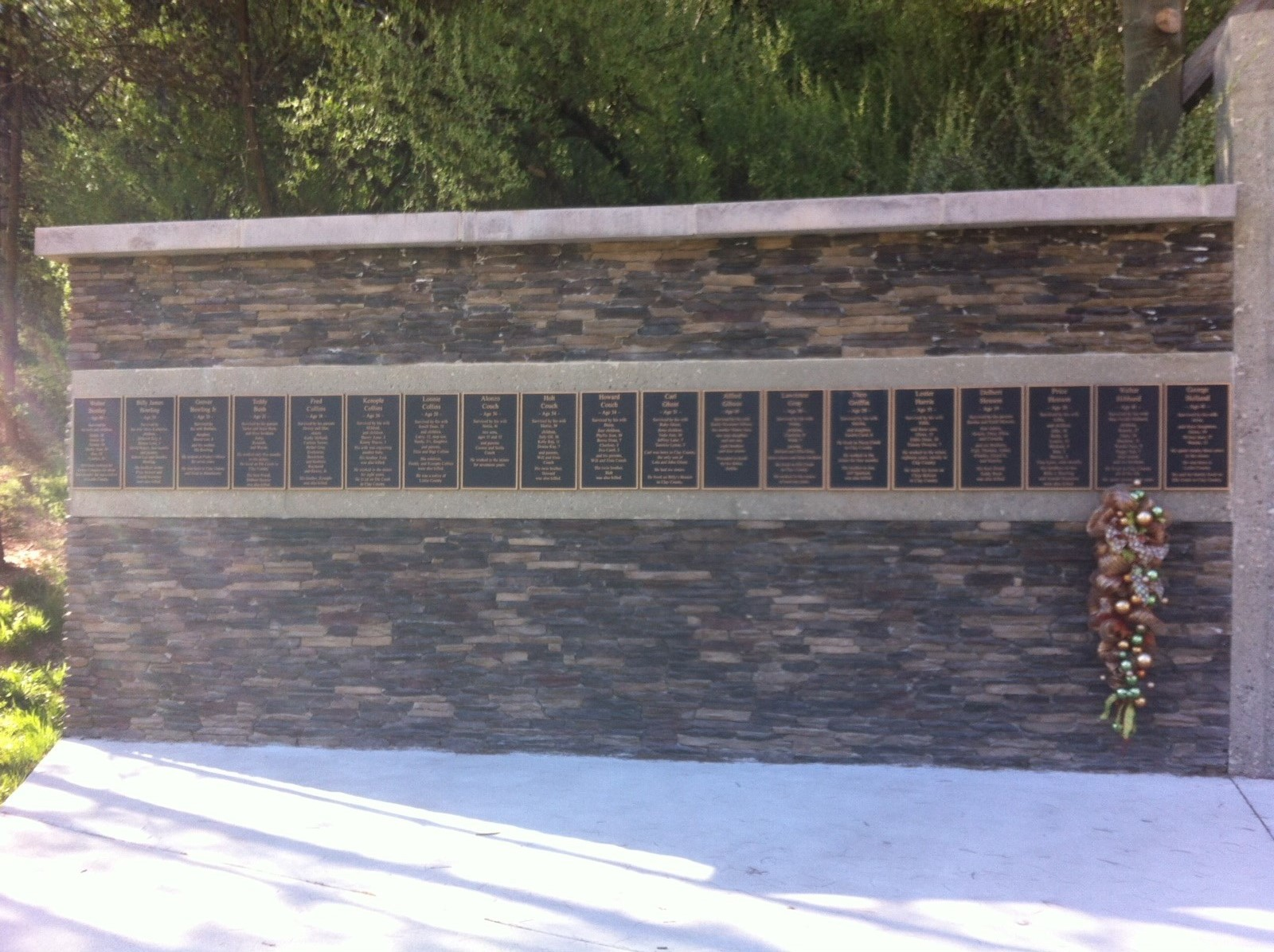
Names of miners

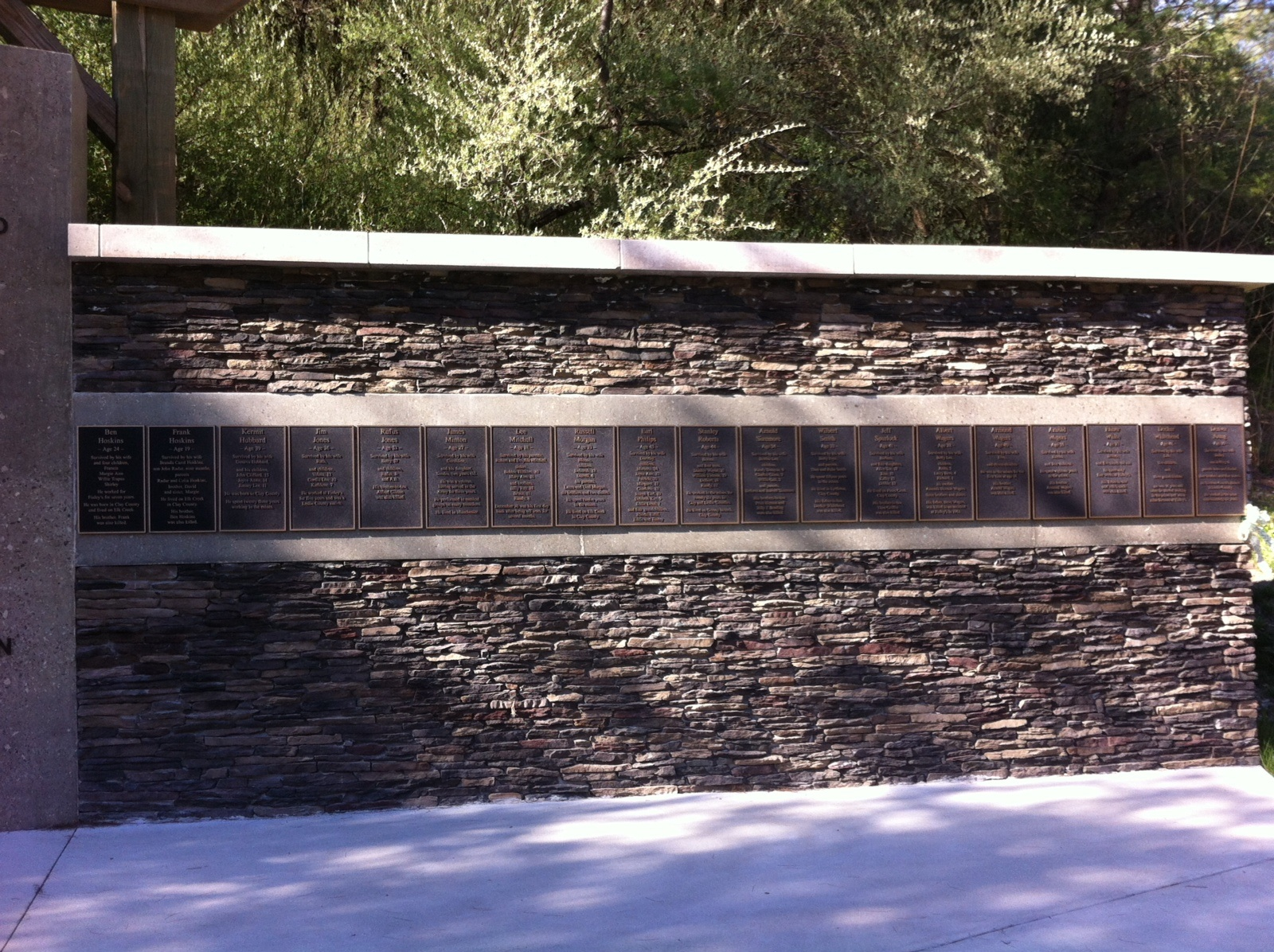
Miner's names

== Memorial Information ==
The funding for the memorial was made possibly from state and local funding. House Bill 420 was passed in 2010 allowing the historical memorial to be built. The estimated completion time was April 2011, only a few months after this the memorial was opened. The memorial consists of a walkway with thirty eight wooden gates, each with a hanging coal miner hat, to honor each coal miner who died in the explosion, a bronze statue of a coal miner, and two walls that consist of the names of the thirty- eight coal miners who lost their lives and information about each of them. While there was one survivor, he was recognized as well; there is a plaque placed on the statue of the coal miner with his name and information about him.
