= Mine Safety and Health News =

- Type: Bi-weekly newsletter
- Owner: Legal Publication Services
- Editor: Ellen Smith
- Language: English
- Headquarters: Pittsford, NY
- ISSN: 1072-768X
- Website: www.minesafety.com

Mine Safety and Health News is the only credentialed, independent reporting service in the U.S. covering the Mine Safety and Health Administration and the Federal Mine Safety and Health Review Commission. It is not affiliated with any mining organization, lobbying group, policy group, labor or political organization, or mining company. It does not accept advertising and is strictly a subscription-based news and research publication.

== Awards ==
2014 Awards for Special Report in partnership with National Public Radio on mine operators who refuse or can't pay MSHA fines. "Delinquent MSHA Fines Leaves Deadly and Crippling Legacies." Edward R. Murrow Award for Investigative Reporting from the Radio Television Digital News Association; Investigative Reporters and Editors Investigative Journalism Award; Specialized Information Publishers Association David Swit Award for Investigative Journalism and APEX Award for News Writing; National Press Club Award for Newsletter Analytical Reporting.

The Newsletter & Electronic Publishers Foundation's "excellence in newsletter journalism" competition awarded Mine Safety and Health News a 2nd place prize in Best Investigative Reporting in 2003; 1st Place Award for Best Interpretative Reporting 2006; 2nd place prize in Best Instructional Reporting in 2007; 1st Place Best Interpretive or Analytical Reporting in 2011;

In March 2006 the Washington Monthly awarded Mine Safety and Health News its Monthly Journalism Award which is presented each month to "one or more newspaper, magazine, radio, or television stories (or series of stories) that demonstrate a commitment to the public interest ... particularly reporting that explains the successes and failures of government agencies at all levels."

Its staff was awarded the Society of Professional Journalists Sigma Delta Chi Award for Public Service in Newsletter Journalism in July 2007, for the coverage of the 2006 Sago Mine Disaster in West Virginia that left 12 miners dead. "The judges lauded their coverage as informative and complete and in no way was led by the 'disaster pack' of national media covering the disaster. It provides its readers with insights and details not found in other coverage".

It was again awarded the Sigma Delta Chi Award for Public Service in Newsletter Journalism in July 2008, for the coverage of the 2007 Crandall Canyon Mine Disaster in Utah that ultimately left 9 people dead. The judges said they "provided much needed context ... including information about the mine owner's controversial history with safety violations."

Smith was awarded the Sigma Delta Chi Award for Public Service in Newsletter Journalism in 1989 when she was the editor of the former publication Mine Regulation Reporter, for coverage of the 1989 Pyro Mining Co. Williams Station Mine Disaster.

In 2008, an editorial entitled "High Negligence and Reckless Disregard," was given the Magnum Opus "Gold Award" for best signed editorial or essay. In it, Smith was highly critical of the Mine Safety and Health Administration allowing reporters and camera crews into the Crandall Canyon Mine just days after a disaster trapped two miners and the mine was unstable. Four days after her editorial was published, the mine experienced a huge coal burst that killed 6 rescuers.

Mine Safety and Health News has also received several APEX Awards for Publication Excellence (1996, 2003, 2004, 2006, 2007, 2015).

== Special Projects ==
Worked with Global News - 16X9 program highlighting concerns in the Donkin Mine Project in Nova Scotia, where a company owned by U.S. coal operator Chris Cline seeks to mine metallurgical coal almost 2,000 feet under the Atlantic Ocean. Smith pointed to problems in Cline's mines in the U.S., specifically the MC#1 Mine that has continuous and recurring serious mining violations. Smith also questioned the "due diligence" in the report prepared for the Canadian government, which seems to gloss over some of the more serious problems with Cline's mine in the United States. See: http://globalnews.ca/news/2654293/donkin-coal-mine-in-cape-breton-to-open-this-summer-amid-safety-concerns-from-critics/

Worked in partnership with National Public Radio finding hundreds of mine operators owing millions in delinquent mine safety penalties. While this was a story covered for years by Mine Safety and Health News, NPR's team was able to download massive data sets from the government to show that mines with delinquent MSHA penalties had accident rates 50% to 70% higher than mines who pay their fines. See: http://www.minesafety.com/investigation-finds-70-million-in-unpaid-fines-leaves-deadly-and-crippling-legacies/

== Staff ==
- Ellen Smith, owner and managing editor has been covering mining-related issues since 1987
- Katherine Snyder, Washington, D.C. correspondent is a former MSHA employee with 25 years experience in MSHA.
