= Sago, West Virginia =

Sago
- Unincorporated community
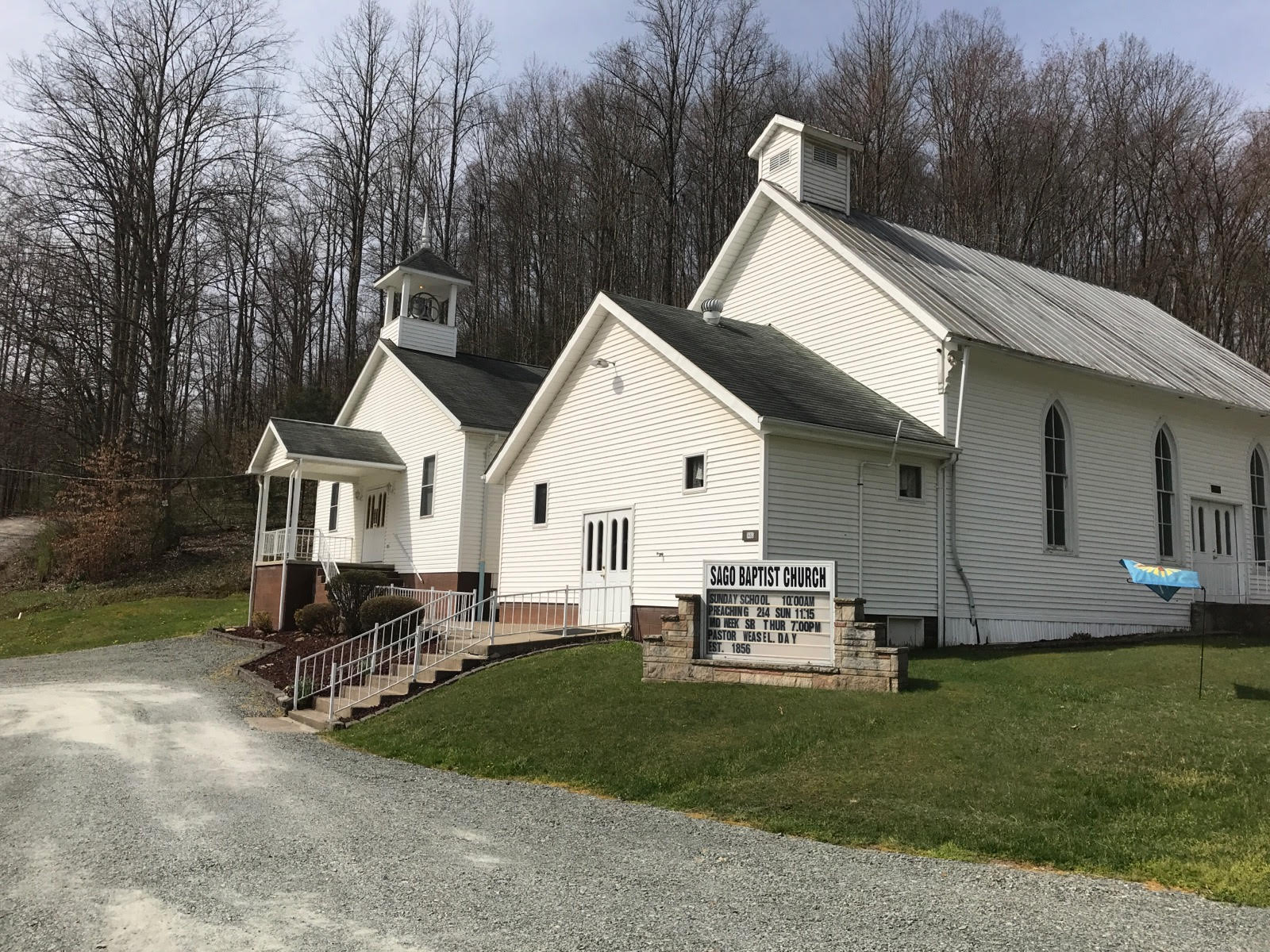
- Sago West Virginia Baptist church

- Location within the state of West Virginia Sago (the United States)
- Coordinates: 38°54′51″N 80°13′48″W
- Country: United States
- State: West Virginia
- County: Upshur
- Time zone: UTC-5 (Eastern (EST))
  - Summer (DST): UTC-4 (EDT)
- GNIS feature ID: 1555552

Sago /ˈseɪɡoʊ/ is an unincorporated community in Upshur County, West Virginia, United States. It is located along the Buckhannon River and is the site of the Sago Mine, scene of the 2006 Sago Mine disaster.

Also located in Sago is the Sago Baptist Church, shown repeatedly by the international media during the Sago Mine accident relief effort as it served as the site of family briefings and vigils.

The community was named by a cattleman for unknown reasons.

== Geography ==
Sago is located along the Buckhannon River in West Virginia. This river, characterized by its clarity and swift flow, is bordered by hills and adorned with hemlocks and rhododendrons, the latter being the state flower.

== History ==
=== Foundation ===
The area was first settled permanently in 1801 by Zedekiah Morgan, who traveled from Newtown, Connecticut, with his family. This marked the beginning of Sago's transformation from a wilderness to a settled community. Morgan was followed by other families such as the Morgans and Buntens, each contributing to the early growth and establishment of the community.

=== Economic development ===
The construction of the Baltimore and Ohio Railroad and its branch, the Coal and Coke Railroad, marked advancements in Sago's connectivity and economic integration with the broader region. These developments facilitated coal and timber operations, significantly impacting the local economy.

=== Industrial and social progress ===
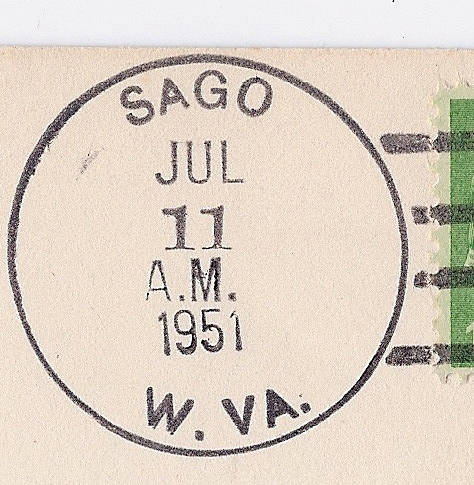
Sago postmark dated to 1951

Throughout the 19th and early 20th centuries, Sago continued to develop with the establishment of more advanced industrial operations like gristmills and wool carding machinery, alongside further railroad expansions. These developments supported the community's growth and integration into larger economic systems, setting the stage for continued prosperity and adaptability through changing times.

=== 21st century ===
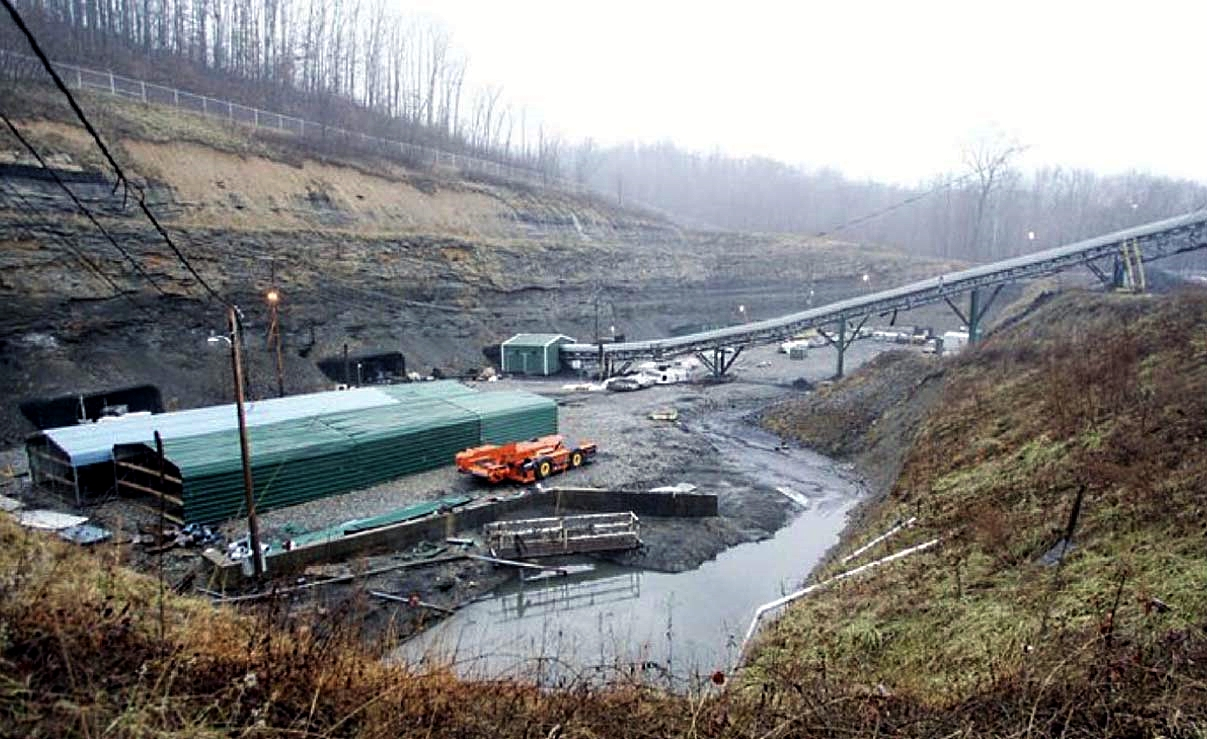
Sago Mine entrance

The Sago Mine disaster, which took place in January 2006, resulted in the deaths of 12 coal miners.

== Religion and education ==
Founded in the mid-19th century, the Sago Baptist Church was a cornerstone of community life and spiritual education. It played a role in the moral and social development of Sago. Alongside, the evolution of educational facilities, from subscription schools to free schools, marked progress in community development, with several individuals becoming prominent educators and contributing to the wider educational landscape.

== People ==
=== Morgan family ===
Zedekiah Morgan initiated the settlement near what is now the railroad bridge of the Coal and Coke. His sons, Joshua and Ezra Morgan, along with their families, expanded the settlement.

Members of the Morgan family were involved in the establishment of homes, farms, and the local Baptist church. Their descendants continued to influence the area, evidenced by engagements in various professions and community roles.

=== Bunten and Moore families ===
James Bunten, marrying into the Morgan family, brought industry to Sago by building mills for sawing lumber and grinding grain.

The Moore family, including through individuals like James Levin and Lorenzo Byron Moore, made contributions in military service during the Civil War and in civic roles thereafter, including educational and ministerial positions across different states.
