= Davitt McAteer =

American lawyer

J. Davitt McAteer is an American lawyer, author, and activist from Fairmont, West Virginia. McAteer was appointed to the position of assistant secretary for the Mine Safety and Health Administration from 1993 to 2000 under President Bill Clinton. Throughout his career, McAteer has been an advocate for safe working conditions for miners, particularly in the coal industry. After the Upper Big Branch Mine disaster of 2010, where an explosion caused by negligence led to the death of 29 miners, McAteer served on Governor Earl Ray Tomblin's independent investigation panel to determine the cause of the explosion. McAteer is the author of Monongah: The Tragic Story of the 1907 Monongah Mine Disaster.

== Career and research contributions ==
=== 1966 - 1970 ===
While in law school, McAteer conducted a study on the safety of West Virginia mines after the Farmington Mine disaster in November 1968. The findings of his study led to the first Mine Health and Safety Act in 1969. This Act led to the creation of MSHA and also provided compensation to miners completely disabled by black lung disease. The findings of the study were also published under the name "Coal Mine Health and Safety: The Case of West Virginia."

=== 1972 - 1983 ===
In 1972 McAteer greatly improved the United Mine Workers Association's health and safety programs by improving the training of safety investigators. In 1976 McAteer joined the Center for Law and Social Policy in Washington, D.C. where he played a major role in developing two mining laws: an expanded mine health and safety law as well as a federal law to control strip mining. He was a part of the Center for Law and Social Policy until 1983.

=== 1984 - 1993 ===
After leaving the Center for Law and Social Policy, McAteer went on to create the Occupational Safety and Health Law Center. The Occupational and Health Law Center was a law firm located in Shepherdstown, West Virginia and dealt with training and analysis of workplace health and safety issues.

=== 1994 - 2000 ===
McAteer served as the head of the Occupational Safety and Health Law Center until 1993 when he was appointed an Assistant Secretary in the Department of Labor, heading the Mine Health and Safety Administration (MSHA). During his term as the Assistant Secretary McAteer played a major role in the administration of the Federal Mine Safety and Health Act of 1977. Moreover, he focused on changing MSHA regulations regarding coal dust with the goal of eliminating black lung disease. Specifically, he implemented the review and improvement of a system where exposure to coal mine dust was calculated using the average of multiple samples. He also was the Solicitor for the Department of Labor in 1996 and 1997.

=== 2001 - present ===
In 2001 McAteer joined the Benefits Review Board of the U.S Department of Labor. The Benefits Review Board makes decisions in appeals of the administrative law judges under the Black Lung Benefits Act and the Longshore and Harbor Workers Compensation Act. In 2005 McAteer was named the Vice President for Special Programs at Wheeling Jesuit University, the university he graduated from in 1966. Mcateer was responsible for overseeing programs that receive federal funding. During his tenure as Vice President, McAteer also led the investigation into the Upper Big Branch, Sago, and Aracoma/Alma No. 1 mine disasters. The Upper Big Branch explosion was responsible for killing 29 coal mine workers; his report to the Governor of West Virginia concluded the explosion was caused by the neglect of safety regulations.

== Legacy ==
McAteer's publications include “Miner’s Manual: A Complete Guide to Health and Safety Protection on the Job,” which has sold more than 25,000 copies. McAteer has also directed and produced a documentary, Monongah 1907, and has written an in-depth historical examination and account of the same mining disaster. He is known for leading the investigation of the Upper Big Branch Mine Disaster, which occurred in 2010. McAteer has been a visiting lecturer at his alma mater West Virginia University School of Law.

== Publications ==
- Monongah: the Tragic Story of the 1907 Monongah Mine Disaster, the Worst Industrial Accident in US History. West Virginia University Press, 2007.
- Coal Mine Health and Safety; the Case of West Virginia. Praeger, 1973.
- Textile Health and Safety Manual: a Complete Guide to Health and Safety Protection on the Job. Occupational Safety and Health Law Center, 1986.
- How to Use Your Right to Know Chemical Hazards: a Guide to the New Hazard Communication Standards. Occupational Safety and Health Law Center, 1986.
