= Farmington Mine disaster =

1968 coal mine explosion in West Virginia, US

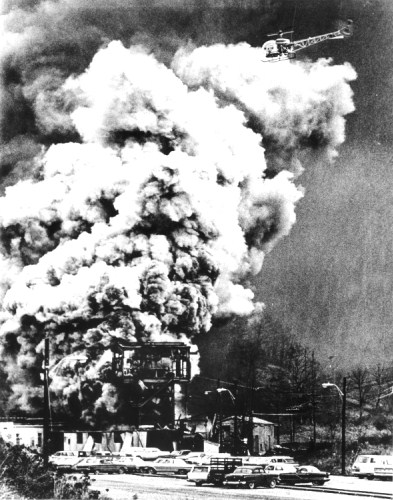
- Smoke and flames pouring from the Llewellyn shaft of the Consol No. 9 mine on November 20, 1968
- Date: November 20, 1968
- Time: 5:30 a.m.
- Location: Consol No. 9 coal mine north of Farmington and Mannington, West Virginia, United States; 39°32′19.0″N 80°15′14.4″W
- Cause: Coal Mine explosion
- Deaths: 78

The Farmington Mine disaster was an explosion that happened at approximately 5:30 a.m. on November 20, 1968, at the Consol No. 9 coal mine north of Farmington and Mannington, West Virginia, United States.

The explosion was large enough to be felt in Fairmont, almost 12 miles (19 km) away. At the time, 99 miners were inside. Over the course of the next few hours, 21 miners were able to escape the mine, but 78 were still trapped. All who were unable to escape perished; the bodies of 19 of the dead were never recovered. The cause of the explosion was never determined, but the accident served as the catalyst for several new laws that were enacted to protect miners.

The Farmington No. 9 Mine Memorial, bearing the names of the men who died, is located at the entrance of Flat Run Road in Mannington, West Virginia.

== Consol No. 9 ==
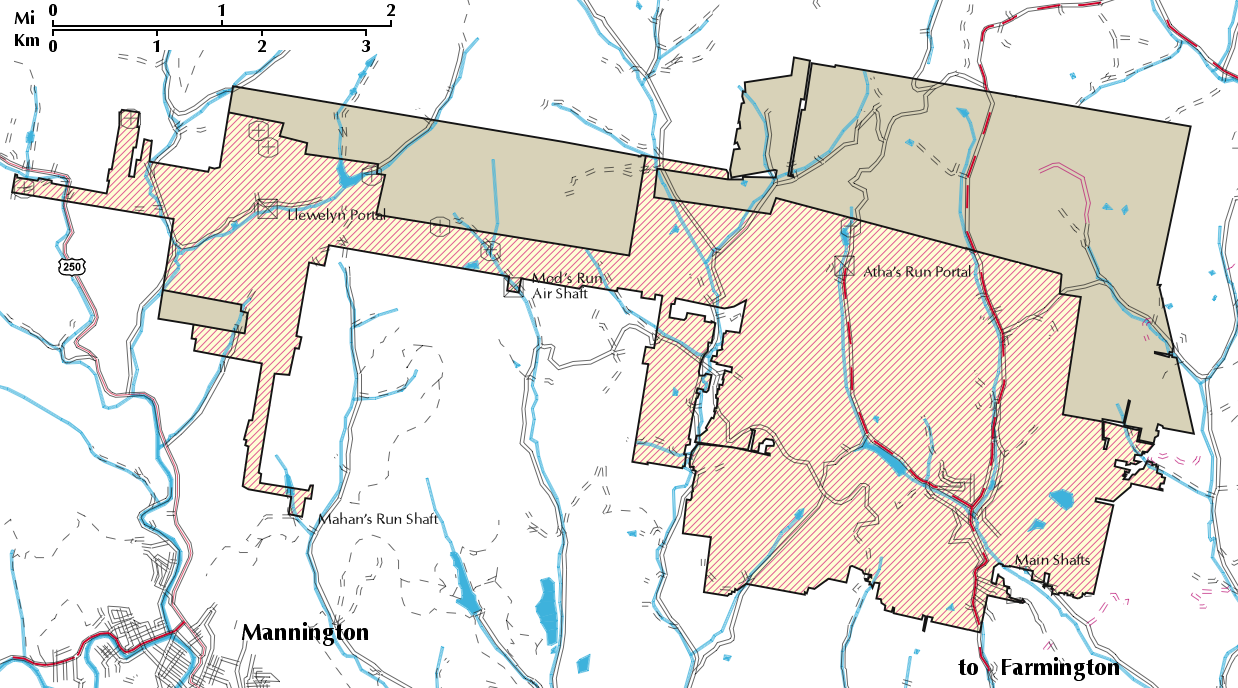
Map showing location and size of the Consol. No. 9 mine and its mine shafts. Pink areas were a room and pillar mine at the time of the disaster, while retreat mining had been completed in the brown areas.

An oral history of the Farmington Mine disaster

The Consol No. 9 mine was developed in the Pittsburgh coal seam, with its main entrances at James Fork, the confluence of Little Dunkard Mill Run and Dunkard Mill Run, 2 miles (3.2 kilometers) north of Farmington, West Virginia (39°32′19.09″N 80°15′14.44″W). The Pittsburgh seam is over 300 feet (91 meters) below the valley bottoms in this region, and is fairly uniform, generally about 10 feet (3.0 meters) thick.

This mine was originally opened in 1909 as the Jamison No. 9 Mine, operated by the Jamison Coal and Coke Company. The original entrance shafts were 322 feet (98 m) deep. Even in 1909, it was noted that "gasses are liberating" from the coal in the mine, so that locked safety lamps were used at all times. Initially, compressed air power was used to undercut the coal, which was then blasted before horse power was used to haul the coal to the shaft, but within a year, compressed air locomotives were obtained for the mine railway.

Between 1911 and 1929, Jamison No. 9 produced over 100,000 short tons (91,000 t) per year, except in 1922, when production was just under 3,000 short tons (2,700 t). Production fell to just over 4,000 short tons (3,600 t) in early 1930, after which the mine was closed for three years. Production resumed in 1934, climbing to over 1,200,000 short tons (1,100,000 t) per year in 1956.

On November 13, 1954, an explosion ripped through the mine, killing 16 miners and leading to a temporary shutdown. In addition to 16 deaths, the explosion destroyed the headframe of one mine shaft. The explosion occurred during pillar removal conducted as part of retreat mining.

Under Consolidation Coal Company ownership, coal production in 1977 was 98,772 tons. This coal was produced as a byproduct of the recovery operation after the 1968 explosion.

== Chronology ==
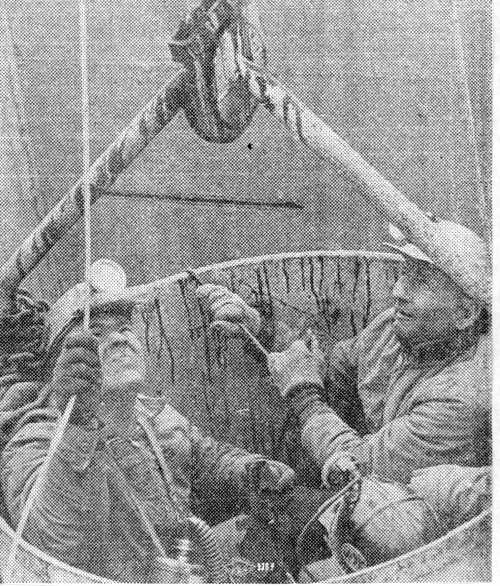
Three of the miners being rescued via a hoist bucket on November 20

At 5:30 a.m on November 20, 1968, an explosion shook the mine. It was so strong that a motel clerk reported feeling vibrations 12 miles (19 km) away. Miners living in the area heard the noise and, knowing what it meant, headed to the mine, where they discovered a rapidly spreading fire with flames shooting 150 feet (46 m) into the air. Within hours, 21 miners made it to the surface but 78 were still trapped underground.

The fires continued to burn for over a week, and on November 29, rescuers finally admitted defeat after air samples from drill holes showed air unable to sustain human life. The mine was sealed on November 30 with concrete to starve the fire of oxygen.

In September 1969, the mine was unsealed in an attempt to recover the miners' bodies. Progress was slow because workers discovered cave-ins that they had to tunnel around. This recovery effort continued for almost ten years. By April 1978, 59 of the 78 bodies had been recovered.

== Victims ==
The 1968 explosion killed 78 miners. Those marked with an asterisk [*] indicates their body was not recovered.

- Arthur A. Anderson Jr.
- Jack O. Armstrong [*]
- Thomas D. Ashcraft
- Jimmy Barr
- Orval D. Beam [*]
- John Joseph Bingamon [*]
- Thomas Boggess
- Louis S. Boros [*]
- Harold W. Butt
- Lee E. Carpenter
- David V. Cartwright
- William E. Currence [*]
- Dale E. Davis
- Albert R. DeBerry
- George O. Decker
- Howard A. Deel [*]
- James E. Efaw
- Joe Ferris
- Virgil A. Forte [*]
- H. Wade Foster [*]
- Audla G. Freeman Jr. [*]
- Robert L. Glover
- Forrest B. Goff
- John F. Gouzd
- Charles F. Hardman
- Ebert E. Hartzell
- Simon P. Hayes
- Roy F. Henderson
- Paul F. Henderson Jr. [*]
- Steve Horvath
- Junior M Jenkins [*]
- James Jones
- Pete J. Kaznoski Sr. [*]
- Robert D. Kerns
- Charles E. King
- James R. Kniceley
- George R. Kovar
- David Mainella
- Walter R. Martin
- Frank Matish [*]
- Hartsel L. Mayle
- Dennis N. McDonald
- Emilio D. Megna [*]
- Jack D. Michael [*]
- Wayne R. Minor
- Charles E. Moody
- Paul O. Moran
- Adron W. Morris
- Joseph Muto
- Randall Ray Parsons
- Raymond R. Parsons
- Nicholas Petro
- Fred B. Rogers
- William D. Sheme
- Robert J. Sigley
- Henry J. Skarsinski
- Russell D. Snyder
- John Sopuch [*]
- Jerry L. Stoneking
- Harry L. Strait
- Albert Takacs
- William L. Takacs [*]
- Dewey Tarley
- Frank Tate Jr.
- Goy A. Taylor
- Hoy B. Taylor
- Edwin A Tennant [*]
- Homer E. Tichenor
- Dennis L. Toler
- John W. Toothman
- Gorman H. Trimble
- Roscoe M. Triplett
- William T. Walker
- James Henry Walter
- Lester B. Willard
- Edward A. Williams [*]
- Lloyd W. Wilson
- Jerry R. Yanero

== Resulting governmental legislation ==
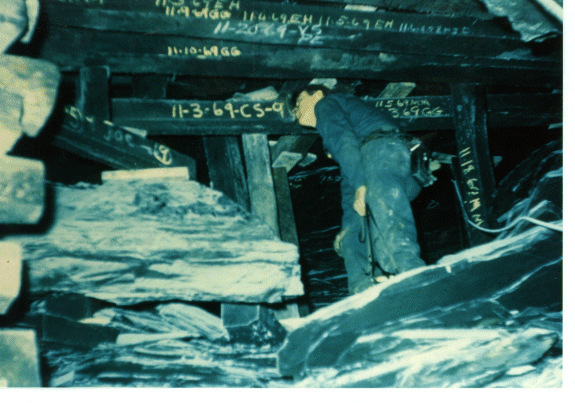
Investigation and recovery operations following the re-opening of the mine shafts

The Farmington disaster was a catalyst for the passage of major changes in U.S. mining safety law. One month after the disaster the U.S. Department of the Interior held a conference on mine safety. Stewart Udall's opening speech specifically referenced Farmington and concluded, "let me assure you, the people of this country no longer will accept the disgraceful health and safety record that has characterized this major industry."

As a result of the Farmington disaster, the United States Congress passed the 1969 Coal Mine Safety and Health Act which strengthened safety standards, increased Federal mine inspections, created the Mine Safety and Health Administration, and gave coal miners specific safety and health rights. In November 1968 Davitt McAteer conducted a study of West Virginia mines after the Farmington disaster.

== Investigation ==
In 1990, the federal Mine Safety and Health Administration investigation into the accident concluded in part that the ventilation in the mine "was inadequate overall, and most probably non-existent in some areas."

In 2008, a memo written by an investigator in September 1970 came to light. In it, the inspector wrote that a safety alarm on a ventilation fan used to flush explosive methane gas from the mine had been disabled. "Therefore when the fan would stop there was no way of anyone knowing about it because the alarm signal was bypassed," the inspector wrote. This was confirmed when in 2015, retired mine inspector Larry Layne testified in a sworn affidavit that he had been told by mine electricians in 1970 that they had intentionally disabled the alarm on a ventilation fan the previous year.

== Litigation ==
Families of the miners who died in the blast were never compensated for their deaths. A lawsuit filed in Marion County Circuit Court on November 6, 2014, on behalf of the estates of dead miners, alleged that plaintiffs discovered in June that the mine's chief electrician, Alex Kovarbasich, disabled a ventilation fan that contributed to the accident. The lawsuit further alleges that the mining company, Consolidation Coal Co., has concealed the identity of the manager since the accident. After being transferred to federal district court due to diversity of plaintiffs' jurisdiction, the case was initially dismissed due to the statute of limitations around wrongful death suits in West Virginia. The suit was subsequently referred to the Supreme Court of Appeals of West Virginia by the United States Court of Appeals for the Fourth Circuit due to a lack of precedent. The court determined that the statute of repose is an essential element of a wrongful death claim, and had since passed. In 2017, families of the miners challenged the court's decision on the statute of repose by arguing that the knowledge of disabled ventilation was not present until recent years. This reopening of the case stated that the statute of repose claim was irrelevant to the case because the information used as the basis for the lawsuit was acquired only three years before. The Circuit Court sent the case back to the West Virginia Supreme Court for determining questions on the basis of West Virginia law. The case has since been dismissed from the court's system.

== Legacy ==
Alongside the resulting government legislation, the disaster has been remembered yearly in an annual ceremony commemorating the miners and pushing for continued mine safety. The ceremony takes place on the Sunday in November that falls closest to November 20, the anniversary of the explosion. The United Mine Workers of America host the ceremony. It includes placing of wreaths on behalf of the deceased miners as well as speakers from the United Mine Workers Organization. Alongside this ceremonial remembrance, the event urges attendees to push for legislation protecting miner safety. The gathering is attended by many family members, descendants, and prominent West Virginian politicians, such as United States Senator Joe Manchin, who grew up living minutes away from the mine and lost an uncle in the explosion. The ceremony is held at a memorial built in Mannington, West Virginia, directly over the spot where the #9 mine lay underneath. The monument is a large carved stone; etched into the front are the names of the 78 miners who lost their lives in the explosion. The memorial is surrounded by a fence and stream and is open to visitors year-round.
