= Federal Mines Safety Act of 1910 =

United States Federal Statute

- Long title: An Act to establish in the Department of the Interior a Bureau of Mines.
- Nicknames: Federal Mines Accident Prevention and Safety Act of 1910
- Enacted by: the 61st United States Congress
- Effective: July 1, 1910

Citations
- Public law: Pub. L. 61–179
- Statutes at Large: 36 Stat. 369-b, Chap. 240

Codification
- Titles amended: 30 U.S.C.: Mineral Lands and Mining
- U.S.C. sections created: 30 U.S.C. ch. 1 § 1 et seq.

Legislative history
- Introduced in the House as H.R. 13915; Signed into law by President William Howard Taft on May 16, 1910

Federal Mines Safety Act of 1910 was a United States statute passed for the purposes of establishing the United States Bureau of Mines as a federal agency of the United States Department of the Interior. The Act of Congress authorized investigations of mining methods with an emphasis regarding the safety of miners while recovering combustible fossil fuels and confronting occupational dust exposure.

In 1897, the United States Geological Survey created a mining geology program providing geological studies of mining districts (e.g., Comstock Lode and Leadville mining district) and examinations relevant to efficient mining extraction technologies of fossil fuel and precious metal materials. The 1910 public law commissioned the United States Bureau of Mines to conduct future investigations of mining accidents exempting the United States Geological Survey.

The H.R. 13915 bill was passed by the 61st United States Congressional session and enacted into law by the President William Howard Taft on May 16, 1910.

== Mining Accidents and Federal Regulation Law ==
The 1910 United States federal law was created as a result of mining disasters where significant human resources perished in underground mining accidents.

| 1900 Scofield Mine disaster | 1907 Darr Mine disaster |
| 1902 Fraterville Mine disaster | 1909 Cherry Mine disaster |
| 1903 Hanna Mine disaster | 1911 Banner Mine disaster |
| 1904 Harwick Mine disaster | 1911 Cross Mountain Mine disaster |
| 1907 Monongah mining disaster |

== Federal Experimental Coal Mine Stations ==
On December 22, 1913, the 63rd United States Congress passed a public law authorizing the United States Treasury to contract the design and development of a Bureau of Mines experimental station within the vicinity of Pittsburgh, Pennsylvania.

| Date of Enactment | Public Law Number | U.S. Statute Citation | U.S. Legislative Bill | U.S. Presidential Administration |
|---|---|---|---|---|
| March 4, 1931 | P.L. 71-842 | 46 Stat. 1518 | S. 5220 | Herbert C. Hoover |
| February 25, 1938 | P.L. 75-436 | 52 Stat. 82 | S. 628 | Franklin D. Roosevelt |

== See also ==
| Bituminous coal | Mine safety |
| Coal dust | Mining accident |
| Coalbed methane | Safety lamp |
| Coalworker's pneumoconiosis | Underground mine ventilation |
| Firedamp | Underground mining (hard rock) |
| Lignite | Underground mining (soft rock) |

Safety Pioneers of Geologic Mining Industry

| Joseph Austin Holmes | George Otis Smith |
| Clarence King | Walter O. Snelling |

United States Legislation & Mining Industry

| General Mining Act of 1872 | Federal Coal Mine Health and Safety Act of 1969 |
| Mineral Leasing Act of 1920 | Black Lung Benefits Act of 1972 |
| Federal Coal Mine Safety Act of 1952 | Federal Mine Safety and Health Act of 1977 |

== Open Flame Illumination & Underground Mining ==
"Mining Lights and Hats". National Museum of American History. Smithsonian Institution.
"Oil-Wick Cap Lamps". National Museum of American History. Smithsonian Institution.
"Carbide Lamps". National Museum of American History. Smithsonian Institution.
