= Federal Coal Mine Safety Act of 1952 =

US law

- Long title: An Act to amend Public Law 49, Seventy-seventh Congress, so as to provide for the prevention of major disasters in coal mines.
- Nicknames: Federal Coal Mine Safety Act Amendment of 1952
- Enacted by: the 82nd United States Congress
- Effective: July 16, 1952

Citations
- Public law: Pub. L. 82–552
- Statutes at Large: 66 Stat. 692, Chap. 877

Codification
- Titles amended: 30 U.S.C.: Mineral Lands and Mining
- U.S.C. sections amended: 30 U.S.C. ch. 22 § 801 et seq.

Legislative history
- Introduced in the Senate as S. 1310 by Leverett Saltonstall (R–MA) on February 27, 1952; Committee consideration by Senate Labor and Public Welfare, House Education and Labor; Passed the Senate on May 7, 1952 (Passed); Passed the House on July 2, 1952 (Passed); Agreed to by the Senate on July 2, 1952 (Passed); Signed into law by President Harry S. Truman on July 16, 1952

The Federal Coal Mine Safety Act of 1952 is a U.S. law authorizing the federal government to conduct annual inspections of underground coal mines with more than 15 workers, and gave the United States Bureau of Mines the authority to shut down a mine in cases of "imminent danger." The Act authorized the assessment of civil penalties against mine operators for failing to comply with an order to shut down (a "withdrawal order") or for refusing to give inspectors access to mine property. The law did not authorize monetary penalties for noncompliance with the safety provisions. In 1966, Congress extended coverage to all underground coal mines.

The Act made ventilation mandatory in mines so as to limit the levels of methane in the air. It also required mine walls to be "dusted" with a limestone to limit the levels of coal dust.

== History ==
Passage of the law responded to a 1951 mine explosion which killed 111 miners in Illinois. President Truman signed the law on July 16, 1952.

Most regulation of mines was left to the U.S. states, and the Bureau of Mines or MSHA would get involved if either there were a disaster or a state agency request. Legislators apparently said that the federal 1952 law was oriented toward addressing the infrequent disasters in which five or more miners died, not preventing more common causes of deaths in mines.

== See also ==
- Federal Mines Safety Act of 1910
- Federal Coal Mine Health and Safety Act of 1969
- Title 30 of the Code of Federal Regulations
