= Preventing Government Waste and Protecting Coal Mining Jobs in America =

- Long title: To amend the Surface Mining Control and Reclamation Act of 1977 to stop the ongoing waste by the Department of the Interior of taxpayer resources and implement the final rule on excess spoil, mining waste, and buffers for perennial and intermittent streams, and for other purposes.
- Announced in: the 113th United States Congress
- Sponsored by: Rep. Bill Johnson (R, OH-6)
- Number of co-sponsors: 1

Codification
- Acts affected: Surface Mining Control and Reclamation Act of 1977
- U.S.C. sections affected: 30 U.S.C. § 1253
- Agencies affected: United States Department of the Interior, Office of Surface Mining

Legislative history
- Introduced in the House as H.R. 2824 by Rep. Bill Johnson (R, OH-6) on July 25, 2013; Committee consideration by United States House Committee on Natural Resources, United States House Natural Resources Subcommittee on Energy and Mineral Resources; Passed the House on March 25, 2014 (229-192)

The Preventing Government Waste and Protecting Coal Mining Jobs in America (H.R. 2824) is a bill that would amend the Surface Mining Control and Reclamation Act of 1977 to require state programs for regulation of surface coal mining to incorporate the necessary rule concerning excess spoil, coal mine waste, and buffers for perennial and intermittent streams published by the Office of Surface Mining Reclamation and Enforcement on December 12, 2008.

The bill was introduced into the United States House of Representatives during the 113th United States Congress. It passed the House but never reached a vote in the Senate and was not enacted.

== Provisions of the bill ==
This summary is based largely on the summary provided by the Congressional Research Service, a public domain source.

The Preventing Government Waste and Protecting Coal Mining Jobs in America would amend the Surface Mining Control and Reclamation Act of 1977 to require state programs for regulation of surface coal mining to incorporate the necessary rule concerning excess spoil, coal mine waste, and buffers for perennial and intermittent streams published by the Office of Surface Mining Reclamation and Enforcement on December 12, 2008.

The bill would require the Secretary of the Interior to: (1) publish notice of a determination when all states that wish to assume exclusive jurisdiction of such mining regulation have incorporated the rule in their programs; (2) assess the effectiveness of the rule's implementation during the five-year period following such notice; and (3) report to Congress an evaluation of the rule's effectiveness, any ways in which it inhibits energy production, and any proposed changes to the rule.

The bill would prohibit issuance of any regulations regarding stream buffer zones or protection before publication of the report, other than a rule necessary to implement incorporation of the December 2008 rule described in this Act. Requires each state with an approved program for regulation of surface coal mining to submit program amendments incorporating such rule within two years of enactment of this Act.

== Congressional Budget Office report ==
This summary is based largely on the summary provided by the Congressional Budget Office, as ordered reported by the House Committee on Natural Resources on November 14, 2013. This is a public domain source.

H.R. 2824 would require certain states to implement, within two years, a rule published in 2008 by the Office of Surface Mining, Reclamation, and Enforcement (OSM) regarding the disposal of mine waste near streams (the stream buffer zone rule). The bill also would require OSM to assess the effectiveness of that rule after five years of implementation and to report its findings to the Congress. Finally, the bill would prevent OSM from issuing a new rule regarding stream buffer zones until the agency completes the report required under the bill.

The Congressional Budget Office (CBO) estimates that implementing the bill would have no significant impact on the federal budget. Enacting the bill could affect offsetting receipts, which are treated as reductions in direct spending; therefore, pay-as-you-go procedures apply. However, CBO estimates that any such effects would be negligible. Enacting H.R. 2824 would not affect revenues.

Under the 2008 stream buffer zone rule, which CBO expects would be implemented through 2021 under the bill, firms would be allowed to dispose of mine waste near streams if regulators determine that avoiding disturbance of the streams is not reasonably possible. Under the rule OSM is currently implementing, firms are prohibited from disposing of mine waste within 100 feet of streams; however, according to the Office of Information and Regulatory Affairs, OSM is in the process of preparing a new rule to govern such disposal. CBO has no information regarding the content of the new rule or when it might be implemented.

The budgetary impact of enacting H.R. 2824 would depend, in part, on whether the stream buffer zone rule implemented under the bill would be more or less restrictive than the rule implemented under current law. If the rule implemented under the bill imposed relatively fewer restrictions on the disposal of mine waste, coal producers would use less costly methods to dispose of such waste and CBO expects that firms producing coal would increase their valuation of coal leases affected by the rule, including leases on federal lands. Under such a rule, CBO expects that proceeds to the federal government would increase from the sale of federal coal leases. Conversely, a relatively more restrictive disposal rule would reduce the value of coal leases and thus the proceeds from the sale of coal leases on federal lands.

Based on information provided by OSM, CBO expects that implementing a new stream buffer zone rule would primarily affect coal mining that requires the removal of mountaintops in the Appalachian Mountains. In 2012, the federal proceeds from activities related to coal mining on federal lands in that area totaled $1.5 million. Because the existing federal proceeds from the area affected by this bill are small, and because it is unclear whether the rule imposed by this bill would be more or less restrictive than the rule that OSM will impose under current law, CBO expects that firms in the coal industry would not significantly change their valuation of coal leases under the bill, and therefore, that enacting H.R. 2824 would have a negligible impact on the federal budget.

H.R. 2824 contains no intergovernmental or private-sector mandates as defined in the Unfunded Mandates Reform Act (UMRA). The bill would impose additional requirements on states and tribal governments that choose to apply for exclusive jurisdiction—or "primacy"—in regulating surface mining operations within their jurisdiction. However, those requirements would be conditions of participating in a voluntary federal program and thus not mandates as defined in UMRA.

== Procedural history ==
The Preventing Government Waste and Protecting Coal Mining Jobs in America was introduced into the United States House of Representatives on July 25, 2013 by Rep. Bill Johnson (R, OH-6). It was referred to the United States House Committee on Natural Resources and the United States House Natural Resources Subcommittee on Energy and Mineral Resources. On February 28, 2014, the committee reported the bill alongside House Report 113-364. On February 29, 2014, House Majority Leader Eric Cantor announced that H.R. 2824 would be considered on March 4, 2014. However, due to a snowstorm, consideration of the bill was delayed until March 25, 2014, another day on which it snowed. The bill passed the House with a vote of 229-192 and was read in the Senate on May 7, 2014 after which it was placed on the Senate Legislative Calendar but never received a vote and was not enacted.

== Debate and discussion ==
Majority Leader Eric Cantor described the bill as needed to stop "excessive and unnecessary" regulation. Rep. Bill Johnson indicated that the bill was in response to changes in coal mining rules proposed by the Obama Administration.

Supporters of the bill argue that it will be good for jobs, save the government money, and improve U.S. energy production by preventing the Obama Administration from introducing more coal regulations. The bill is a reaction to actions taken by the Obama Administration to rewrite a regulation called the 2008 Stream Buffer Zone Rule. According to one source, "the Administration has spent nearly $9 million taxpayer dollars working to rewrite this rule, including hiring new contractors, who were dismissed once it was publicly revealed that the Administration's proposed regulation could cost 7,000 jobs and cause economic harm in 22 states."

The National Mining Association supported the bill, with its President, Al Quinn, saying "this bill accomplishes the important task sometimes lacking in public policy: it balances the needs of the economy with the needs of the environment." The Small Business & Entrepreneurship Council (SBEC) also supported the bill. According to the SBEC's President, Karen Kerrigan, "impractical and excessive regulations are certainly hurting the coal industry, and by extension the many small businesses who need affordable electricity to remain competitive."

Opponents of the bill described it as a bill that would require "OSM to implement the flawed 2008 Stream Buffer Zone rule and prevent the agency from improving that rule for a minimum of seven years." Opponents also claimed that Republicans were using "fear mongering" to argue in favor of the bill. Rep. Jared Huffman (D-CA) opposed the bill, arguing that it should be opposed because the supporters "believe coal companies should be allowed to blow the tops off mountains and dump the waste into streams, no matter what the science says about the consequence for our environment and the public health."

== See also ==
- List of bills in the 113th United States Congress
- Environmental impact of mining
