= Coalie =

Mascot for the U.S. Office of Surface Mining Reclamation and Enforcement

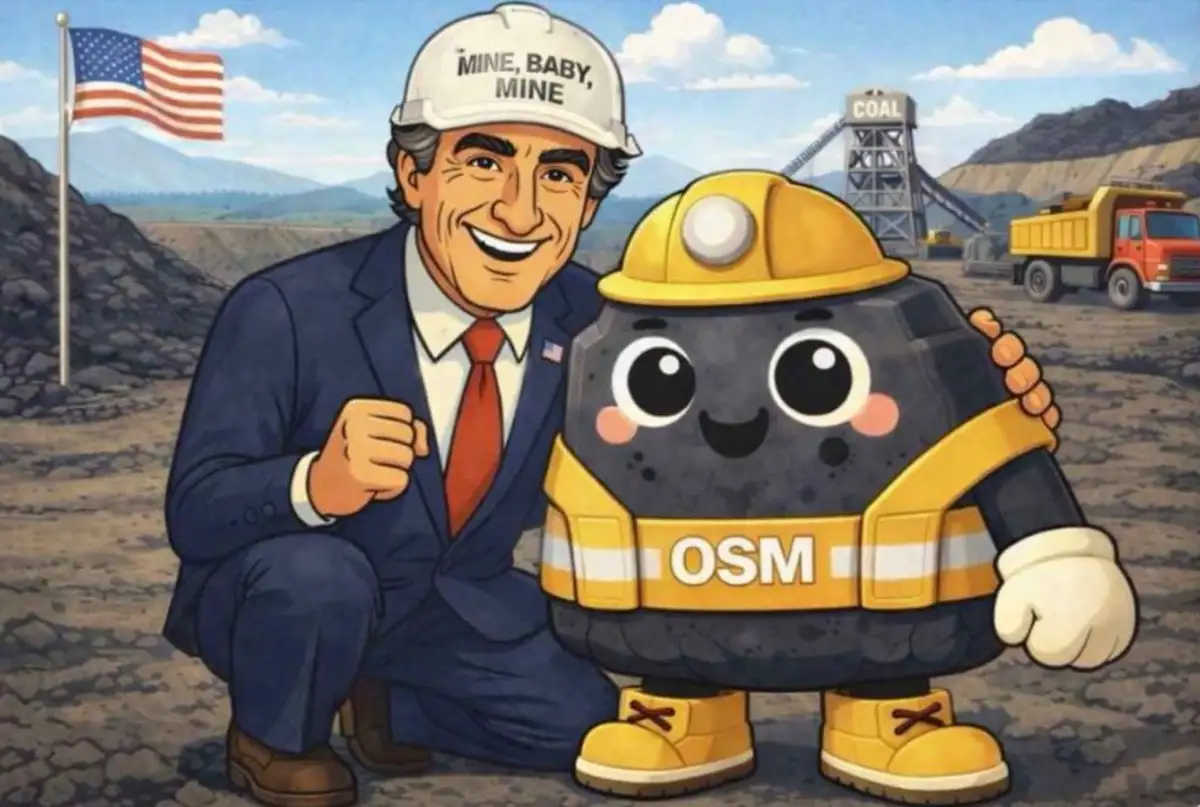
- An AI-generated image of Coalie posted by Doug Burgum
- First appearance: 2026-01-26
- Created by: Sara Eckert (original concept); OSMRE in-house staff (2026 update)

In-universe information
- Species: Anthropomorphic coal
- Gender: Male

Coalie is the official mascot for the Office of Surface Mining Reclamation and Enforcement (OSMRE), a bureau within the United States Department of the Interior. Introduced in January 2026 during the second presidency of Donald Trump, the character is designed as an anthropomorphic lump of coal intended to promote the administration's "American Energy Dominance Agenda" and educate the public on coal mining regulation and land reclamation.

== History ==
The character originated in 2018 as an internal office joke within the OSMRE. Sara Eckert, the agency's social media manager at the time, placed googly eyes on a piece of coal to create an unofficial mascot for the bureau's digital channels. The character evolved through various iterations shared on internal platforms such as Microsoft Teams, eventually gaining accessories such as a hard hat and boots.

Coalie was formally introduced to the public on January 21, 2026. The announcement gained significant national attention on January 22, when Secretary of the Interior Doug Burgum posted an image on social media featuring a cartoon version of himself alongside the mascot. In the post, Burgum described Coalie as a tool to help "unleash beautiful, clean coal" and act as a guide for the administration's energy policies.

== Characteristics and design ==
Coalie is depicted as a black, textured lump of coal with large, "kawaii-style" eyes, pink cheeks, and wide grin. He typically wears yellow mining boots, gloves, and a white hard hat. Journalists and graphic designers have noted that the 2026 imagery of Coalie appears to be generated using artificial intelligence, citing inconsistencies in the number of stripes on American flags and other "uncanny" visual artifacts in official promotional materials.

The OSMRE has defined Coalie's personality as "wise, curious, and collaborative," citing influences such as Smokey Bear and characters from Schoolhouse Rock!.

== Reception ==
The mascot's introduction was met with immediate criticism from environmental groups and climate activists. Junior Walk, an activist with Coal River Mountain Watch, described the use of a cute mascot for the coal industry as "sick" and "criminally negligent," given the environmental and health impacts of coal mining. Critics also highlighted the timing of the mascot's launch, which coincided with the signing of a law redirecting $500 million which had been previously earmarked for abandoned mine reclamation to the United States Forest Service for wildfire management instead. Chelsea Barnes of Appalachian Voices characterized the mascot as a "middle finger" to coal communities concerned with health and safety.

In response to the criticism, OSMRE spokespeople defended Coalie as an "educational tool" designed to simplify complex regulatory jargon and raise awareness of the agency's land restoration projects.

== See also ==
- Domestic policy of the second Trump administration
- Smokey Bear
