= Bill Johnson (university president) =

American university administrator (born 1954)

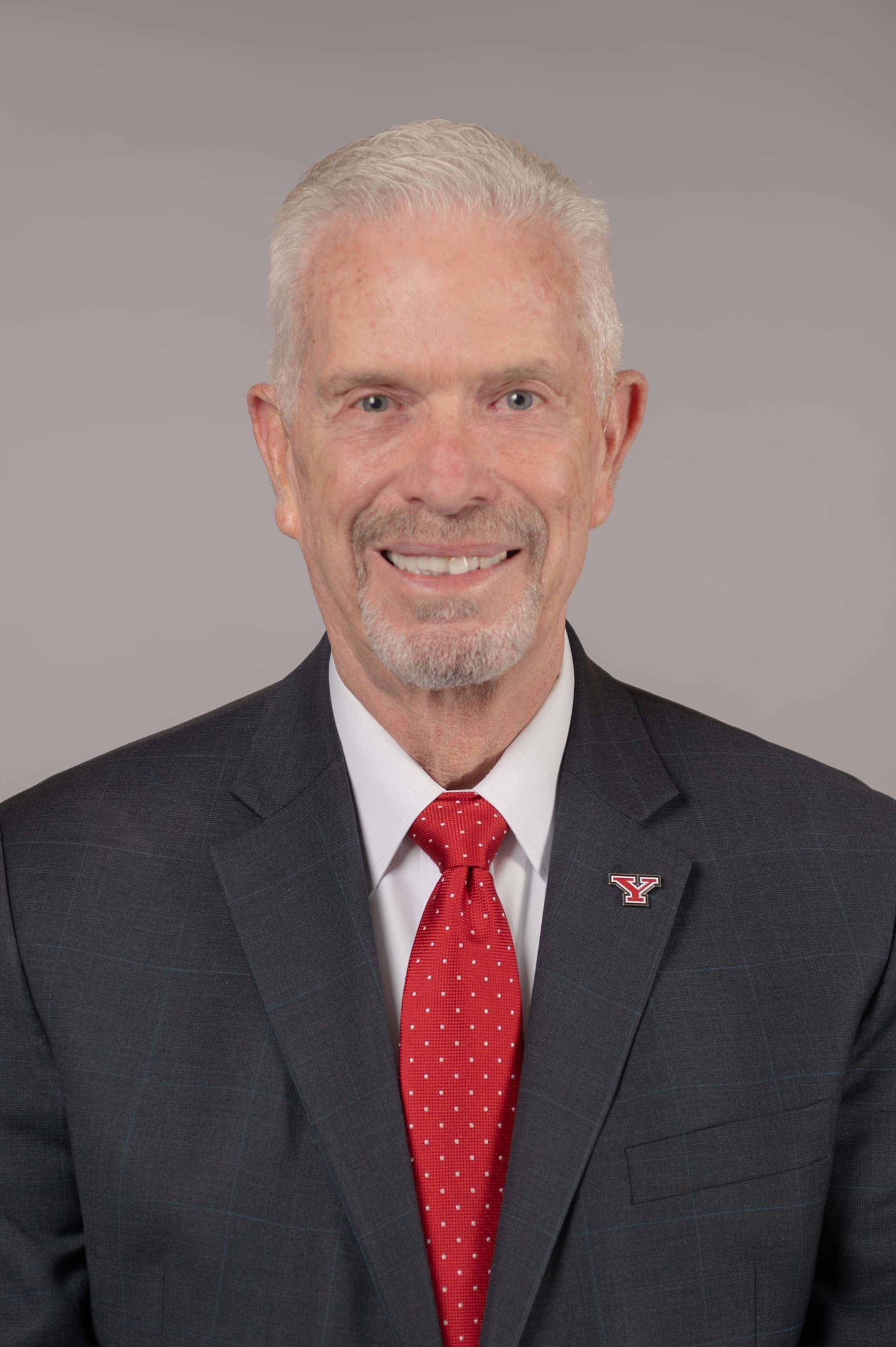

10th President of Youngstown State University
- Incumbent
- Assumed office January 22, 2024
- Preceded by: Jim Tressel

Member of the U.S. House of Representatives from Ohio's 6th district
- In office January 3, 2011 – January 21, 2024
- Preceded by: Charlie Wilson
- Succeeded by: Michael Rulli

Personal details
- Born: William Leslie Johnson; November 10, 1954 (age 71) Roseboro, North Carolina, U.S.
- Party: Republican
- Spouse(s): Wanda Porter (divorced) LeeAnn Johnson
- Children: 4
- Education: Troy University (BS); Georgia Institute of Technology (MS)

Military service
- Branch/service: United States Air Force
- Years of service: 1973–1999
- Rank: Lieutenant Colonel
- Awards: Meritorious Service Medal; Air Force Commendation Medal; National Defense Service Medal

William Leslie Johnson (born November 10, 1954) is an American university administrator, businessman, and former politician who has served as the tenth president of Youngstown State University since 2024. A member of the Republican Party, he was the U.S. representative for Ohio's 6th congressional district from 2011 to 2024.

Born in Roseboro, North Carolina, Johnson entered the United States Air Force after graduating from high school in 1973. For his time in the military, he received numerous awards and distinctions, including the Meritorious Service Medal. Following his retirement in 1999 at the rank of lieutenant colonel, Johnson co-founded Johnson-Schley Management Group, an information technology consulting company, before leaving to form J2 Business Solutions, where he was a defense contractor to the U.S. military.

In the 2010 United States House of Representatives elections, Johnson defeated incumbent U.S. representative Charlie Wilson by a margin of 5%. He was reelected to the position six times. In November 2023, the Board of Trustees at Youngstown State University offered him the position of president. Johnson accepted and resigned from Congress in January 2024 to become the 10th president of the university.

== Early life and business career ==
William Leslie Johnson was born on November 10, 1954, in Roseboro, North Carolina. After graduating from S.D. Lee High School in Columbus, Mississippi, he entered the United States Air Force in 1973. Johnson graduated summa cum laude from Troy University in 1979 and from Georgia Tech in 1984 with a master's degree. During his tenure in the U.S. Air Force, Johnson was recognized as a Distinguished Graduate from the Air Force Reserve Officer Training Corps, Squadron Officers School, and Air Command & Staff College. He retired as a Lieutenant Colonel after a military career of more than 26 years.

After his service in the military, he co-founded Johnson-Schley Management Group, an information technology (IT) consulting company that increased revenues by more than 200% in three years under his leadership. In 2003, he left the company to form J2 Business Solutions, where he provided executive-level IT support as a defense contractor to the U.S. military. From 2006 to 2010, he served as chief information officer of a global manufacturer of electronic components for the transportation industry.

== Personal life ==
On April 30, 1975, he married Wanda Florence Porter. They had three children together. Johnson is Protestant. While Johnson and Porter got divorced, he got remarried to his current wife, LeeAnn Johnson. They have a son, Nathan, together.

== U.S. House of Representatives ==
=== Elections ===
2010

In May 2010, Johnson defeated two primary opponents to win the Republican nomination. In the general election, he defeated incumbent Charlie Wilson, 50%–45%. He began his term in the 112th United States Congress on January 3, 2011.

2012

In November 2011, Wilson filed for a rematch in the newly redrawn 6th District, which had been made slightly friendlier to Republicans in redistricting. Johnson defeated Wilson again in a heavily contested race, 53% to 47%, and began his second term in January 2013.

2014

In 2014, Johnson faced Democratic nominee Jennifer Garrison, a former State Representative and lawyer from Marietta, Ohio. Johnson defeated Garrison, 58% to 39%, with Green Party candidate Dennis Lambert taking 3%. He began his third term in January 2015.

2016

Johnson was reelected to a fourth term in the 2016 general election, defeating Democrat Michael Lorentz, the mayor of Belpre, Ohio, 71%–29%.

2018

Johnson was reelected to a fifth term, defeating Democrat Shawna Roberts, of Barnesville, Ohio, 69%–30%.

=== Key moments ===
The House passed Johnson's World War II Memorial Prayer Act, which would require the prayer President Franklin Roosevelt gave on D-Day to be placed on the World War II memorial.

The House also passed Johnson's Stop the War on Coal Act, which would stop the creation of any new rules that threaten mining jobs. Both pieces of legislation have been sent to the Senate for consideration. Johnson sponsored H.R. 4036, the Pass a Budget Now Act, which would cut legislators' pay if a budget is not passed by April 15 of each year.

On January 7, 2021, Johnson objected to the certification of the 2020 U.S. presidential election results in Congress.

=== Committee assignments ===
- Committee on Energy and Commerce
  - Subcommittee on Commerce, Manufacturing, and Trade
  - Subcommittee on Environment and Economy
  - Subcommittee on Oversight and Investigations
- Committee on Science, Space and Technology
  - Subcommittee on Space

=== Caucus memberships ===
- Congressional Arts Caucus
- Congressional Western Caucus
- Republican Study Committee
- Republican Main Street Partnership
- Problem Solvers Caucus
- Congressional Caucus on Turkey and Turkish Americans
- Congressional Taiwan Caucus

== Legislation sponsored ==
Johnson sponsored and supported several pieces of federal legislation during his tenure in the U.S. House of Representatives.

=== Veterans Health Care Facilities Capital Improvement Act ===
In 2011, Johnson sponsored the Veterans Health Care Facilities Capital Improvement Act of 2011 (H.R. 2646), which authorized funding for major construction and renovation projects at Department of Veterans Affairs medical facilities to address infrastructure deficiencies and expand capacity. The bill passed both chambers of Congress and was signed into law as Public Law 112-37 on October 5, 2011, by President Barack Obama.

=== Community Fire Safety Act ===
Johnson introduced the Community Fire Safety Act of 2013 (H.R. 3588; 113th Congress) into the House on November 21, 2013. The legislation amended federal law to permit the Consumer Product Safety Commission to issue a safety standard for fire-safe cigarettes, allowing states to enforce regulations intended to reduce fire-related injuries and deaths. The bill became law as Public Law 113-64 on December 20, 2013, following signature by President Barack Obama.

=== Preventing Government Waste and Protecting Coal Mining Jobs in America ===
Johnson introduced the Preventing Government Waste and Protecting Coal Mining Jobs in America (H.R. 2824; 113th Congress) into the House on July 25, 2013. If passed, the bill would have amended the Surface Mining Control and Reclamation Act of 1977 to require state programs for regulation of surface coal mining to incorporate the necessary rule concerning excess spoil, coal mine waste, and buffers for perennial and intermittent streams published by the Office of Surface Mining Reclamation and Enforcement on December 12, 2008. Supporters of the bill argued that it would be good for jobs, save the government money, and improve U.S. energy production by preventing the Obama administration from introducing more coal regulations. Opponents described it as a bill that would require "OSM to implement the flawed 2008 Stream Buffer Zone rule and prevent the agency from improving that rule for a minimum of seven years".

=== Improving Trauma Care Act ===
Johnson introduced the Improving Trauma Care Act of 2014 (H.R. 3548; 113th Congress) into the House on November 20, 2013. The Bill focused on strengthening the nation’s trauma care system by improving coordination among emergency medical services, trauma centers, and federal agencies. It would amend the Public Health Service Act, with respect to trauma care and research programs, to include in the definition of "trauma" an injury resulting from extrinsic agents other than mechanical force, including those that are thermal, electrical, chemical, or radioactive. The bill was enacted as Public Law 113-152 on August 8, 2014.

=== Stream Protection Rule ===
In 2017, Johnson sponsored H.J.Res. 38, a joint resolution disapproving of a Department of the Interior regulation known as the Stream Protection Rule, which addressed environmental standards for surface coal mining. The resolution passed Congress under the Congressional Review Act and was signed into law as Public Law 115-5 on February 16, 2017, by President Donald Trump.

=== John Armor Bingham Post Office ===
During the 117th Congress, Johnson sponsored H.R. 2472, designating the United States Postal Service facility located at 82422 Cadiz Jewett Road in Cadiz, Ohio, as the John Armor Bingham Post Office. The bill was signed into law as Public Law 117-269 on December 27, 2022, by President Joe Biden.

=== Howard Arthur Tibbs Post Office ===
Johnson also sponsored H.R. 2473, which designated the United States Postal Service facility at 275 Penn Avenue in Salem, Ohio, as the Howard Arthur Tibbs Post Office. The legislation became Public Law 117-270 on December 27, 2022.

=== World War II Memorial Prayer Act ===
Johnson sponsored the House version of the World War II Memorial Prayer Act, legislation directing that the prayer delivered by President Franklin D. Roosevelt on D-Day be inscribed at the World War II Memorial in Washington, D.C. The bill was enacted in 2014 and funded through private donations, with a permanent plaque later installed at the memorial.

=== Stop the War on Coal Act ===
Johnson introduced the Stop the War on Coal Act, a legislative package intended to restrict federal agencies from issuing new regulations perceived as adversely affecting coal mining employment. The legislation passed the House of Representatives but did not receive final passage in the Senate.

=== Pass a Budget Now Act ===
Johnson sponsored H.R. 4036, the Pass a Budget Now Act, which proposed reducing congressional pay if a federal budget was not passed by April 15, as required under existing budget law. The bill was introduced but did not become law.

== Political positions ==
During the first presidency of Donald Trump, Johnson voted in line with the Republican-led position 96.8% of the time. As of September 2021, Johnson had voted in line with President Joe Biden's stated position 13.9% of the time.

=== Abortion ===
In a candidate's questionnaire in 2010, Johnson wrote, "I am pro-life, and I oppose abortion except in the case of rape, incest, and when the mother's life is in danger. Additionally, I support parental notification and a ban on partial birth abortions." During his 2010 and 2012 campaigns, Johnson was endorsed by the Ohio Right to Life PAC.

=== Environmental issues ===
In 2016, during a House committee hearing on Environmental Protection Agency regulations, Johnson criticized the agency's approach to environmental rules, arguing that its policies harmed American businesses.

Johnson was briefly criticized on an episode of Last Week Tonight with John Oliver for asking a Department of Energy representative about the financial return on investment regarding the Clean Future Act, which host John Oliver compared to asking about the financial return on investment of a fire department.

=== Gun issues ===
Johnson opposes further restrictions on gun ownership. The NRA Political Victory Fund endorsed him in 2012.

=== Health care ===
Johnson opposes the Patient Protection and Affordable Care Act and supports repealing it.

=== Immigration ===
Johnson supported President Donald Trump’s 2017 executive order restricting travel from several countries and backed a revised version after federal courts blocked the initial order.

=== Same-sex marriage ===
Johnson opposes the legalization of same-sex marriage, saying that it "undermines the integrity of the American family".

== Resignation from Congress and move to Youngstown State University ==
On November 16, 2023, the Board of Trustees at Youngstown State University offered Johnson the position of president of the university, which Johnson accepted. Johnson resigned from the House effective January 21, 2024, and assumed the presidency at Youngstown State the following day.

== Electoral history ==
Election results
Year	Office	Election	Name	Party	Votes	%	Opponent	Party	Votes	%	Opponent	Party	Votes	%	Opponent	Party	Votes	%
2010	U.S. House of Representatives	General	Bill Johnson	Republican	103,170	50.19%	Charlie Wilson	Democratic	92,823	45.15%	Richard Cadle	Constitution	5,077	2.47%	Martin Elsass	Libertarian	4,505	2.19%
2012	U.S. House of Representatives	General	Bill Johnson	Republican	164,536	53.25%	Charlie Wilson	Democratic	144,444	46.75%								
2014	U.S. House of Representatives	General	Bill Johnson	Republican	111,026	58.24%	Jennifer Garrison	Democratic	73,561	38.58%	Dennis Lambert	Green	6,065	3.18%				
2016	U.S. House of Representatives	General	Bill Johnson	Republican	213,975	70.68%	Mike Lorentz	Democratic	88,780	29.32%								
2018	U.S. House of Representatives	General	Bill Johnson	Republican	169,668	69.29%	Shawna Roberts	Democratic	75,196	30.71%								
2020	U.S. House of Representatives	General	Bill Johnson	Republican	249,130	74.41%	Shawna Roberts	Democratic	85,661	25.59%								
2022	U.S. House of Representatives	General	Bill Johnson	Republican	189,883	67.7%	Louis Lyras	Democratic	90,500	32.3%								

U.S. House of Representatives
Preceded by Charlie Wilson	Member of the U.S. House of Representatives from Ohio's 6th congressional district 2011–2024	Succeeded by Michael Rulli
U.S. order of precedence (ceremonial)
Preceded by Bob Gibbs as Former U.S. Representative	Order of precedence of the United States as Former U.S. Representative	Succeeded by Brad Wenstrup as Former U.S. Representative
