= Office of Surface Mining Reclamation and Enforcement =

Branch of the United States Department of the Interior

Agency overview
- Formed: August 3, 1977
- Headquarters: Department of the Interior - South Building 1951 Constitution Avenue, NW, Washington, D.C.
- Employees: 500 (2008)
- Annual budget: $170 million, discretionary (2008)
- Agency executive: Lanny Erdos, Director
- Parent agency: United States Department of the Interior
- Website: www.osmre.gov

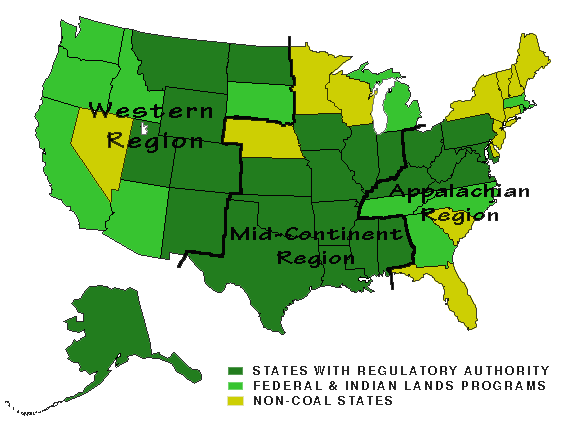
OSM Regional Structure Map

The Office of Surface Mining Reclamation and Enforcement (OSMRE) is a branch of the United States Department of the Interior. It is the federal agency entrusted with the implementation and enforcement of the Surface Mining Control and Reclamation Act of 1977 (SMCRA), which attached a per-ton fee to all extracted coal in order to fund an interest-accruing trust to be used for reclamation of abandoned mine lands, as well as established a set environmental standards that mines must follow while operating, and achieve when reclaiming mined land, in order to minimize environmental impact. OSMRE has fewer than 500 employees, who work in either the national office in Washington, DC, or of the many regional and field offices (in OSMRE's Three Regions).

OSMRE has three main functions:

- Regulating active mines
- Reclaiming lands damaged by surface mining and abandoned mines
- Providing resources for technical assistance, training, and technology development

== Regional structure ==
The OSMRE operates 3 regional offices:

The Appalachian region covers 12 states and is headquartered in Pittsburgh. On November 1, 1980, this office relocated into 10 Parkway West.

The Western division covers 9 states and is headquartered in Denver.

The Mid-Continent division covers 11 states and is headquartered in Alton, Illinois.

== Regulating active mines ==
The Office of Surface Mining is responsible for the enforcement of the Surface Mining Control and Reclamation Act of 1977; this includes setting regulatory guidelines. The actual regulation of mines is primarily done on a state level and tribal level, but OSM is charged with inspection of the state programs to meet the standard of quality. OSM regularly inspects state programs to make sure they are meeting the required standards; if they do not meet the required standards the OSM can take over. For example, when in the fiscal year of 2003 Missouri was unable to meet the federal requirements due to a lack of funding, OSMRE stepped in to assume partial control of the state program.

OSMRE took control of the following in Missouri:

- Training, examination, and certification of blasters
- Areas unsuitable for mining
- Small Operator Assistance

OSM continued to run the above parts of Missouri's mining program until Missouri improved its program, which took place on Feb. 1, 2006. Missouri now receives federal funding.

== Reclaiming abandoned mine lands ==
Abandoned mine lands are lands and waters adversely impacted by inadequately reclaimed surface coal mining operations on lands that were not subject to the reclamation requirements of the Surface Mining Law. Environmental problems associated with abandoned mine lands include surface and ground water pollution, entrances to open mines, water-filled pits, unreclaimed or inadequately reclaimed refuse piles and minesites (including some with dangerous highwalls), sediment-clogged streams, damage from landslides, and fumes and surface instability resulting from mine fires and burning coal refuse. Environmental restoration activities under the abandoned mine reclamation program correct or mitigate these problems.

=== Initiatives ===
The Appalachian Coal Country Team was founded in response to requests from watershed groups throughout coal country. The Coal Country Team arms community organizations and watershed-based projects with the training, tools, and volunteer support necessary to help local citizens become effective environmental stewards, community leaders, and accelerators of change in places indelibly marked by the environmental legacy of pre-regulatory coal mining.

OSM's Bat conservation project was begun December 15, 1998, when OSM signed a MOU with Bat Conservation International, Inc. in order to establish a framework for cooperative efforts between the two organizations to maintain and increase the conservation of bats and their habitats. Under this agreement, OSM would (1) Consider the conservation of bats and their habitats in the development and implementation of abandoned mine land (AML) reclamation standards and recommendations to States and Indian Tribes; (2) Provide assistance in the development of AML programs to help manage bats and their habitats; (3) For Federal Programs, monitor non-emergency AML shaft and portal areas for bat activity prior to reclamation; (4) As appropriate, require the use of bat gates to seal the shafts of portals where bat habitation is known and would be endangered if sealed otherwise. OSM will encourage the States and Tribes to do the same; and (5) Promote the education of OSM staff, State agencies, and Indian Tribes as to: the beneficial aspects of conserving bats, tested methods to safeguard bat habitat and public health, and ways to mitigate for loss of bat roosts and habitat.

== Related legislation ==
- Preventing Government Waste and Protecting Coal Mining Jobs in America (H.R. 2824; 113th Congress) is a bill that, if passed, would amend the Surface Mining Control and Reclamation Act of 1977 to require state programs for regulation of surface coal mining to incorporate the necessary rule concerning excess spoil, coal mine waste, and buffers for perennial and intermittent streams published by the Office of Surface Mining Reclamation and Enforcement on December 12, 2008. The bill also would require OSM to assess the effectiveness of that rule after five years of implementation and to report its findings to the Congress. Finally, the bill would prevent OSM from issuing a new rule regarding stream buffer zones until the agency completes the report required under the bill.

== See also ==
- Title 30 of the Code of Federal Regulations
- CONSOL Energy Mine Map Preservation Project
- National Mine Map Repository
- Coalie
