= Deep Seabed Hard Mineral Resources Act =

1980 federal law of the United States

- Long title: An Act to establish an interim procedure for the orderly development of hard mineral resources in the deep seabed, pending adoption of an international regime relating thereto, and for other purposes
- Acronyms (colloquial): DSHMRA
- Enacted by: the 96th United States Congress

Citations
- Public law: Pub. L. 96–283
- Statutes at Large: 94 Stat. 553

Codification
- U.S.C. sections created: 30 U.S.C. §§ 1401–1473

Legislative history
- Introduced in the House of Representatives as H.R. 2759 by John M. Murphy (D–NY-17); Committee consideration by United States House Committee on Foreign Affairs; Merchant Marine and Fisheries; Ways and Means; Interior and Insular Affairs; Passed the House of Representatives on June 9, 1980 (); Passed the Senate on June 23, 1980 with amendment; House of Representatives agreed to Senate amendment on June 25, 1980 (); Signed into law by President Jimmy Carter on June 28, 1980

The Deep Seabed Hard Mineral Resources Act (DSHMRA) is the primary federal law regulating deep sea mineral activities in areas beyond national jurisdiction (ABNJ) until the United States ratifies an international agreement. The National Oceanic and Atmospheric Administration (NOAA) administers the Deep Seabed Hard Mineral Resources Act, with the NOAA Administrator issuing exploration licenses and commercial recovery permits.

This Act is broken into three subchapters that cover exploration licenses and recovery permit requirements, plan for after an international framework is adopted, and enforcement provisions. Since its enactment in 1980, four exploration licenses have been issued and only two of these licenses are still active. In 2025, The Metals Company (TMC) submitted an application for exploratory licenses and a commercial recovery permit.

The United States is not a signatory to the current international framework, which was created after the third United Nations Conference on the Law of the Sea. Created with the ratification of the United Nations Convention on the Law of the Sea (UNCLOS), the International Seabed Authority regulates deep seabed mining, but because the United States has not ratified the treaty, it is not bound by these regulations.

In April 2025, President Donald Trump issued an Executive Order directing agencies to advance the United States' position in deep seabed mineral exploration and commercial recovery. In response to this Executive Order, NOAA issued a Notice of proposed rulemaking (NPRM) to add a rule for a consolidated exploration license and commercial recovery permit process on July 7, 2025.

== Background ==
Beginning in the seventeenth century, under the freedom of the seas doctrine, a nation's maritime jurisdiction extended to only a narrow strip of land adjacent to their coastline. All waters beyond this strip were free for all to utilize for trade, navigation, and other purposes. In the twentieth century, this principle was on the decline due to overfishing, pollution concerns, and conflicting maritime claims. The League of Nations convened in 1930 to discuss expanding national maritime claims, but was unable to come to an agreement. The United States, under President Harry S. Truman, was the first country to extend its jurisdiction in 1945 to include all natural resources on its continental shelf. With maritime claims expanding, there was a need for a comprehensive treaty on sovereign rights over territorial claims and ocean resources, and conferences were held in 1958 and 1960, but the issues over sovereign rights were not addressed fully.

In 1970, the United States voted affirmatively on United Nations General Assembly Resolution 2749 (XXV), a non-binding declaration establishing the principle of a "common heritage of humanity" for the seabed and ocean floor in areas beyond national jurisdiction. In this resolution, it was understood a future international law of the sea treaty would expand upon this principle. In 1973, a third United Nations Conference on the Law of the Sea was convened to draft the legal framework used to regulate ocean activities and resources.

In 1980, to promote the development of deep sea mineral recovery technology, Congress passed the Deep Seabed Hard Mineral Resources Act as a temporary measure while awaiting the result of the third UN Conference on the Law of the Sea and before the development and ratification of a comprehensive Law of the Sea Treaty. When the United Nations Convention on the Law of the Sea (UNCLOS) was opened for signature in 1982, the U.S. did not sign the treaty because of the regulations related to deep seabed mining in ABNJ within Part XI. An amendment to Part XI was introduced in 1994 (1994 Agreement) and enough countries ratified the treaty so it went into effect, but the U.S. did not ratify the treaty.

== Legal framework ==
The DSHMRA applies to all U.S. citizens and entities conducting mining operations in international waters. It is not an assertion of U.S. sovereignty over the seabed or mineral resources.

=== Subchapter I - Regulation of exploration and commercial recovery by United States citizens (30 U.S.C. §§ 1411–1428) ===
==== Licensing and permitting ====
- Exploration licenses: authorizes surveillance to document hard mineral resources present within the permitted area and gather information to inform the permittee's commercial recovery.
  - An application for an exploration license shall: describe the exploration area, schedule, and survey methods; include descriptions of the development and testing of systems for commercial recovery; and explain environmental protection measures.
  - An approved exploration license is valid for 10 years and can be extended, in specific circumstances, for periods not to exceed 5 years.
- Commercial recovery permits: authorizes the recovery of hard minerals with the primary purpose of commercial use.
  - An application for a recovery permit shall describe the recovery area, methods used in mineral capture and waste disposal, recovery schedule, and environmental protections and monitoring.
  - An approved commercial recovery license is valid for 20 years and will be extended if hard minerals are still being recovered in commercial quantities. A commercial recovery permit will be terminated, baring good cause, if, at the end of 10 years, a permittee is not recovering hard minerals in commercial quantities.
- Licenses that are in substantial compliance with 30 U.S.C. § 1413(a)(2) will be issued in the order in which they are received. An applicant will not lose priority of right if they amend their application to satisfy substantial compliance within the timeframe given by the NOAA Administrator.
- Transfer of a license may occur if the transferee is a U.S. citizen and if the NOAA Administrator deems the transfer to be in the public interest and the transferee's exploration or commercial recovery conduct satisfies the regulations codified within 30 U.S.C. § 1401 et seq.

==== Environmental assessment ====
- NOAA will assess the environmental impact of exploration and commercial recovery through a deep ocean mining environmental study (DOMES).
- To comply with the National Environmental Policy Act (NEPA), environmental impact statements (EIS) will be prepared by NOAA on the issuance of exploratory licenses and commercial recovery permits in consultation with the Environmental Protection Agency, Secretary of State, and the Secretary of the department in which the Coast Guard is operating. These EIS will be published in accordance to 30 U.S.C. § 1415(b).
- Discharge from ships associated with deep seabed mining activities is subject to the Clean Water Act.

==== Research ====
- NOAA shall carry out an ocean research program that studies the ecology, geology, and physical aspects of the deep seabed to assess the species and organisms affected by commercial recovery and the impacts of commercial recovery on deep seabed environment.

==== Denial challenge procedures ====
- If an applicant, licensee, or permittee disagrees with a decision regarding their application, license, or permit, they are entitled to an adjudication on the record after an agency hearing. These administrative reviews of determinations by the NOAA Administrator are subject to judicial review under 5 U.S.C. §§ 701–706 of the Administrative Procedure Act.

=== Subchapter II - Transition to international agreement (30 U.S.C. §§ 1441–1444) ===
The DSHMRA is an interim measure until there is an international agreement on the deep seabed that guarantees access to deep seabed hard minerals for U.S. citizens. When the U.S. enters into an international agreement, any provision within these subchapters that does not conflict with the international agreement shall remain in effect for U.S. citizens.

=== Subchapter III - Enforcement and miscellaneous provisions (30 U.S.C. §§ 1461–1473) ===
==== Jurisdiction ====
Any case or controversy arising under the DSHMRA is under the exclusive jurisdiction of the federal district courts.

==== Punishment ====
It unlawful for a U.S. citizen or other under U.S. jurisdiction to violate any provision under the Deep Seabed Hard Mineral Resources Act. Anyone who commits an act prohibited in 30 U.S.C. § 1461, after a hearing, shall be penalized up to $25,000 per day and be civilly liable to the U.S. Anyone who willfully and knowingly commits an act prohibited in 30 U.S.C. § 1461 is criminally liable and depending on the offense is punishable by fines up to $75,000 per day and/or up to six months of imprisonment. The fine is increased to not more than $100,000 and/or up to ten years imprisonment if a person uses a dangerous weapon or causes bodily injury to a Federal officer when violating this act.

==== Enforcement ====
The NOAA Administrator shall enforce this act, with the Coast Guard authorized to make arrests, and board, search, and seize vessels when assisting the NOAA Administrator in enforcing this act. The Coast Guard has exclusive responsibility in enforcing regulations related to the safety of life and property at sea.

== Permits issued under DSHMRA ==
In 1984, NOAA issued four exploration licenses under DSHMRA (USA-1, USA-2, USA-3, and USA-4) within the Clarion-Clipperton Zone (CCZ). Two of the exploration licenses have been relinquished; USA-1 and USA-4, both now held by Lockheed Martin, remain active through June 2, 2027.

In April 2025, an application for exploratory licenses and a commercial recovery permit under DSHMRA were submitted to NOAA by The Metals Company (TMC) for areas within the CCZ.

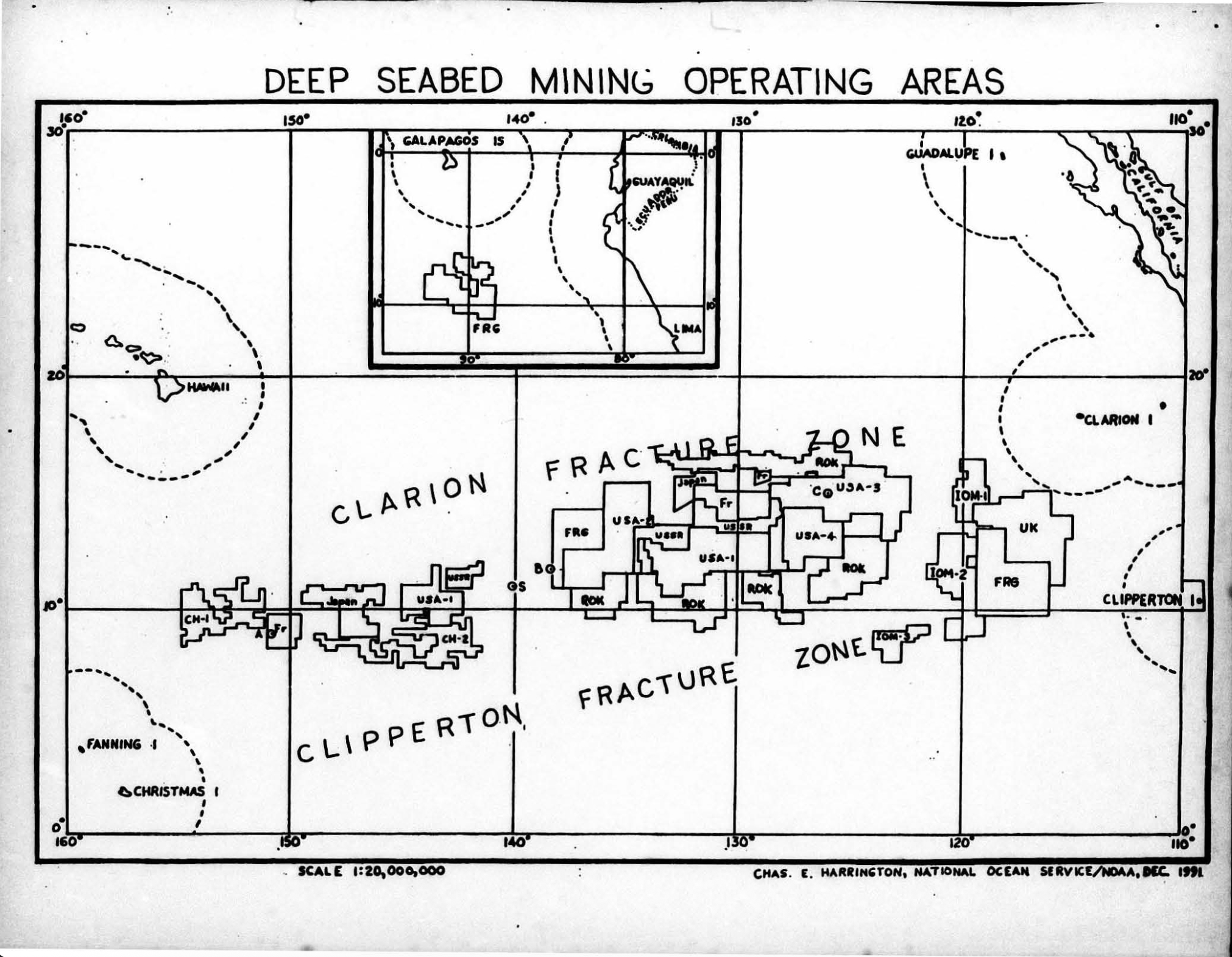
Permit areas for deep seabed mining operations within the Clarion-Clipperton Zone. Source: National Oceanic and Atmospheric Administration (NOAA), Deep Sea Mining: A Report to Congress, 1995, p. 6.

== Conflicts with UNCLOS ==
The International Seabed Authority (ISA) was established by the United Nations Convention on the Law of the Sea (UNCLOS) after the 1994 Agreement. For signatories, it regulates all deep seabed mineral activities in ABNJ. The U.S. signed the 1994 Agreement, but the Senate never ratified the Agreement, so the U.S. is not subject to the ISA's regulations. The U.S. does hold oberserver status at the ISA because the U.S. is a member of the UN.

Due to its observer-only status to UNCLOS, any recovery permit rights issued by NOAA are not recognized by the ISA nor secured internationally. An example of this lack of recognition is that in 2021, the ISA designated an area with the CCZ that overlaps with USA-1 as an Area of Particular Environmental Interest (APEI), prohibiting seabed mining activities within the APEI.

== Recent developments ==
=== Executive Order ===
In April 2025, President Donald Trump published an Executive Order directing agencies to advance the United States' position in deep seabed mineral exploration and commercial recovery. To accomplish this Executive Order, it states that NOAA should expedite the process for reviewing and issuing exploration licenses and commercial recovery permits under the DSHMRA.

=== Proposed rulemaking ===
In response to the April Executive Order, NOAA issued a notice of proposed rulemaking (NPRM) on July 7, 2025. In this NPRM, NOAA requests comments on their proposed changes to the DSHMRA regulations. In the notice, NOAA proposed promulgating a rule at § 971.214, which was reserved for later development in 1986. In this new rule, the exploratory license and commercial recovery permit process would be consolidated, so U.S. citizens could apply for both the exploration license and commercial recovery permit in one application. For a consolidated application, the NOAA Administrator would perform a consolidated review, provide opportunity for notice and comment, and if, practicable, hold a public hearing.

== See also ==
- National Environmental Policy Act
- Marine Mammal Protection Act
- Clean Water Act
