= Consol Energy Mine Map Preservation Project =

Digital preservation project for maps in Pennsylvania

CONSOL Energy Mine Map Preservation Project
- Purpose: mine map preservation, digitization and archiving
- Location: University of Pittsburgh
- Region served: Southwestern Pennsylvania
- Key people: Jeanann Haas Croft, Amy E. Baker, Ashley Cox
- Website: http://exhibit.library.pitt.edu/mine_maps/

The CONSOL Energy Mine Map Preservation Project is a project to preserve and digitize maps of underground coal mines in Southwestern Pennsylvania.

The project is a joint venture between the Pennsylvania Department of Environmental Protection, the United States Department of the Interior Office of Surface Mining, the University of Pittsburgh University Library System, and CONSOL Energy.

== Origins ==
The origin of the collection traces back to 1991, when the Pennsylvania-based coal company CONSOL Energy began depositing mine map materials at the University of Pittsburgh archives. By 2004, CONSOL Energy had donated a vast collection of records, survey books, photographs, and mining maps. Overall, the collection has grown to over 8,000 individual map sheets relating to mines operated by CONSOL Energy and its corporate subsidiaries throughout Southwestern Pennsylvania in Allegheny, Westmoreland, Washington, Greene, Fayette, and Somerset Counties. The maps are needed for mine safety, transportation planning, mine subsidence insurance. The program often consults with homeowners and developers building new properties or dealing with mine subsidence. The preservation of historic mine maps took on increased importance following the Quecreek Mine Rescue in Somerset County, Pennsylvania, where the rescue was hampered by faulty maps.

In 2009, the project received $100,000 to be paid over five years from CONSOL Energy, $75,000 from the Pennsylvania Department of Environmental Protection and $25,000 from the Office of Surface Mining.

== Map collections ==
The collection dates between 1854 and 2002, with most maps dating between 1880 and 1940. The project preservation and digitization efforts are focused on roughly 700 “hardback” maps, which are drafted by hand on heavyweight paper adhered to canvas. The hardback maps are generally oversized, sometimes 5 feet tall and 10 to 30 feet long. These maps, which were used as the "master copies" for other map reproductions, are generally considered the most complete, and sometimes the exclusive map of some abandoned mines.

== Conservation and digitization process ==
In 2007, University Library System staff members began the process of surveying, cleaning, and repairing the maps in order to stabilize them. Maps are dry cleaned with soot sponges to remove surface dirt.

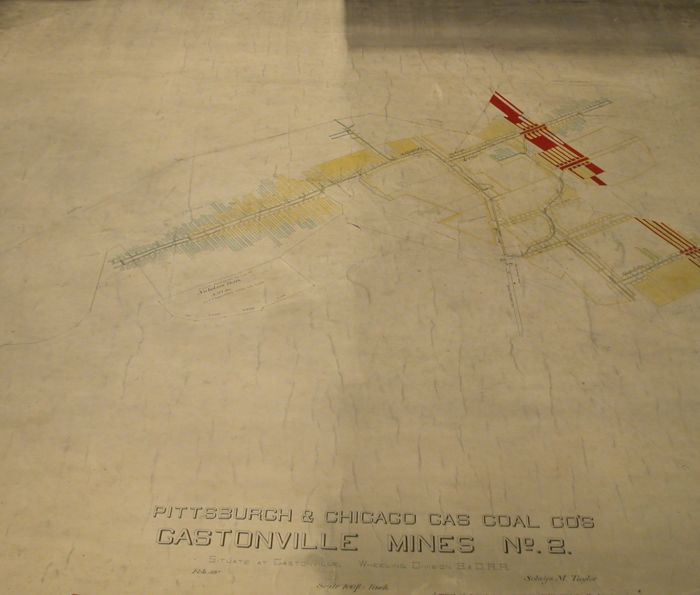
A mine map that has been cleaned with soot sponges on the left half

The canvas backing of the maps are vacuumed; those with significant damage are repaired with muslin patches and an Ethylene vinyl acetate adhesive. In order to unroll brittle maps, some of which haven't been opened in over 100 years, the conservator and student assistants use a process of humidification, flattening, and drying to safely open the maps without causing additional damage. First, the maps are placed in a large humidity dome. After 5 or 6 hours of absorbing humidity the maps can be safely unrolled. The maps dry flat between polyester webbing and wool felts overnight. The majority of student assistants performing the preservation work are enrolled in the University of Pittsburgh School of Information Sciences. Next, the maps are transferred to the Office of Surface Mining National Mine Map Repository in Green Tree, Pennsylvania, where they are catalogued and scanned into a digital format. The scanning process uses an overhead CRUSE scanner that has a suction table for maps that do not lay flat. The scanned image files are recorded in .tiff file format. The Pennsylvania Department of Environmental Protection office in California, Pennsylvania prepares then the digital files for use in geographic information system programs for use within the Pennsylvania Historical Underground Mine Maps Inventory System. The original maps are returned to University of Pittsburgh archives for permanent storage.

== Use ==
The information is proving useful to homeowners who live atop old mines, and even to developers of a new regional botanical garden.

== See also ==
- National Mine Map Repository
- Office of Surface Mining
- Pennsylvania Department of Environmental Protection
- University of Pittsburgh
- CONSOL Energy
