= Mine reclamation =

Restoration of land after mineral extraction

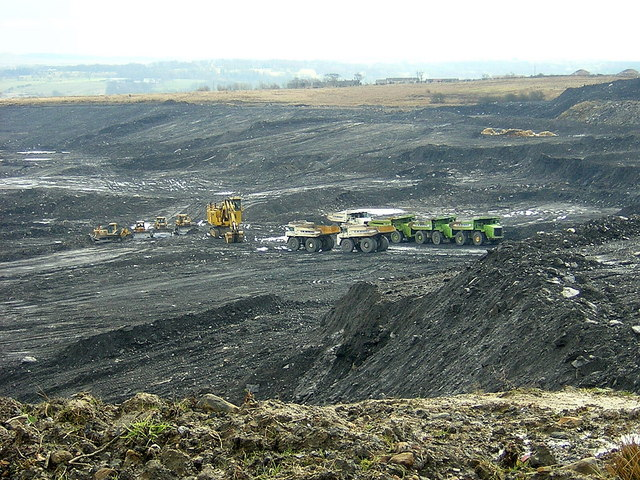
in 2006

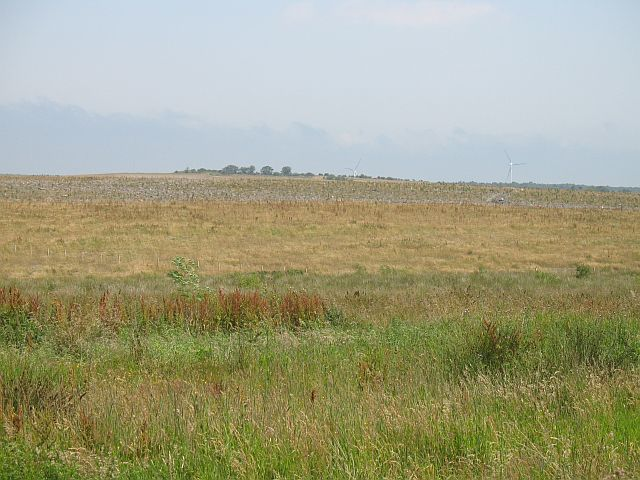
in 2008

A surface coal mine in Britain before and during the reclamation process

Mine reclamation is the process of modifying land that has been mined to restore it to an ecologically functional or economically usable state. Although the process of mine reclamation occurs once mining is complete, the planning of mine reclamation activities may occur prior to a mine being permitted or started. Mine reclamation creates useful landscapes that meet a variety of goals, ranging from the restoration of productive ecosystems to the creation of industrial and municipal resources. In the United States, mine reclamation is a regular part of modern mining practices. Modern mine reclamation reduces the environmental effects of mining.

Many abandoned mine sites have no reclamation works undertaken. The majority of mines throughout history have no stringent regulations applied. As a practice, mine reclamation began at the start of the 20th century. Returning the landscape to its original state is not possible in all cases. In most cases the physical and chemical stabilization of mine waste is the limit of mine remediation.

== Reclamation processes ==
As part of the life cycle of a surface coal mine, completed mine areas must undergo rehabilitation. When mining ends, operators must restore the land to its approximate original contour (AOC) or leave the land graded and suitable for a “higher and better” post-mining land use (PMLU) that has been approved as part of the original mining permit application. Exceptions are provided when a community or surface owner is in need of flat or gently rolling terrain. Acceptable post-mining land uses include commercial, residential, recreational, agricultural or public facility improvements.

In open cut mines rocky material is used for backfilling the excavation. A layer of soil that was stored in the premining is placed on top of the rocky material. On top of this layer is placed a layer of topsoil. The final step is the restoration of vegetation and long-term development of plant succession.

=== Forestry Reclamation Approach ===
Reforestation is a dominant way of post mining sites restoration. In some situation even spontaneous ecosystem development may result in reasonable forest cover but in most cases specific restoration approaches are used. Within the past decade, a new approach to reforestation—the Forestry Reclamation Approach, or FRA—has been promoted by state mining agencies and the Office of Surface Mining Reclamation and Enforcement (OSMRE) as an appropriate and desirable method for reclaiming coal-mined land to support forested land uses under SMCRA. This approach was developed through and is supported by research conducted through the Powell River Project, a cooperative research and education program focused on topics relevant to coal mining and reclamation in Appalachia.

The FRA establishes guidelines for achieving successful reforestation on mined lands, and can be summarized in the following five steps:

1. Create a suitable rooting medium for good tree growth that is no less than four feet deep and made of topsoil, weathered sandstone, and/or the best available material.
2. Loosely grade the topsoil or topsoil substitute established in step one to create a non-compacted growth medium.
3. Use groundcovers that are compatible with growing trees.
4. Plant two types (or more) of trees: early successional species for wildlife and soil stability, then commercially valuable crop trees.
5. Use proper tree planting techniques.

== United States ==
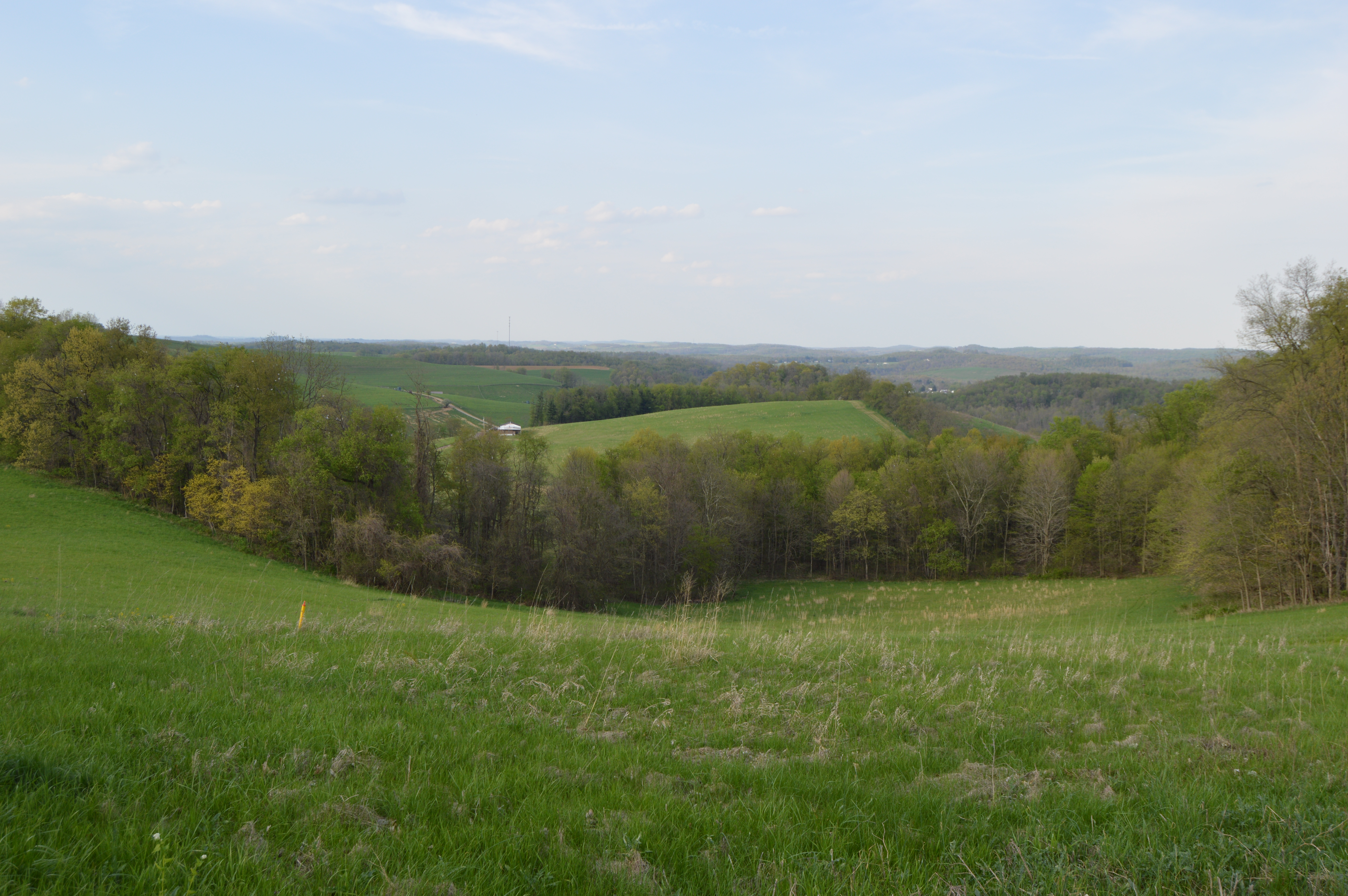
Reclaimed strip mines in southwestern Pennsylvania

Prior to 1977, there were no federal laws regulating the surface mining aspect of the coal mining industry. Although many states with mining activity had passed laws to regulate operations, the laws varied from state to state and enforcement was inconsistent. Even as states began to enact more stringent regulatory legislation after World War II, they often lacked the funding to administer and enforce the legislation. Guidelines for post-mining reclamation were generally less stringent than they are today. For example, Colorado began a voluntary reclamation program in 1965, in which the mine operators were expected to act on their own to restore mined lands.

=== Under the Surface Mining Control and Reclamation Act of 1977 ===
The Surface Mining Control and Reclamation Act of 1977 (SMCRA) is the primary federal law that regulates the environmental effects of coal mining in the United States. It established permitting guidelines for existing and future coal mines as well as a trust fund to finance the reclamation of abandoned mines. SMCRA balances the need to protect the environment from the effects of surface coal mining with the Nation's need for coal as an essential energy source. It ensures that coal mining operations are conducted in an environmentally responsible manner and that the land is adequately reclaimed during and following the mining process. Most coal-mining states now have the primary responsibility to regulate surface coal mining on lands within their jurisdiction, with the Office of Surface Mining Reclamation and Enforcement (OSMRE) performing an oversight role.

Under SMCRA, prior to receiving a mining permit, operators must present a detailed and comprehensive plan for reclaiming the land after mining has been completed. The reclamation plan must include, among other criteria, the pre-mining condition and use of the land to be mined; the proposed use of the land after reclamation; an estimated time table for the reclamation; and the steps that will be taken to comply with the relevant air and water quality laws. In addition to providing the reclamation plan, operators must also post a performance bond to ensure that monies will be available to complete the reclamation if the operator goes out of business prior to finishing the reclamation or is otherwise unable to complete the reclamation. The amount of the bond must equal the amount of the proposed reclamation plan. The bond is not released to the operator until after the state or federal regulatory office has concluded that the reclamation is successful, which could be over 10 years after the reclamation process has been completed.

=== Abandoned Mine Lands Program ===
Funding for the reclamation of abandoned mines is accomplished through a coal production tax. Mine operators must pay a tax of $0.12 per ton for underground mined coal and $0.28 per ton for surfaced mined coal; the proceeds from this tax are put into the Abandoned Mine Reclamation Fund (created by SMCRA) to pay for the reclamation of abandoned mines. A percentage of the fund is distributed to states with approved reclamation programs for their projects, and the remaining monies are used by the federal government through the OSMRE to reclaim abandoned mines in states without active programs. As of December 15, 2011, OSMRE has provided more than $7.2 billion to reclaim more than 295,000 acres of hazardous high-priority abandoned mine sites and for other purposes of abandoned mine lands have been reclaimed through the OSMRE fund since 1977.

== Germany ==
In view of the end of coal mining in Germany in 2018, the Research Institute of Post-Mining (FZN) was set up at the Technische Hochschule Georg Agricola (THGA) in Bochum in 2015. It is the very first institute of its kind in the world, which takes a holistic view of the consequences of mining, and pools the know-how required, in order to shape the post-mining period from a technical, economic and environmental perspective. Here, the focus is placed on the scientific accompaniment of the so-called eternity tasks of coal-mining in the areas of the Ruhr, the Saar as well as in Ibbenbüren, where mining, geology, geotechnical engineering, hydrogeology, electrical and information technology experts as well as mining surveyors work together across the different disciplines.

The Research Institute of Post-Mining develops monitoring processes both at the pithead and below ground and prepares the scientific principles for a sustainable pit water concept. In this respect, the institute works closely with mining and old companies, as well as authorities, water boards and regional authorities, industrial firms and universities. It also runs its own knowledge management project, which is intended to make mining and post-mining know-how available in a database.

Every two years the Research Institute of Post-Mining, together with the Arnsberg local council, organise the “NACHBergbauzeit in NRW” conference (POST-mining era in NRW).

Within the Research Institute of Post-Mining, the THGA also currently offers the world's only Master's degree course in Geotechnical Engineering and Post-Mining, which combines science and engineering, and encompasses rock mechanics, economic geology as well as hydrology, surveying and legal issues.

== See also ==
- Clean Water Act
- Mine closure
- Environmental remediation
- Holistic management
- Land rehabilitation
- Mine closure planning
- Office of Surface Mining
- Permaculture
- Surface Mining Control and Reclamation Act of 1977
