= Community Fire Safety Act of 2013 =

Bill passed by U.S. House of Representatives

- Long title: To amend the Safe Drinking Water Act to exempt fire hydrants from the prohibition on the use of lead pipes, fittings, fixtures, solder, and flux.
- Announced in: the 113th United States Congress
- Sponsored by: Rep. Bill Johnson (R, OH-6)
- Number of co-sponsors: 1

Codification
- Acts affected: Safe Drinking Water Act
- U.S.C. sections affected: 42 U.S.C. § 300f et seq.
- Agencies affected: United States Environmental Protection Agency

Legislative history
- Introduced in the House as H.R. 3588 by Rep. Bill Johnson (R, OH-6) on November 21, 2013; Committee consideration by United States House Committee on Energy and Commerce; Passed the House on December 2, 2013 (Roll Call Vote 613 384-0)

The Community Fire Safety Act of 2013 (H.R. 3588) is a bill that would prevent the Environmental Protection Agency from requiring that all new fire hydrants in the United States be lead-free beginning in 2014. The bill was passed by the United States House of Representatives during the 113th United States Congress.

== Background ==
On October 22, 2013, the Environmental Protection Agency (EPA) made an announcement about how it would apply new regulations from the 2010 Reduction of Lead In Drinking Water Act (Pub. L. 111–380 (text) (PDF)) to fire hydrants. According to the EPA, "Information available to EPA indicates that fire hydrants can be, and are, used in emergency situations to provide drinking water when there are disruptions to the normal operations of the drinking water distribution system. Therefore, as a class, hydrants would not qualify for the exclusion for pipes, fittings and fixtures used exclusively for nonpotable services." The October 22, 2013 announcement "came as a total surprise to communities whose inventories of new, uninstalled fire hydrants would be rendered obsolete on January 4." The Community Fire Safety Act of 2013 was introduced in response to this ruling from the EPA.

== Provisions of the bill ==
The Community Fire Safety Act of 2013 would amend the Safe Drinking Water Act to exempt fire hydrants from certain prohibitions against the use of lead pipes, solder, and flux.

The bill would direct the Administrator of the Environmental Protection Agency (EPA) to: (1) consult with and seek the advice of the National Drinking Water Advisory Council on potential changes to federal regulations pertaining to lead; and (2) request the Council to consider sources of lead throughout drinking water distribution systems, including through components used to reroute drinking water during distribution system repairs.

This exemption that would allow fire hydrants to continue under current previous lead guidelines is similar to the one already provided for shower valves. Toilets and bidets are already exempt as well.

== Procedural history ==
The Community Fire Safety Act of 2013 was introduced into the United States House of Representatives on November 21, 2013, by Rep. Bill Johnson (R-OH) and his co-sponsor Rep. Paul Tonko (D-NY). The bill was referred to the United States House Committee on Energy and Commerce. On December 2, 2013, the House voted to pass the bill under a suspension of the rules in Roll Call Vote 613 384-0.

== Debate and discussion ==
Supporters of the bill, including Rep. Johnson, argued that the EPA's rule would cause a nationwide shortage of fire hydrants once the new rule went into effect in January. This is due to a lack of existing fire hydrants available for installation that already meet the EPA's rule. Supporters also argued that communities would be stuck with millions of dollars' worth of non-compliant fire hydrants they could not use if the EPA's rule took effect. Adding additional urgency to the situation, winter is when more hydrants are replaced due to damage from freezing or being hit by cars driving on slippery roads.

Rep. Bill Johnson referred to the EPA's ruling as "absurd" and said that "it is unconscionable that the EPA has put our public safety at risk because during the hot summer months sometimes, somewhere kids may play in fire hydrant water." Rep Tonko said that "when Congress passed the amendments to the Safe Drinking Water Act three years ago, I doubt anyone intended to have EPA regulate hydrants."

The Association of Metropolitan Water Agencies announced to its members that it supported this bill. The American Water Works Association, Association of California Water Agencies, National Association of Water Companies, and National Rural Water Association also supported this bill.

No members of the House of Representatives voted against the bill.

== See also ==
- List of bills in the 113th United States Congress
- Drinking water quality legislation of the United States
- Water supply and sanitation in the United States
- Drinking water quality in the United States
- Lead poisoning
