= Improving Trauma Care Act of 2014 =

- Long title: To amend title XII of the Public Health Service Act to expand the definition of trauma to include thermal, electrical, chemical, radioactive, and other extrinsic agents.
- Announced in: the 113th United States Congress
- Sponsored by: Rep. Bill Johnson (R, OH-6)
- Number of co-sponsors: 0

Citations
- Public law: Pub. L. 113–152 (text) (PDF)

Codification
- Acts affected: Public Health Service Act
- Titles amended: 42 U.S.C.: Public Health and Social Welfare
- U.S.C. sections affected: 42 U.S.C. § 300d–31

Legislative history
- Introduced in the House as H.R. 3548 by Rep. Bill Johnson (R, OH-6) on November 20, 2013; Committee consideration by United States House Committee on Energy and Commerce, United States House Energy Subcommittee on Health; Passed the House on June 24, 2014 (voice vote); Passed the Senate on July 31, 2014 (unanimous consent); Signed into law by President Barack Obama on August 8, 2014

The Improving Trauma Care Act of 2014 (H.R. 3548; Pub. L. 113–152 (text) (PDF)) is a bill that would amend the Public Health Service Act, with respect to trauma care and research programs, to include in the definition of "trauma" an injury resulting from extrinsic agents other than mechanical force, including those that are thermal, electrical, chemical, or radioactive.

The bill was introduced into the United States House of Representatives during the 113th United States Congress. Similar legislation, S. 2406, was introduced in the United States Senate by Senator Jack Reed (D-RI).

== Background ==
An injury is the damage to a biological organism caused by physical harm. Major trauma is injury that can potentially lead to serious outcomes. For research purposes the definition is often based on an injury severity score (ISS) of greater than 15.

== Provisions of the bill ==
This summary is based largely on the summary provided by the Congressional Research Service, a public domain source.

The Improving Trauma Care Act of 2014 would amend the Public Health Service Act, with respect to trauma care and research programs, to include in the definition of "trauma" an injury resulting from extrinsic agents other than mechanical force, including those that are thermal, electrical, chemical, or radioactive.

== Congressional Budget Office report ==
This summary is based largely on the summary provided by the Congressional Budget Office, as ordered reported by the House Committee on Energy and Commerce on April 3, 2014. This is a public domain source.

H.R. 3548 would amend the Public Health Service Act to revise the definition of trauma as it applies to grants and activities authorized to provide support for trauma and emergency care. Under current law, the definition of trauma means an injury resulting from exposure to a mechanical force. The bill would expand the definition of trauma to also include an injury resulting from exposure to an extrinsic agent that is thermal, electrical, chemical, or radioactive.

The Congressional Budget Office (CBO) estimates that implementing the legislation would have no significant effect on the federal budget. Enacting H.R. 3548 would not affect direct spending or revenues; therefore, pay-as-you-go procedures do not apply.

The bill would not impose intergovernmental or private-sector mandates as defined in the Unfunded Mandates Reform Act and would impose no costs on state, local, or tribal governments.

== Procedural history ==
The Improving Trauma Care Act of 2014 was introduced into the United States House of Representatives on November 20, 2013 by Rep. Bill Johnson (R, OH-6). It was referred to the United States House Committee on Energy and Commerce and the United States House Energy Subcommittee on Health. On May 20, 2014, the bill was reported (amended) alongside House Report 113-458. The House voted on June 24, 2014 to pass the bill in a voice vote. The United States Senate voted on July 31, 2014 to pass with bill with unanimous consent and it was signed into law on August 8, 2014 by President Barack Obama.

== Debate and discussion ==
The American Burn Association, the American Association for the Surgery of Trauma, the American College of Emergency Physicians, America's Essential Hospitals, the American College of Surgeons, the American Trauma Society, and the Trauma Center Association of America wrote a joint letter calling themselves "organizations representing the trauma care community" in support of H.R. 3548 and the change of the statutory definition of "trauma." According to the organizations, the existing definition of "trauma" is too narrow and "excludes burn centers from participating in federal programs designed to support emergency medical care for those suffering from traumatic injuries or to compete for federal research support targeting trauma."

== See also ==
- List of bills in the 113th United States Congress
- Trauma center
