= Consol Energy =

American energy company

- Type: Subsidiary
- Traded as: NYSE: CEIX
- Industry: Coal mining, Natural Gas Production
- Founded: 1864; 162 years ago
- Fate: Merged with Arch Resources to form Core Natural Resources
- Headquarters: Cecil Township, Pennsylvania, U.S.
- Key people: William P. Powell, Chairman; Jimmy A. Brock, President & CEO; Mitesh B. Thakkar, Chief Financial Officer; Kurt R. Salvatori, Chief Administrative Officer & Executive VP; Martha A. Weigand, General Counsel and Secretary
- Products: Coal
- Services: Transportation
- Revenue: ▲US$2.042 billion (2024)
- Number of employees: 1,692
- Parent: Core Natural Resources
- Website: consolenergy.com

Consol Energy Inc. /kənˈsɒl/ is an American energy company with interests in coal headquartered in the suburb of Cecil Township, in the Southpointe complex, just outside Pittsburgh, Pennsylvania. It employs more than 1,600 people.

In 2017, Consol formed two separate entities: CNX Resources Corporation and CONSOL Energy Inc. While CNX Resources Corp. focuses on natural gas, spin-off Consol Mining Corporation, now Consol Energy Inc. focuses on coal. In 2010, Consol was the leading producer of high-BTU bituminous coal in the United States and the U.S.'s largest underground coal mining company.

In January 2025, it was announced that Consol Energy had completed its merger with Arch Resources, forming Core Natural Resources.

== History ==
=== Consolidation Coal Company (1860–1991) ===
Table of Cumberland Coal Trade Production 1865

Consol Energy was originally created in 1860 as the Consolidation Coal Company after several small mining companies in Western Maryland decided to combine their operations. The company was formally established in 1864 and headquartered in Cumberland, Maryland for the first 85 years (1864–1945), where the company became the largest bituminous coal company in the eastern United States. In 1909, Consolidation consolidated with Fairmont Coal Company of West Virginia and the Somerset Coal Company in Pennsylvania. Executives in the first half of the 20th century included Aretas B. Fleming and Clarence W. Watson.

Western Maryland's coal production rose about 1 million short tons in 1865, exceeded 4 million short tons by the turn of the century, and reached an all-time high of about 6 million short tons in 1907. A small amount of the coal production in the early 1900s was premium smithing coal (as in blacksmith) that was specially processed and delivered in boxcars to customers throughout the United States and Canada. In 1945, Consolidation Coal Company was merged with Pittsburgh Coal Company and its headquarters were moved to Western Pennsylvania.

With growing demand for natural gas in the U.S. following World War II, Consolidation Coal Company was acquired by the Continental Oil Company, or Conoco, in 1966. By the mid-1970s, Consolidation Coal Company operated 56 mines and employed nearly 20,000 miners. In 1981, Conoco along with Consolidation Coal Company was acquired by DuPont, which then sold some of its coal mining interests in Pennsylvania to the German energy company, Rheinbraun A.G.

=== Consol Energy (1991–present) ===
Looking to invest in coal reserves in North America, Rheinbraun A.G offered Dupont stakes in coal mines and $890 million in 1991 to join in an equal part joint venture creating Consol Energy. Despite the cost of coal dropping in the 1990s, Consol's long-term contracts and investments in longwall mining techniques allowed the company to remain competitive. In 1998, Dupont sold the large majority of its stake in Consol, leaving it with only a 6 percent share and Rheinbraun A.G with a 94 percent interest. Consol also acquired Rochester & Pittsburgh Coal Company in 1998.

In 1999, Consol underwent a public offering (NYSE: CNX) in order to pay down some of the debt the company had incurred with the majority buy-out from Dupont and the acquisition of Rochester & Pittsburgh Coal Company. Due to uncertainty surrounding demand for coal in the early 2000s, Consol began to place a greater emphasis on diversification, primarily into natural gas. Consol's first major natural gas investment was through the acquisition of MCN Energy Group Inc.'s methane reserves in southwestern Virginia for $160 million. In 2001, Consol acquired Conoco Inc.'s coalbed methane gas production assets in southwestern Virginia.

Consol subsidiaries CNX Ventures and CNX Land Resources also began diversification efforts during this time into methane gas and timber and farming. In 2006, Consol spun off its subsidiary CNX Gas as a standalone company, but retained 83 percent of the new company's shares. On June 28, 2006, Consol Energy entered the S&P 500 replacing Knight-Ridder. In 2007, CNX Gas also began investing heavily in natural gas exploration in the Marcellus Shale in Pennsylvania. In 2010, Consol acquired Dominion Resources Inc.'s natural gas production and exploration assets for 3.74 billion dollars, which included nearly 500,000 acres of Marcellus potential, tripling Consol's position in the Marcellus to approximately 750,000 acres. Consol also acquired all of the remaining publicly owned shares of CNX Gas for a cash payment of $991 million.

In 2010, Consol was also named by Forbes magazine as one of the "100 Most Trustworthy Companies." In 2011, Consol entered into two separate joint venture agreements to expedite its natural gas production. The first, an agreement with Noble Energy was to jointly develop the company's 663,350 Marcellus Shale acres in Pennsylvania and West Virginia. The second joint agreement, with Hess Corporation, jointly explored and developed Consol's nearly 200,000 Utica Shale acres in Ohio. Consol also began an expansion of its Baltimore Terminal in 2011 to increase capacity from 14 million to 16 million tons to increase its revenue from sales of its metallurgical coal.

In 2017, Consol Energy Inc. spun off from CNX Resources Group. Officially announced on November 29, 2017, this move marked the start of Consol Energy Inc. operating as an independent, publicly traded company.

In August 2024, Consol Energy and Arch Resources announced that they entered into a definitive agreement to combine in an all-stock merger of equals to create Core Natural Resources.

In January 2025, the merger was successfully completed. Shares of Core Natural Resources started trading on January 15, 2025 on the New York Stock Exchange under the ticker symbol "CNR" the following day.

== Operations and financials ==
=== Divisions and areas of business ===
Consol Energy operates as a producer of coal, primarily for electric power generation. Consol also maintains support services including Baltimore Marine Terminal and Land Division.

Consol Energy's flagship operation is the Pennsylvania Mining Complex, which includes three large underground mines capable of producing approximately 28.5 million tons of coal per year. Consol's coal division received the U.S. Department of the Interior's Office of Surface Mining National Award for Excellence in Surface Mining for the company's innovative reclamation practices in 2002, 2003, and 2004.

Consol's Gas Division deals with natural gas exploration, development and production, producing nearly 128 billion cubic feet of coalbed methane in 2010. With the acquisition of the exploration and production business of Dominion Resources in 2010, the company has access to over 3.7 trillion cubic feet of proved clean-burning natural gas reserves in Pennsylvania, West Virginia and Ohio, including coalbed methane and shale beds. The company currently has nearly 13,000 net producing wells.

As the owner of more than 430,000 surface acres in the U.S. and Canada, Consol Energy has a Land Division that oversees various projects, including selling reserve land that the company does not develop, land donation and conservation projects. Consol Energy has also been recognized for its reclamation efforts by national and state governments and has worked in partnership with several conservation groups on land reclamation projects. Consol's Baltimore Marine Terminal provides coal transshipment services from rail cars to ocean transport ships.

Consol's Water Division is involved in water purification with a focus on treating wastewater produced as a byproduct of hydraulic fracturing. The company operates reverse osmosis water purification plants and has a minority interest in a company that develops solar-powered water purification systems which, as of July 2012, was conducting a pilot test at one of Consol's gas drilling sites. Consol also maintained the Fairmont Supply Company, dedicated to the sale and distribution of mining services and equipment. However, in 2015, Consol sold that Company. Additionally, the company operates the largest privately owned research and development facility in the industry that is devoted exclusively to coal and energy utilization and production.

=== Financials ===
In 2018, Consol Energy had an annual revenue of $1.53 billion. Consol Energy was ranked number 428 on the Fortune 500 list in 2011. In 2024, Consol Energy had a revenue of 2.042 billion $ and was ranked 980 in the Fortune 1000.

== Corporate responsibility ==
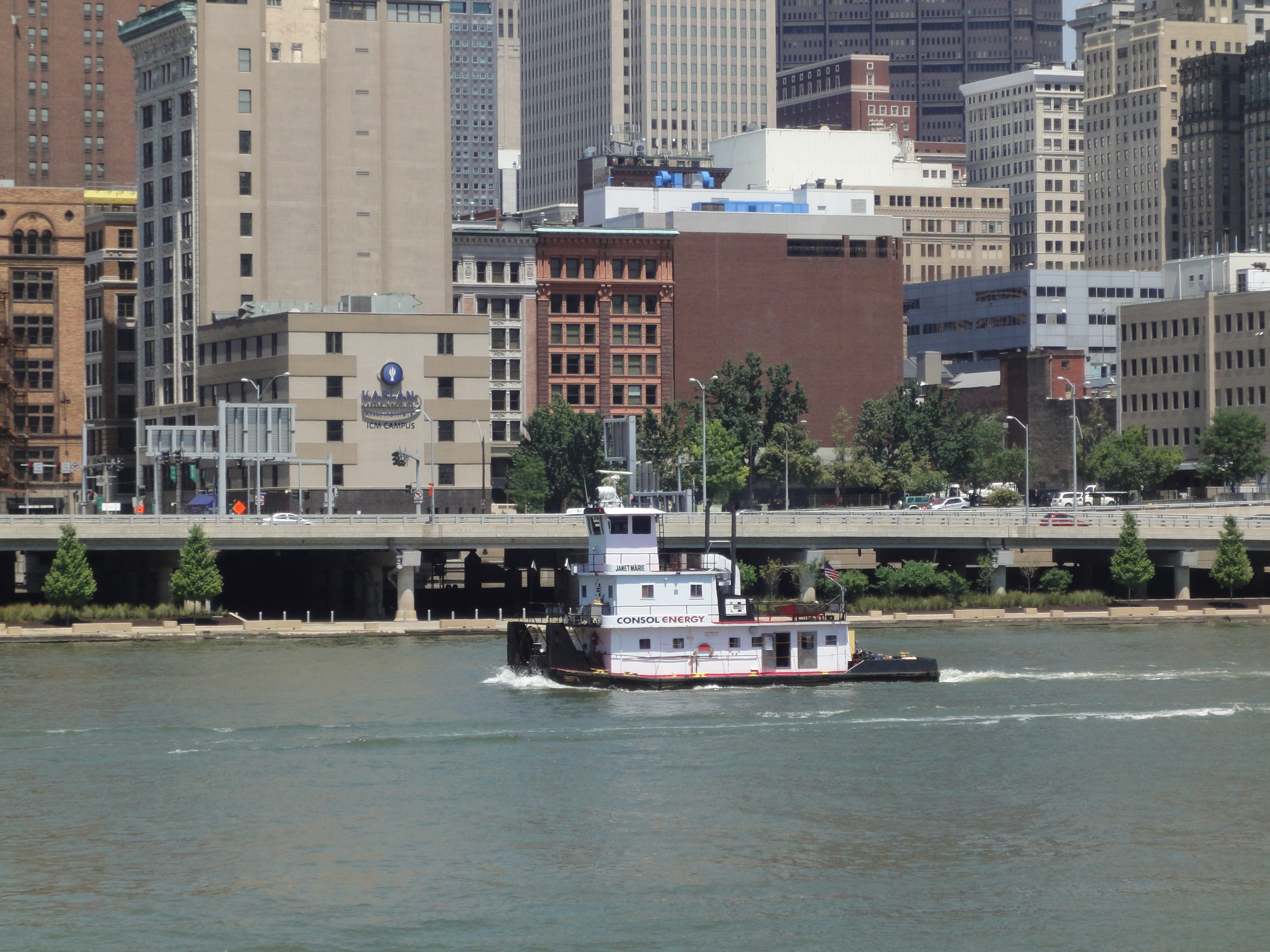
Boat formerly operated by Consol Energy passing downtown Pittsburgh, PA.

=== Environmental record ===
In September 2009, several thousand fish were killed in Dunkard Creek, Monongalia County, West Virginia. While state officials attributed the fish kill to a golden algae bloom, an investigation by the Environmental Protection Agency claimed that mining discharges from Consol Energy's Blacksville No. 2 mine created the conditions for the golden algae bloom. After halting operations at the mine following the fish kill, Consol was allowed to continue mining operations after coming to an agreement with the West Virginia Department of Environmental Protection to submit a proposal for discharge treatment plants by April 15 of 2010. Consol also invested $200 million in a water treatment facility and paid a $5.5 million federal penalty to the U.S. Department of Justice and half to the West Virginia Department of Environmental Protection in 2011. The company maintains that it was never found liable for the fish kill.

As a producer of coal and natural gas, the environmental impact of coal mining and natural gas drilling has been a subject of controversy for Consol Energy. Despite this, the company has been recognized for its efforts at environmental protection and was awarded the U.S. Environmental Protection Agency Climate Protection Award in 2002. Additionally, Consol maintains ongoing environmental efforts aimed at restoring and enhancing property managed by the company and has worked with conservation groups including Ducks Unlimited and the National Wild Turkey Federation on habitat restoration efforts.

=== Political involvement ===
An ad by the National Rifle Association of America critical of President Barack Obama that was filmed on Consol's Blacksville No. 2 coal mine in West Virginia became an issue of political debate in 2009. The National Rifle Association intended to ask miners the question "How do you feel about having your Second Amendment rights taken away if Obama becomes president." Word spread among pro-Obama miners who contacted their union, the United Mine Workers of America, resulting in 440 miners taking the day off to avoid appearing in the ad in a contract-sanctioned protest, halting production at Consol's Blacksville No. 2 coal mine.

Lobbying efforts on the part of Consol have also been an issue of controversy. In the first quarter of 2010, Consol spent $1.02 million in lobbying expenses on issues relating to the coal mining and natural gas industries. Furthermore, in all of 2010, Consol spent $3.25 million in lobbying expenditures.

== Naming rights ==
Consol Energy has previously put its name to two sports facilities in its Pittsburgh-area. In 2007, Consol Energy purchased the naming rights to Washington, Pennsylvania's minor league baseball team the Washington Wild Things' field, Consol Energy Park. Consol Energy has let the naming rights deal expire as of January 2017.

Consol later purchased the naming rights to the Consol Energy Center in 2008; the arena that hosts the Pittsburgh Penguins National Hockey League team. It is estimated that Consol Energy won the bid for naming rights at a cost between $2.0 - $4.0 million per year, for 21 years. As of October 2016 the Consol Energy Center has been renamed PPG Paints Arena as Consol Energy has ended its naming rights of the venue.

== See also ==
- Farmington Mine disaster
- Cumberland and Pennsylvania Railroad
- CONSOL Energy Mine Map Preservation Project
