= Hodel v. Virginia Surface Mining & Reclamation Ass'n =

- Supreme Court of the United States

Argued February 23, 1981 Decided June 15, 1981
- Full case name: Donald P. Hodel v. Virginia Surface Mining and Reclamation Association
- Citations: 452 U.S. 264 (more) 101 S.Ct. 2352
- Argument: Oral argument

Case history
- Prior: 483 F. Supp. 425 (W.D. Va. 1980)

Court membership
- Chief Justice Warren E. Burger Associate Justices William J. Brennan Jr. · Potter Stewart; Byron White · Thurgood Marshall; Harry Blackmun · Lewis F. Powell Jr. William Rehnquist · John P. Stevens

Case opinions
- Majority: Marshall, joined by unanimous
- Concurrence: Burger
- Concurrence: Powell
- Concurrence: Rehnquist

Laws applied
- Commerce Clause and Surface Mining Control and Reclamation Act of 1977

Hodel v. Virginia Surface Mining & Reclamation Ass'n, 452 U.S. 264 (1981), is a United States Supreme Court case that unanimously held that the Commerce Clause allowed Congress to pass the Surface Mining Control and Reclamation Act of 1977, which regulated surface mining on private property, because of this environmentally destructive industry's substantial effects on interstate commerce.

== Background ==
Starting in the 1930s, coal mines shifted from underground mining to surface mining, in which the soil and rock overlying the mined resources are also removed. While this approach is far cheaper than underground mining, it destroys above-ground habitats and increases air, noise, and water pollution. After some state governments' attempts to regulate surface mining spurred others into a race to the bottom to cater to this environmentally destructive industry, Congress passed the Surface Mining Control and Reclamation Act of 1977 (SMCRA) to uniformly regulate surface mining on both public and private property.

In October 1978, the Virginia Surface Mining and Reclamation Association, individual landowners, and the Virginia state government petitioned the US District Court for the Western District of Virginia for a pre-enforcement injunction on SMCRA. While the District Court rejected Commerce Clause, Equal Protection Clause, and substantive due process claims, it cited National League of Cities v. Usery to issue the injunction over a perceived encroachment on state police power. In that 1976 case, the Supreme Court ruled that the Fair Labor Standards Act of 1938 could not be applied to state employers under the Commerce Clause because it would diminish their sovereignty.

Additionally, the District Court ruled that these federal environmental regulations would constitute a regulatory taking requiring just compensation under the Fifth Amendment.

== Supreme Court ==
In a unanimous decision written by Associate Justice Thurgood Marshall, the Supreme Court upheld the constitutionality of SMCRA. The Supreme Court rejected the surface mines' claim that the Commerce Clause does not allow the federal government to regulate private land since the Property Clause only describes federal power over its public land. Citing Heart of Atlanta Motel, Inc. v. United States, Marshall highlighted that rational basis review of federal law under the Commerce Clause had previously upheld regulations on private business activities that substantially affect interstate commerce. The Supreme Court held that this law passes rational basis review by recognizing Congress' six years of pre-enactment findings that "surface coal mining activities have imposed large social costs on the public [...] in many areas of the country in the form of unreclaimed lands, water pollution, erosion, floods, slope failures, loss of fish and wildlife resources, and a decline in natural beauty".

While National League of Cities v. Usery would not be overruled until four years later in Garcia v. San Antonio Metropolitan Transit Authority, Marshall considered that case inapplicable to this dispute because the entities being regulated were private surface mines, rather than state governments. While SMCRA preempts state laws, the Supremacy Clause permits the federal government to do so when it is exercising one of its other powers.

Finally, the Supreme Court noted that facial challenges require plaintiffs to show that all applications of a law are unconstitutional, whereas not all applications of SMCRA would prompt claims under the Takings Clause.

=== Concurrences ===
Associate Justice William Rehnquist concurred with Marshall's judgement, but he argued against a gradual widening of federal power under past Commerce Clause case law. Chief Justice Warren E. Burger wrote a separate concurrence reiterating that Congress can only regulate activities with a substantial effect on interstate commerce, rather than all activities that affect commerce.

Associate Justice Lewis F. Powell Jr. concurred in criticizing the District Court for considering the regulatory takings of a specific case in a facial challenge. However, Powell noted that the plaintiffs would be likely to prevail in post-enforcement litigation because in most regions of Virginia suitable for surface coal mining, the land is too steep to grow crops or timber.
