= National Mine Map Repository =

Agency overview
- Formed: 1982
- Type: Office
- Headquarters: Pittsburgh, Pennsylvania
- Parent agency: Office of Surface Mining Reclamation and Enforcement
- Website: www.osmre.gov/mmr

The National Mine Map Repository (NMMR) is part of the United States Department of the Interior (DOI), Office of Surface Mining Reclamation and Enforcement (OSMRE or OSM). The NMMR resides in the Pittsburgh suburb of Green Tree, Pennsylvania, and collects and maintains mine map information and images for the entire country, including data and maps of coal mines in the anthracite coal region of northeastern Pennsylvania. The Green Tree facility provides and stores, digitally and in microfilm (aperture cards), over 182,000 maps of abandoned mines. This repository contains maps of mine workings from the 1790s to the present day. It serves as a point of reference for mine maps and other information for both surface and underground mines throughout the United States. It also serves as a location to retrieve mine maps in an emergency. The NMMR provides services ranging from retrieving mine related data for economic analysis to assessing the potential risk associated with underground mining. Through analysis of mine maps and related information, the repository assists private and public sectors in industrial and commercial development, highway construction, and the preservation of public health, safety, and welfare. In addition, they collect, reproduce, and maintain a national inventory of mine maps and supporting documentation for private and public interests.

== History ==
The Federal Coal Mine Health and Safety Act of 1969 established a national mine map repository. The repository was funded by and assigned to the Department of the Interior, Bureau of Mines (BOM) in 1970. A repository was set up at a BOM office in Pittsburgh and Wilkes-Barre, Pennsylvania and covered all states east of the Mississippi River with the exception of Louisiana and Minnesota. These two states, together with Arizona, New Mexico, North Dakota, South Dakota, Wyoming, Utah, Colorado, Missouri, and Kansas, were covered by a separate repository at the BOM Intermountain Field Operation Center in Denver, Colorado. A fourth repository, in Spokane, Washington, held the mining archives for the western states of Washington, Oregon, California, Nevada, Montana, and Idaho.

In 1982 the responsibility of maintaining the repository and its staff was formally transferred to DOI's Office of Surface Mining Reclamation and Enforcement. Later, when BOM was dissolved in 1996, all of the maps from the BOM offices were consolidated into the current OSMRE Pittsburgh repository. The Wilkes-Barre repository was closed in 2011, and its collection transferred to the Pittsburgh office, which is designated as the National Mine Map Repository.

The mission of the repository has always been to obtain authoritative maps on past and current mining operations and preserve them on microfilm. Higher priority is given to maps of mines in areas where the potential for adverse impact to the environment is more significant. The NMMR, in addition to being an archival entity concerned with the preservation of mine maps, is also a basic reference file of information on mines. The information is made available to federal and state geological surveys, state mining bureaus, mining companies, oil and gas companies, conservationists, research and planning organizations, water pollution boards, city and industrial planners, highway engineers, building contractors, real estate developers and private citizens.

Today the NMMR facility is equipped with modern map scanning and archiving capability to digitize maps. The primary archival method remains microfilm although the repository's holdings are increasingly available in digital format.

== Available information ==
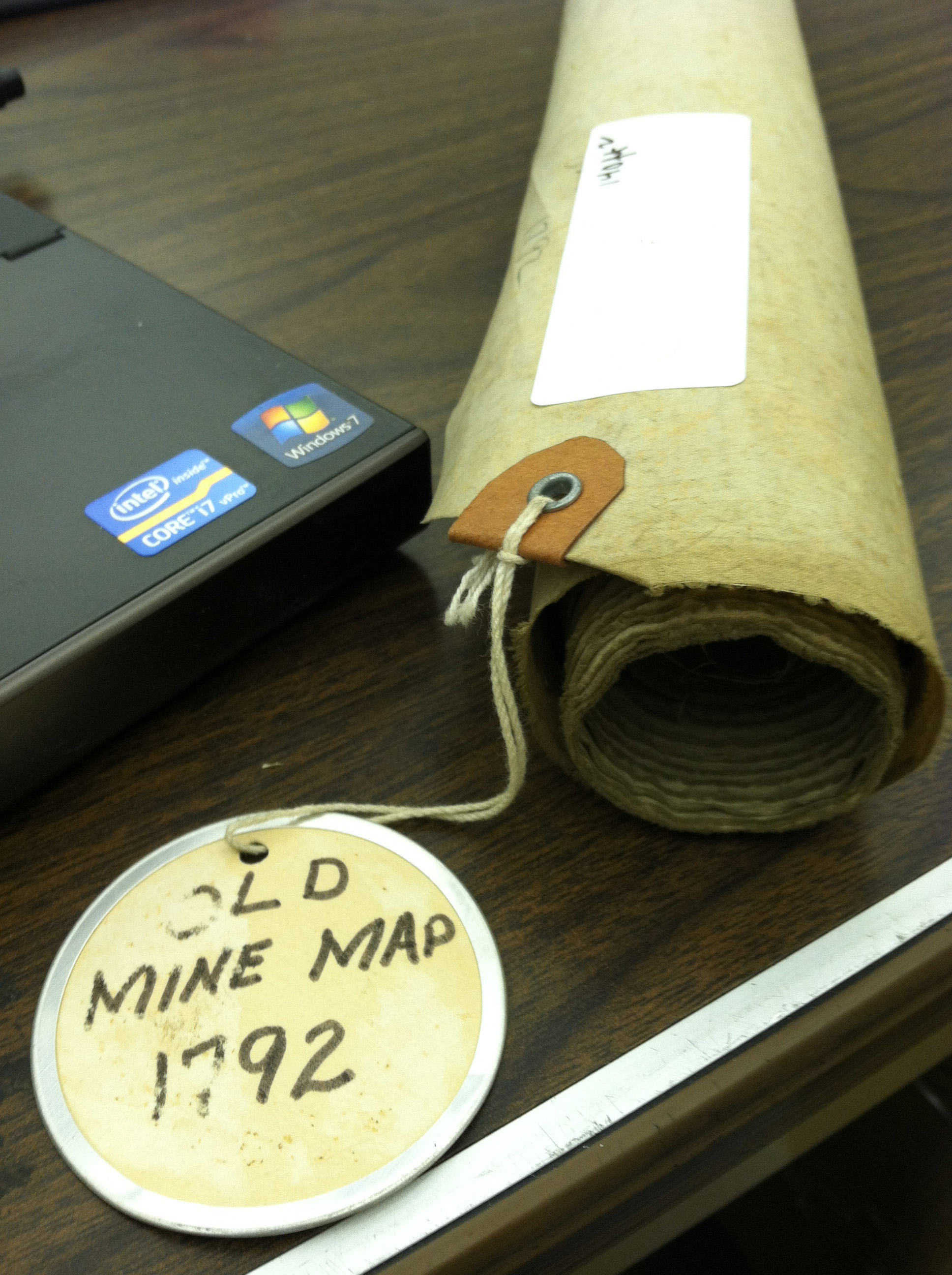
NMMR's oldest mine: 1792 anthracite coal, "Old Mine."

One of NMMR's oldest mine maps: 1859 anthracite coal map from Hazleton Coal Co.

The NMMR contains digital and microfilm maps of surface and underground coal, metal, and non-metal mines throughout the United States. Some of the information that can be obtained from the repository includes:

- Mine and company names
- Underground mine plans
  - Mains, rooms, and pillars
  - Man-ways, shafts, mine surface openings, barrier pillars and ventilation facilities
- Closure (final) maps
- Adjacent mines
- Geological information
  - Bed name, bed thickness, depth, drill hole data, cross-sections, elevation contours, structures, outcrops, assays
- Geographical data
  - Abandoned railroad lines and stations, coal towns, surface facilities, roads, ponds, streams, and property survey points
- Districts, townships, sections, ranges, counties and municipalities, latitudes and longitudes, elevation bench marks, and surface elevations
- Gas well, oil well, and drill hole locations

== Map acquisition and archiving ==
The NMMR acquires maps through public outreach directed at state and federal environmental agencies as well as mining companies, engineering and consulting firms, surveying companies, universities, and private citizens. The repository is constantly seeking donations of mine maps to add to the microfilm/digital collection.

When maps are received from a donor, they are scanned and stored in both microfilm and digital archives. The maps, along with a scanned images (upon request), are returned to the donor. The repository does not retain hard copies of maps.

=== Procedures ===
As maps are obtained at the repository, they are assigned a unique six-digit identification number (document number). Data sheets are prepared for each map giving all available information including: map document number; state; county; mine name; mine ID number (MSHA); company name; mine type; and both the Universal Transverse Mercator (UTM) grid zone and the latitude and longitude of the geo-located point on the map. This information is input into the Mine Map Index System. The sorted maps are then scanned into a digital format and stored on the repository's dedicated 500 terabyte mass storage array.

The NMMR utilizes different types of scanning equipment to facilitate archiving mine maps made available in a variety of media.

Cruse scanner 60x90"

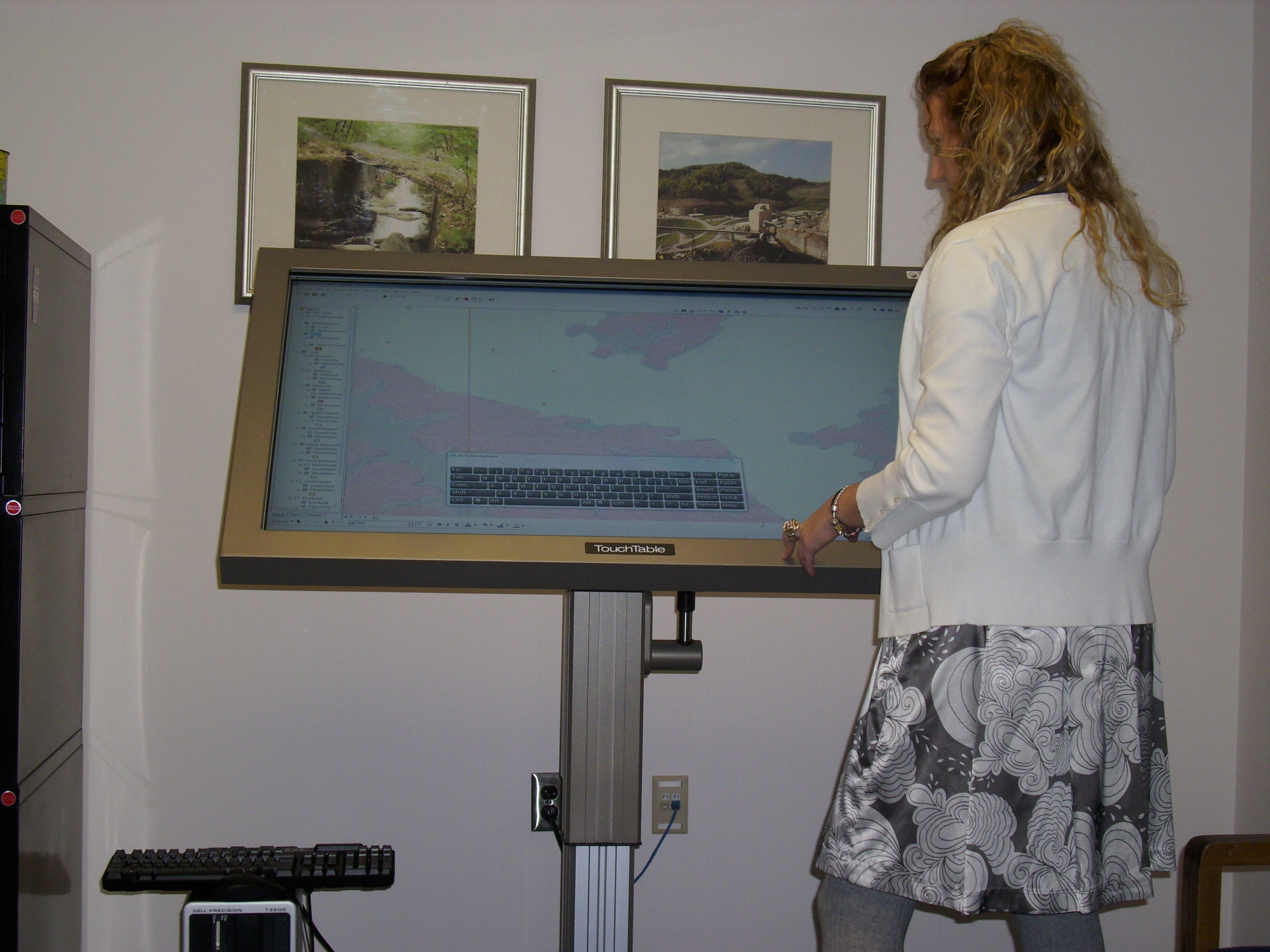
NMMR's TouchTable, a touch-sensitive map collaboration tool

- 2 Cruse Table Scanners: CD 285/1100 ST/FA; CS 220 ST
  - Scan area: 58x90"; 48x72"
  - Black and white, 8- or 16-bit grayscale, 24-, 36-, or 48-bit color
  - 220-630 dpi
  - File size: 1.1 GB
- TouchTable
  - 46" 1080p display
  - 1920 x 1080 pixel native resolution
  - High brightness (450 nits)
  - High contrast (800:1)
  - Displays data on a touch-sensitive table surface
  - Geographically separated teams can visualize and share ideas in real-time
- 5 Wicks and Wilson C-Series aperture card scanners
  - Up to 400 dpi
  - Black and white, or grayscale
  - Programmable reduction ratio
  - 2 scanners have ability to auto-feed
  - Scan silver or diazo film
- Colortrac Gx+ T56 extra-wide format scanner
  - Accepts thick media (.8")
  - Up to 600 dpi
  - 1.5"/sec scan speed
  - Instant on, bi-directional LED illumination system

Small, portable aperture card scanners are shipped to state agencies as part of an extensive initiative to map underground mines.

== Map gallery ==
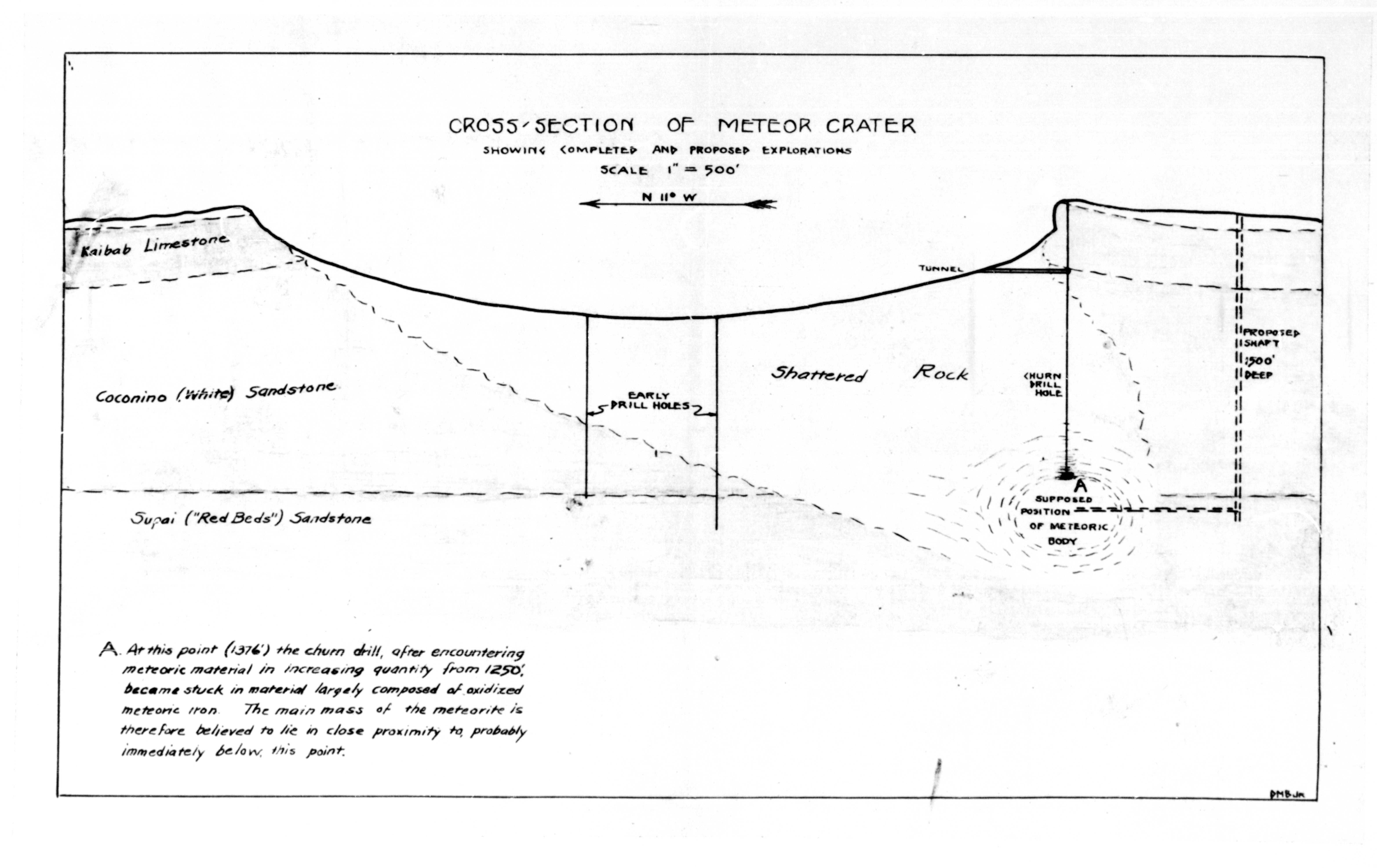
Plan to mine Meteor Crater, AZ

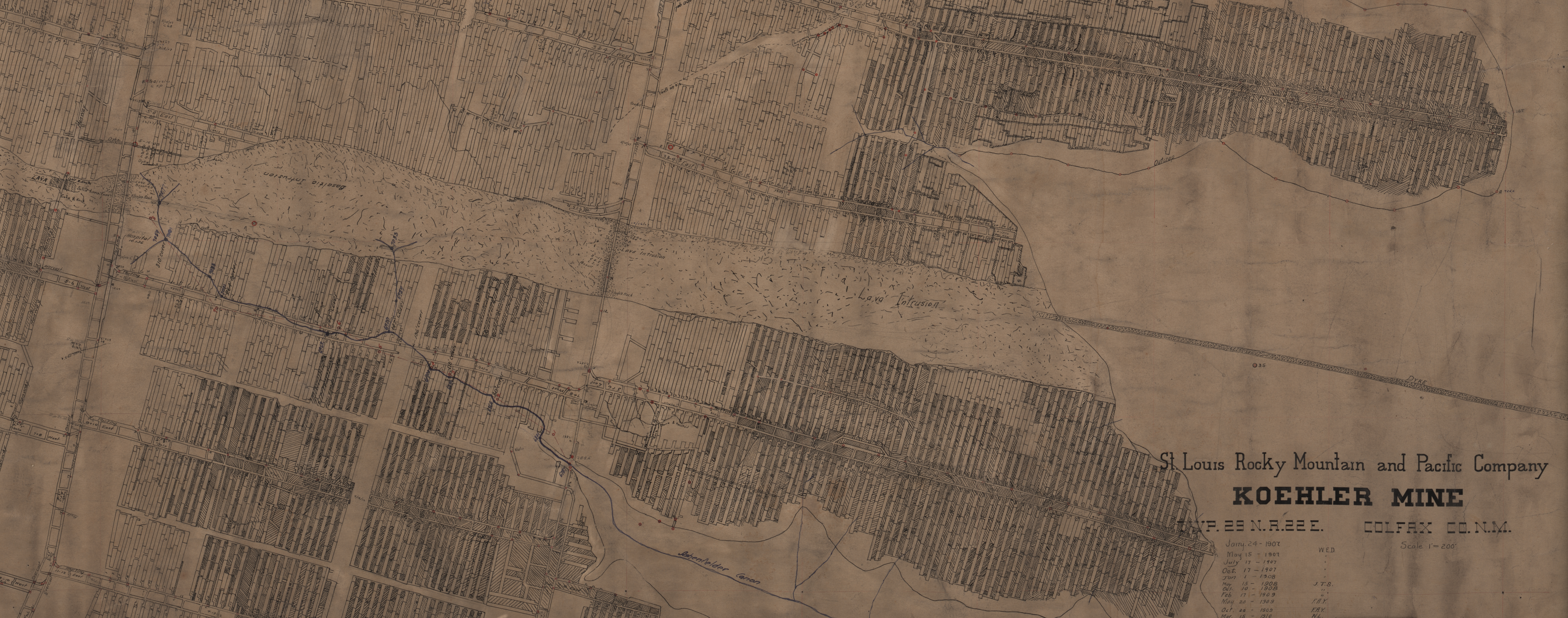
Koehler Mine, Colfax Co., NM with lava inclusions

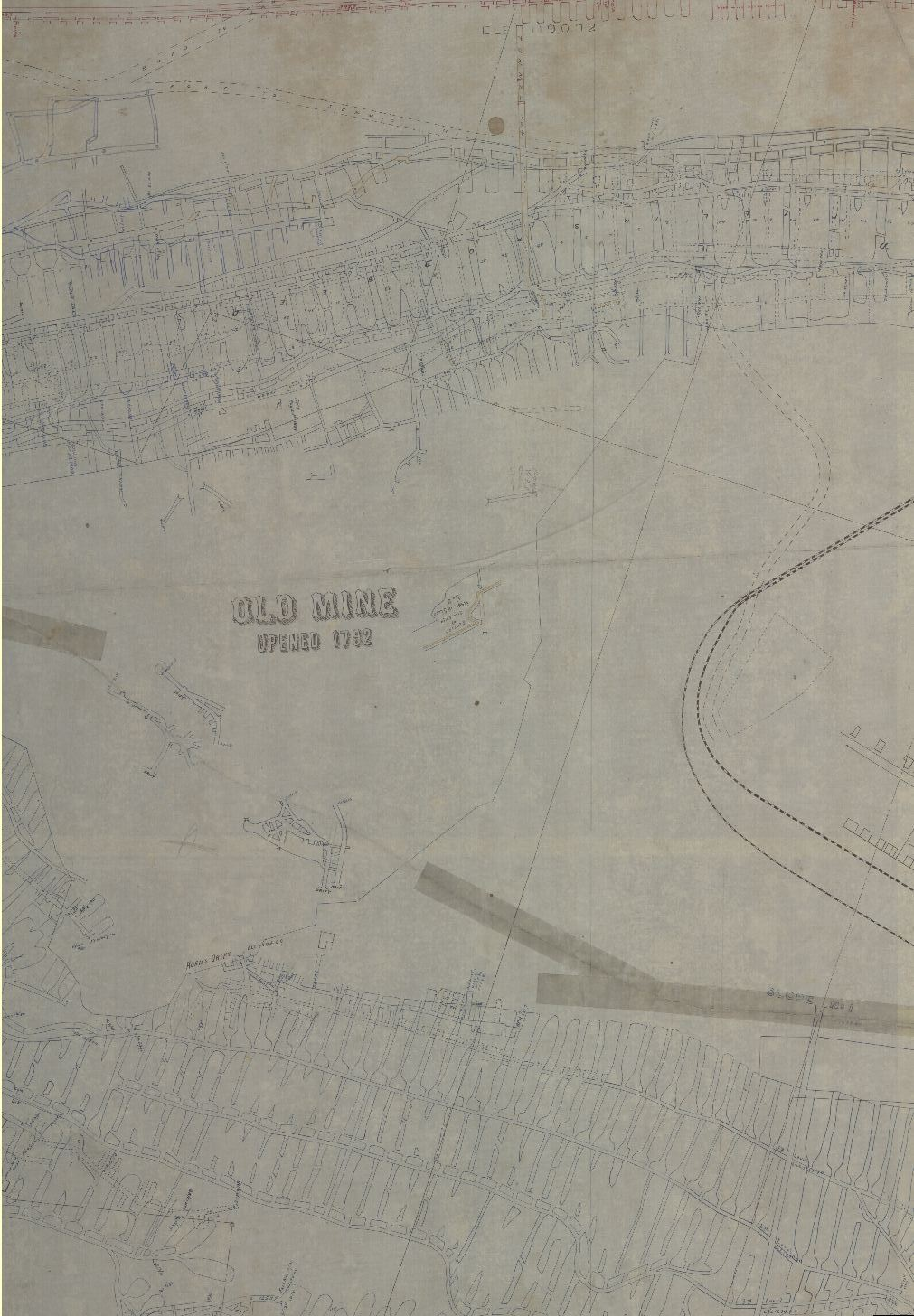
Section of NMMR's oldest mine, Old Mine 1792

== See also ==
- CONSOL Energy Mine Map Preservation Project
- Table of Historical Maps
