= Federal Mine Safety and Health Act of 1977 =

Law amendment

Mine Safety and Health Act of 1977
- Other short titles: Federal Mine Safety and Health Amendments Act of 1977
- Long title: An Act to promote safety and health in the mining industry, to prevent recurring disasters in the mining industry, and for other purposes.
- Acronyms (colloquial): FMSHA, MSHA
- Nicknames: Federal Mine Safety and Health Amendments Act
- Enacted by: the 95th United States Congress
- Effective: March 9, 1978

Citations
- Public law: 95-164
- Statutes at Large: 91 Stat. 1290

Codification
- Acts amended: Federal Coal Mine Health and Safety Act of 1969
- Titles amended: 30 U.S.C.: Mineral Lands and Mining
- U.S.C. sections amended: 30 U.S.C. ch. 22 § 801 et seq.

Legislative history
- Introduced in the Senate as S. 717 by Harrison A. Williams (D–NJ) on February 11, 1977; Committee consideration by Senate Human Resources; Passed the Senate on June 21, 1977 (78-18); Passed the House on July 15, 1977 (244-88, in lieu of H.R. 4287); Reported by the joint conference committee on October 3, 1977; agreed to by the Senate on October 6, 1977 (agreed) and by the House on October 27, 1977 (376-35); Signed into law by President Jimmy Carter on November 9, 1977

The Federal Mine Safety and Health Act of 1977 (Public Law 95-164) amended the Coal Mine Safety and Health Act of 1969. It can be found in the United States Code under Title 30, Mineral Lands and Mining, Chapter 22, Mine Safety and Health.

The S. 717 legislation was passed by the 95th United States Congressional session and enacted into law by the 39th President of the United States Jimmy Carter on November 9, 1977. S. 717 was drafted largely by Mike Goldberg of the Senate Labor Committee staff and James H. Rathlesberger, the special assistant in the Office of the Secretary of the Interior who oversaw the Mine Safety and Health Administration (MSHA) until the bill transferred it to the Labor Department.

The law of the United States enacted on November 9, 1977, took effect one hundred and twenty days later. It had been supported by the United Mine Workers of America, Carter Administration and others but opposed by the mining industry.

== Main provisions ==
- combination of coal, metal and non metal mines under single legislation
- retention of separate health and safety standards for coal mining
- transfer of enforcement from the Department of Interior to the Department of Labor
- renaming of the Mine Enforcement Safety Administration (MESA) as Mine Safety and Health Administration (MSHA)
- four annual inspections of underground coal mines
- two annual inspections of all surface mines
- elimination of advisory standards for metal and nonmetal mines
- discontinuation of state enforcement plans
- mandating of miner training
- requirement of mine rescue teams for all underground mines
- provision of increased involvement of miners and their representatives in health and safety activities

== See also ==
- Coal mining in the United States
- List of coal mines in the United States
- Mining accident
- Occupational Safety and Health Act
