= Mine closure planning =

Mine closure planning involves planning effectively for the after-mining landscape – all activities required before, during, and after the operating life of a mine that are needed to produce an acceptable landscape economically. Closure performance refers to the activities near and after mine closure and how well activities listed in the closure plan are carried out.

== Overview ==
A mine begins to close the day it opens. Decisions made during the mine planning and development phase – and even earlier, during the exploration phase – have profound effects on the ultimate closure plan, its cost, and the resulting landscape performance. These decisions need to be made within a framework of closure planning to realize successful land reclamation.

Activities related to closure planning often include: preparation of detailed drawings of disturbed landscape, compilation of baseline information, discussions with regulators and stakeholders on end land use considerations, crafting of supporting research programs, and preparation of budgets and schedules. For a mine nearing closure, the closure plan takes the form of a decommissioning plan, and includes details and selection of mitigative technologies (especially for acid rock drainage) and other specific reclamation and closure activities.

A critical element of successful reclamation and of good closure planning is stakeholder involvement. Generally, mines do a poor job of ongoing, meaningful stakeholder consultation, and many would benefit from professional assistance. A particularly useful consultation process involves forming a local committee to provide guidance to one or more mines in the region in their reclamation and closure activities with a focus on providing ongoing dialog with stakeholders and identifying the goals important to stakeholders.

The most important benefit of closure planning is identification of critical activities to achieve successful reclamation. Closure planning usually identifies areas of needed research. It also identifies planning constraints (and sometimes opportunities) especially identifying safe methods and locations for tailings storage. These plans provide some assurance that the mine is not “painting itself into a corner” and provide a starting basis to estimate financial assurance levels – important to both mines and regulators. It also forms a base case against which future planning changes can be compared. Much of this work falls under the concept of “design for closure” introduced 30 years ago.

== Documentation ==
Typical closure plans are 100 to 200 page documents that require several months to prepare and cost approximately US$200,000. They are usually developed by the supervisor of the environmental department, or by a mining, environmental, or geotechnical consultant. They are submitted at the request of the regulatory authority and are used by the mine for life of mine costing.

Most closure planning documents share the same format:

1. Introduction
2. Predevelopment conditions
3. Mine operations explained
4. Landscape performance goals (and regulatory requirements)
5. Reclamation technologies and methods
6. Reclamation plans, balances, waste isolation methods
7. Long term monitoring and maintenance plans
8. Landscape performance prediction
9. Comparison of the performance prediction relative to the goals
10. Schedules and costs
11. Financial assurance

== See also ==
- Care and maintenance
