= Surface Mining Control and Reclamation Act of 1977 =

United States law regulating coal mining

- Long title: An Act to provide for the cooperation between the Secretary of the Interior and the States with respect to the regulation of surface coal mining operations, and the acquisition and reclamation of abandoned mines, and for other purposes.
- Acronyms (colloquial): SMCRA
- Enacted by: the 95th United States Congress
- Effective: August 3, 1977

Citations
- Public law: 95-87
- Statutes at Large: 91 Stat. 445

Codification
- Titles amended: 30 U.S.C.: Mineral Lands and Mining
- U.S.C. sections created: 30 U.S.C. ch. 25 § 1201 et seq.

Legislative history
- Introduced in the House as H.R. 2 by Mo Udall (D–AZ) on January 31, 1977; Committee consideration by House Interior and Insular Affairs, Senate Energy and Natural Resources; Passed the Senate on May 20, 1977 (57-8, in lieu of S. 7); Reported by the joint conference committee on July 12, 1977; agreed to by the Senate on July 20, 1977 (85-8) and by the House on July 21, 1977 (325-68); Signed into law by President Jimmy Carter on August 3, 1977

United States Supreme Court cases
- Hodel v. Virginia Surface Mining and Reclamation Association, 452 U.S. 264 (1981)

The Surface Mining Control and Reclamation Act of 1977 (SMCRA) is the primary federal law that regulates the environmental effects of coal mining in the United States.

SMCRA created two programs: one for regulating active coal mines and a second for reclaiming abandoned mine lands. SMCRA also created the Office of Surface Mining, an agency within the Department of the Interior, to promulgate regulations, to fund state regulatory and reclamation efforts, and to ensure consistency among state regulatory programs.

== Passage ==
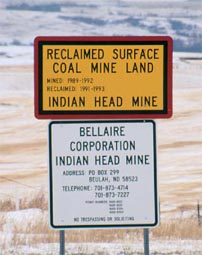
Sign at Indian Head Mine, near Beulah, ND. Photo: Chuck Meyers, OSM.

SMCRA grew out of a concern about the environmental effects of strip mining. Coal had been mined in the United States since the 1740s, but surface mining did not become widespread until the 1930s. At the end of that decade, states began to enact the first laws regulating the coal mining industry: West Virginia in 1939, Indiana in 1941, Illinois in 1943, and Pennsylvania in 1945. Despite those laws, the great demand for coal during World War II led to coal being mined with little regard for environmental consequences. After the war, states continued to enact and expand regulatory programs, some of which required mining permits or the posting of bonds to ensure that the land could be reclaimed after mining was complete. But these state laws were largely unsuccessful at stemming the environmental impacts of surface mining. One problem was that the law varied from state to state, enabling mining operations to relocate to states where regulations were less strict. Meanwhile, surface mining became increasingly common: in 1963 just 33 percent of American coal came from surface mines; by 1973 that figure reached 60 percent.

In 1974 and 1975 Congress sent mining regulation bills to President Gerald Ford, but he vetoed them out of concern that they would harm the coal industry, increase inflation, and restrict the energy supply. As Jimmy Carter campaigned in Appalachia in 1976, he promised to sign those bills. Congress sent him a bill that was even more stringent than those vetoed by Ford, and President Carter signed it into law on August 3, 1977.

=== Regulatory program ===
The regulation of active mines under SMCRA has five major components:

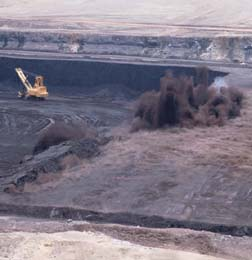
Blasting a coal seam in Gillette, Wyoming. Photo: Chuck Meyers, OSM.

- Standards of Performance. SMCRA and its implementing regulations set environmental standards that mines must follow while operating, and achieve when reclaiming mined land.
- Permitting. SMCRA requires that companies obtain permits before conducting surface mining. Permit applications must describe what the premining environmental conditions and land use are, what the proposed mining and reclamation will be, how the mine will meet the SMCRA performance standards, and how the land will be used after reclamation is complete. This information is intended to help the government determine whether to allow the mine and set requirements in the permit that will protect the environment.
- Bonding. SMCRA requires that mining companies post a bond sufficient to cover the cost of reclaiming the site. This is meant to ensure that the mining site will be reclaimed even if the company goes out of business or fails to clean up the land for some other reason. The bond is not released until the mining site has been fully reclaimed and the government has (after five years in the East and ten years in the West) found that the reclamation was successful.
- Inspection and Enforcement. SMCRA gives government regulators the authority to inspect mining operations, and to punish companies that violate SMCRA or an equivalent state statute. Inspectors can issue "notices of violation," which require operators to correct problems within a certain amount of time; levy fines; or order that mining cease.
- Land Restrictions. SMCRA prohibits surface mining altogether on certain lands, such as in National Parks and wilderness areas. It also allows citizens to challenge proposed surface mining operations on the ground that they will cause too much environmental harm.

=== Reclamation program ===
SMCRA created an Abandoned Mine Land (AML) fund to pay for the cleanup of mine lands abandoned before the passage of the statute in 1977. The law was amended in 1990 to allow funds to be spent on the reclamation of mines abandoned after 1977. The fund is financed by a tax of 31.5 cents per ton for surface mined coal, 15 cents per ton for coal mined underground, and 10 cents per ton for lignite. 80% of AML fees are distributed to states with an approved reclamation program (see below) to fund reclamation activities. The remaining 20% are used by OSM to respond to emergencies such as landslides, land subsidence, and fires, and to carry out high priority cleanups in states without approved programs. States with approved programs can also use AML funds to set up programs to insure homeowners against land subsidence caused by underground mining.

=== State/federal relationship ===
In Hodel v. Virginia Surface Mining and Reclamation Association, 452 U.S. 264 (1981) the Supreme Court of the United States found the SMCRA does not violate the Tenth Amendment to the United States Constitution. Like most environmental statutes passed in the 1960s and 1970s, SMCRA uses a cooperative federalism approach under which states are expected to take the lead in regulation while the federal government oversees their efforts.

Under SMCRA, the federal government can approve a program, which gives the state the authority to regulate mining operations, if the state demonstrates that it has a law that is at least as strict as SMCRA, and that they have a regulatory agency with the wherewithal to operate the program. Currently, most coal-mining states have approved programs. Those states issue their own permits, inspect their mines, and take enforcement action themselves when necessary. In the two states without approved programs (Tennessee and Washington) and on Indian Reservations, the Office of Surface Mining performs those functions. The federal government is required to regulate surface coal mining on federal lands (which include 60 percent of the coal reserves in the West), but can enter into cooperative agreements with states with approved programs.

=== Self-bonding ===
Many states do not require large mining companies to post a surety bond for the costs of mine reclamation. Instead, these companies can hold their own assets as "self-bonding". The bankruptcy of large coal mining companies may imperil the $3.7 billion state regulators have allowed in self-bonding. For example, shortly before it declared bankruptcy Peabody Energy held $1.47 billion in self-bonding liabilities, including $900.5 million in Wyoming alone.

== See also ==
- Mine closure planning
- Mine reclamation
- RECLAIM Act
- Before the Mountain Was Moved
