= Mine closure =

Process of decommissioning a mine

Mine closure is the period of time when the ore-extracting activities of a mine have ceased, and final decommissioning and mine reclamation are being completed. It is generally associated with reduced employment levels, which can have a significant negative impact on local economies. It is also the period when the majority of mine reclamation is completed, making the land safe and useful again.

In South Africa, which is a major mining country, closure planning has not yet been formalized. This has led to a range of unintended consequences that have the potential to become sovereign risk if not adequately managed.

Closure planning, a relative newcomer to mine planning, continues throughout the life of a mine, starting with conceptual closure plans prior to production, periodic updates throughout the life of the mine, and a final decommissioning plan. This is captured more coherently in the Australian Model to mine closure.

At most mines, progressive reclamation over the life of the mine is used to reduce the reclamation burden at closure.

Most mine shafts are capped, meaning a large concrete plug around 3 feet thick is placed over the shaft to cover it and stop fatal accidents from occurring. Some mines are capped using large metallic grills, this usual occurs on deep level shafts so airflow through the deep tunnels helps prevent subsidence.

Older mines typically used wood beams, a foot or more thick, under loose rock and dirt as caps. Over time the wood rots and sinkholes can develop. These mines are typically recapped with concrete, steel plates, expanding foam, or a combination of each.

Steel plates are used primarily on horizontal shafts, but are used on vertical shafts occasionally. Doors are added if access is needed. Holes are cut into the plate to allow for drainage as well as for a bat entrance.

Expanding foam is used primarily with vertical shafts where the use of the shaft is no longer desired. It forms a plug 6 feet or more thick. A 4-to-6-inch (100 to 150 mm) pipe through the plug allows for pressure equalization as well as for water drainage, or even as a bat entrance if necessary.

Closure planning has two distinct components. On-site planning is mostly about environmental rehabilitation and returning the landform to a reasonable condition where vegetative recovery is enhanced. Off-mine closure is about loss of livelihood, which is a more complex issue. An element of this is generating an offset against the high clost of environmental remediation, which in certain cases can exceed the value of the mineral that was mined in the first place.

== See also ==
- Care and maintenance
