= Federal Coal Mine Health and Safety Act of 1969 =

1969 U.S. law regulating the coal industry

- Long title: An Act to provide for the protection of the health and safety of persons working in the coal mining industry of the United States, and for other purposes.
- Acronyms (colloquial): FCMHSA, CMHSA
- Nicknames: Coal Act
- Enacted by: the 91st United States Congress
- Effective: December 30, 1969

Citations
- Public law: 91-173
- Statutes at Large: 83 Stat. 742

Codification
- Titles amended: 30 U.S.C.: Mineral Lands and Mining
- U.S.C. sections created: 30 U.S.C. ch. 22 § 801 et seq.

Legislative history
- Introduced in the Senate as S. 2917 by Harrison A. Williams (D–NJ) on September 17, 1969; Committee consideration by Senate Labor and Public Welfare; Passed the Senate on October 2, 1969 (passed); Passed the House on October 29, 1969 (passed); Reported by the joint conference committee on December 17, 1969; agreed to by the House on December 17, 1969 (agreed) and by the Senate on December 18, 1969 (agreed); Signed into law by President Richard Nixon on December 30, 1969

Major amendments
- Mine Safety and Health Act of 1977

The Federal Coal Mine Health and Safety Act of 1969, U.S. Public Law 91-173, generally referred to as the Coal Act, was passed by the 91st United States Congressional session and enacted into law by the 37th President of the United States Richard Nixon on December 30, 1969.

The S. 2917 legislation created the Mining Enforcement and Safety Administration (MESA), later renamed the Mine Safety and Health Administration (MSHA), as well as a National Mine Map Repository, within the Department of the Interior.

The MSHA's responsibilities paralleled those of Occupational Safety and Health Administration (OSHA) but addressed underground and surface mining of coal. The legislation was more comprehensive and stringent than previous federal laws governing the mining industry.

The Coal Act required two annual inspections of every surface coal mine and four at every underground coal mine, and dramatically increased federal enforcement powers in coal mines. The Coal Act also required monetary penalties for all violations, and established criminal penalties for knowing and willful violations. The safety standards for all coal mines were strengthened, and health standards were adopted.

The Coal Act also included specific procedures for the development of improved mandatory health and safety standards, and provided compensation for miners who were totally and permanently disabled by the progressive respiratory disease caused by the inhalation of fine coal dust pneumoconiosis or "black lung".

In regard to the mine map repository, the Coal Act required that:

"Whenever an operator permanently closes or abandons a coal mine, or temporarily closes a coal mine for a period of more than ninety days, he shall promptly notify the Secretary of such closure. Within sixty days of the permanent closure or abandonment of the mine, or, when the mine is temporarily closed, upon the expiration of a period of ninety days from the date of closure, the operator shall file with the Secretary a copy of the mine map revised and supplemented to the date of the closure."

Initial enforcement of the law was slow due to understaffed enforcement agencies, a situation which was criticized when the Hurricane Creek mine disaster occurred a year to the day after passage of the act, killing 38 men in a mine with a long history of violations.

It was updated by the Federal Mine Safety and Health Act of 1977, Public Law 95-164.

== See also ==
- National Mine Map Repository
- Coal mining in the United States
- List of coal mines in the United States
- Mining accident
- Occupational Safety and Health Act
