= Geothermal Energy Research, Development, and Demonstration Act of 1974 =

Geothermal Energy Research, Development, and Demonstration Act

93rd United States Congress
- Long title: Geothermal Energy Research, Development, and Demonstration Act of 1974
- Signed by: Gerald Ford
- Signed: September 3, 1974
- Status: Repealed

For the Geothermal Energy Act of 1980, please see Geothermal Act.

The Geothermal Energy Research, Development, and Demonstration Act of 1974 was enacted by the 93rd U.S. Congress on September 3, 1974 (H.R. 14920) to address the critical shortage of environmentally acceptable forms of energy. Congress found that some geothermal resources contain valuable byproducts such as potable water and mineral compounds which should be processed and recovered as national resources.

== The Geothermal Energy Coordination and Management Project ==
The act established the Geothermal Energy Coordination and Management Project which shall be composed of six members as follows:

- One to be appointed by the President.
- An assistant director of the National Science Foundation (NSF)
- An Assistant Secretary of the Department of the Interior
- An Assistant Administrator of the National Aeronautics and Space Administration (NASA)
- The General Manager of the Atomic Energy Commission
- An Assistance Administrator of the Federal Energy Administration (the predecessor to the Department of Energy)

The project goal is for the effective management and coordination in terms of a national geothermal energy research, development, and demonstration program.

== The Geothermal Loan Guarantee Program (GLGP) ==
The act gives the Chairman of the Project the authority to designate an appropriate Federal agency to guarantee loans for the commercial applications of geothermal energy. The head of the designated agency is authorized, in consultation with the Secretary of the Treasury, to guarantee loans from lenders to qualified borrowers for the development of geothermal energy projects.

As of 1980, the program was managed by the Assistant Secretary for Resource Applications at the Department of Energy (DOE).

=== Geothermal Resource Development Fund ===
The act also gives the Treasury of the United States the Geothermal Resource Development Fund for the head of the designated agency to provide loan guaranties as well as to provide the interest assistance program authorized by the act.

=== Loan limits ===
With the GLGP, 100% of a loan could have a federal guarantee with a limit of the loan being 75% of project costs. This was subsequently amended in 1980 to allow for a federal guarantee of 90% of the total aggregate project cost providing that the applicant was an electric, housing or other cooperative or a municipality. The limitations, however, were:

- The loans were limited to $100 million per project.
- No qualified borrower was to receive more than $200 million in loans.

== Criticism ==
According to paper presented at the World Geothermal Congress in 2005 of the International Geothermal Association, the program had two deficiencies:

- The strict guidelines of the loan guaranty left those who could have likely received the loans without the guarantee as the most likely candidates for the program.
- Utilities avoided the program because default, even with the guarantee program, would have been a detriment to their credit ratings.

== Reporting requirements ==
The chairman of the project shall submit annual reports to the President and Congress, and to provide as an accurate a judgement as is possible as to the extent that the act met its objectives by June. 30, 1980.
