= Title 30 of the United States Code =

U.S. federal statutes on mining

Title 30 of the United States Code outlines the role of mineral lands and mining in the United States Code.

- 30 U.S.C. ch. 1—United States Bureau of Mines
- 30 U.S.C. ch. 2—Mineral Lands and Regulations in General
- 30 U.S.C. ch. 3—Lands Containing Coal, Oil, Gas, Salts, Asphaltic Materials, Sodium, Sulphur, and Building Stone
- 30 U.S.C. ch. 3A—Leases and Prospecting Permits
- 30 U.S.C. ch. 4—Lease of Gold, Silver, or Quicksilver Deposits When Title Confirmed by Court of Private Land Claims
- 30 U.S.C. ch. 5—Lease of Oil and Gas Deposits in or under Railroads and Other Rights-of-Way
- 30 U.S.C. ch. 6—Synthetic Liquid Fuel Demonstration Plants
- 30 U.S.C. ch. 7—Lease Of Mineral Deposits Within Acquired Lands
- 30 U.S.C. ch. 8—Development of Lignite Coal Resources
- 30 U.S.C. ch. 9—Rare And Precious Metals Experiment Station
- 30 U.S.C. ch. 10—Coal Mine Safety
- 30 U.S.C. ch. 11—Mining Claims on Lands Subject To Mineral Leasing Laws
- 30 U.S.C. ch. 12—Multiple Mineral Development of the Same Tracts
- 30 U.S.C. ch. 12A—Entry and Location on Coal Lands on Discovery of Source Material
- 30 U.S.C. ch. 13—Control of Coal-Mine Fires
- 30 U.S.C. ch. 14—Anthracite Mine Drainage and Flood Control
- 30 U.S.C. ch. 15—Surface Resources
- 30 U.S.C. ch. 16—Mineral Development of Lands Withdrawn for Power Development
- 30 U.S.C. ch. 17—Exploration Program for Discovery of Minerals
- 30 U.S.C. ch. 18—Coal Research and Development
- 30 U.S.C. ch. 19—Lead and Zinc Stabilization Program
- 30 U.S.C. ch. 20—Conveyances to Occupants of Unpatented Mining Claims
- 30 U.S.C. ch. 21—Metal and Nonmetallic Mine Safety
- 30 U.S.C. ch. 22—Mine Safety and Health
- 30 U.S.C. ch. 23—Geothermal Steam and Associated Geothermal Resources
- 30 U.S.C. ch. 24—Geothermal Energy Research, Development, and Demonstration
- 30 U.S.C. ch. 25—Surface Mining Control and Reclamation
- 30 U.S.C. ch. 26—Deep Seabed Hard Mineral Resources
- 30 U.S.C. ch. 27—Geothermal Energy
- 30 U.S.C. ch. 28—Materials and Minerals Policy, Research, and Development
- 30 U.S.C. ch. 29—Oil and Gas Royalty Management
- 30 U.S.C. ch. 30—National Critical Materials Council
- 30 U.S.C. ch. 31—Marine Mineral Resources Research
- 30 U.S.C. ch. 32—Methane Hydrate Research and Development
