= Wyoming =

U.S. state

- State
- Flag Seal
- Nicknames: Equality State (official); Cowboy State; Big Wyoming
- Motto: Equal Rights
- Anthem: "Wyoming"
- Location of Wyoming within the United States
- Country: United States
- Before statehood: Wyoming Territory
- Admitted to the Union: July 10, 1890 (44th)
- Capital (and largest city): Cheyenne
- Largest county or equivalent: Laramie
- Largest metro and urban areas: Cheyenne

Government
  - Governor: Mark Gordon (R)
  - Secretary of State: Chuck Gray (R) (Note: If the governor dies, resigns or is (via impeachment conviction) removed from office, the secretary of state is first in line to become governor.)
- Legislature: Wyoming Legislature
  - Upper house: Senate
  - Lower house: House of Representatives
- Judiciary: Wyoming Supreme Court
- U.S. senators: John Barrasso (R); Cynthia Lummis (R)
- U.S. House delegation: Harriet Hageman (R) (list)

Area
  - Total: 97,813 sq mi (253,335 km^{2})
  - Rank: 10th

Dimensions
  - Length: 372 mi (599 km)
  - Width: 280 mi (451 km)
- Elevation: 6,690 ft (2,040 m)
- Highest elevation (Gannett Peak (Note: Elevation adjusted to North American Vertical Datum of 1988)): 13,809 ft (4,209.1 m)
- Lowest elevation (Belle Fourche River at South Dakota border): 3,100 ft (945 m)

Population (2025)
  - Total: ▲588,753
  - Rank: 50th
  - Density: 5.9/sq mi (2.28/km^{2})
  - Rank: 49th
  - Median household income: $72,400 (2023)
  - Income rank: 31st
- Demonyms: Wyomingite, Wyomingian

Language
  - Official language: English
- Time zone: UTC−07:00 (Mountain)
  - Summer (DST): UTC−06:00 (MDT)
- USPS abbreviation: WY
- ISO 3166 code: US-WY
- Traditional abbreviation: Wyo.
- Latitude: 41°N to 45°N
- Longitude: 104°3'W to 111°3'W
- Website: www.wyo.gov

Wyoming (/waɪˈoʊmɪŋ/ wy-OH-ming) is a landlocked state in the Mountain West subregion of the Western United States. It borders Montana to the north and northwest, South Dakota and Nebraska to the east, Idaho to the west, Utah to the southwest, and Colorado to the south. With an estimated population of 587,618 as of 2024, Wyoming is the least populous state despite being the tenth-largest by area, and it has the second-lowest population density. The state capital and most populous city is Cheyenne.

Wyoming's western half consists mostly of the ranges and rangelands of the Rocky Mountains; its eastern half consists of high-elevation prairie, and is referred to as the High Plains. Wyoming's climate is semi-arid in some parts and continental in others, making it drier and windier overall than other states, with greater temperature extremes. The federal government owns just under half of Wyoming's land; the state ranks sixth in the amount of land—and fifth in the proportion of its land—that is owned by the federal government. Its federal lands include two national parks (Grand Teton and Yellowstone), two national recreation areas, two national monuments, and several national forests, as well as historic sites, fish hatcheries, and wildlife refuges.

Indigenous peoples have inhabited the region for thousands of years. Part of the land that became Wyoming came under American sovereignty via the Louisiana Purchase, part via the Oregon Treaty, and, lastly, via the Mexican Cession. With the opening of the Oregon Trail, the Mormon Trail, and the California Trail, vast numbers of pioneers traveled through parts of the state that had once been traversed mainly by fur trappers, and this spurred the establishment of forts, such as Fort Laramie, that today serve as population centers. The Transcontinental Railroad supplanted the wagon trails in 1867 with a route through southern Wyoming, bringing new settlers and the establishment of founding towns, including the state capital of Cheyenne. On July 10, 1890, Wyoming became the union's 44th state.

Women's suffrage in Wyoming dates to 1869 when it granted women the right to vote as a territory, and in 1890 it became the first state allowing its woman citizens to vote. It also became the first state to allow women to hold elected office and the first to elect a female governor, Nellie Tayloe Ross. In honor of this part of its history, its official nickname is "The Equality State" and its official state motto is "Equal Rights".

Farming and ranching, and the attendant range wars, feature prominently in the state's history. Wyoming's economy is largely based on tourism and the extraction of minerals such as coal, natural gas, oil, and trona. Its agricultural commodities include barley, hay, livestock, sugar beets, wheat, and wool.

== Etymology ==
The name Wyoming originally denoted a valley in Pennsylvania. It was made famous by Thomas Campbell's poem "Gertrude of Wyoming" (1808), which dramatizes the Wyoming Massacre of 1778. As a name for the region that would become the state of Wyoming, it was put forward by Representative James Mitchell Ashley of Ohio in 1865. Ashley argued that the name was both "beautiful" and semantically fitting for a region on the edge of the Great Plains, since it means "at the big plains" in the Munsee Delaware language. When in 1868 a bill was introduced to organize this region as a territory, Congress considered the name Lincoln, but ultimately accepted Ashley's suggestion.

== History ==
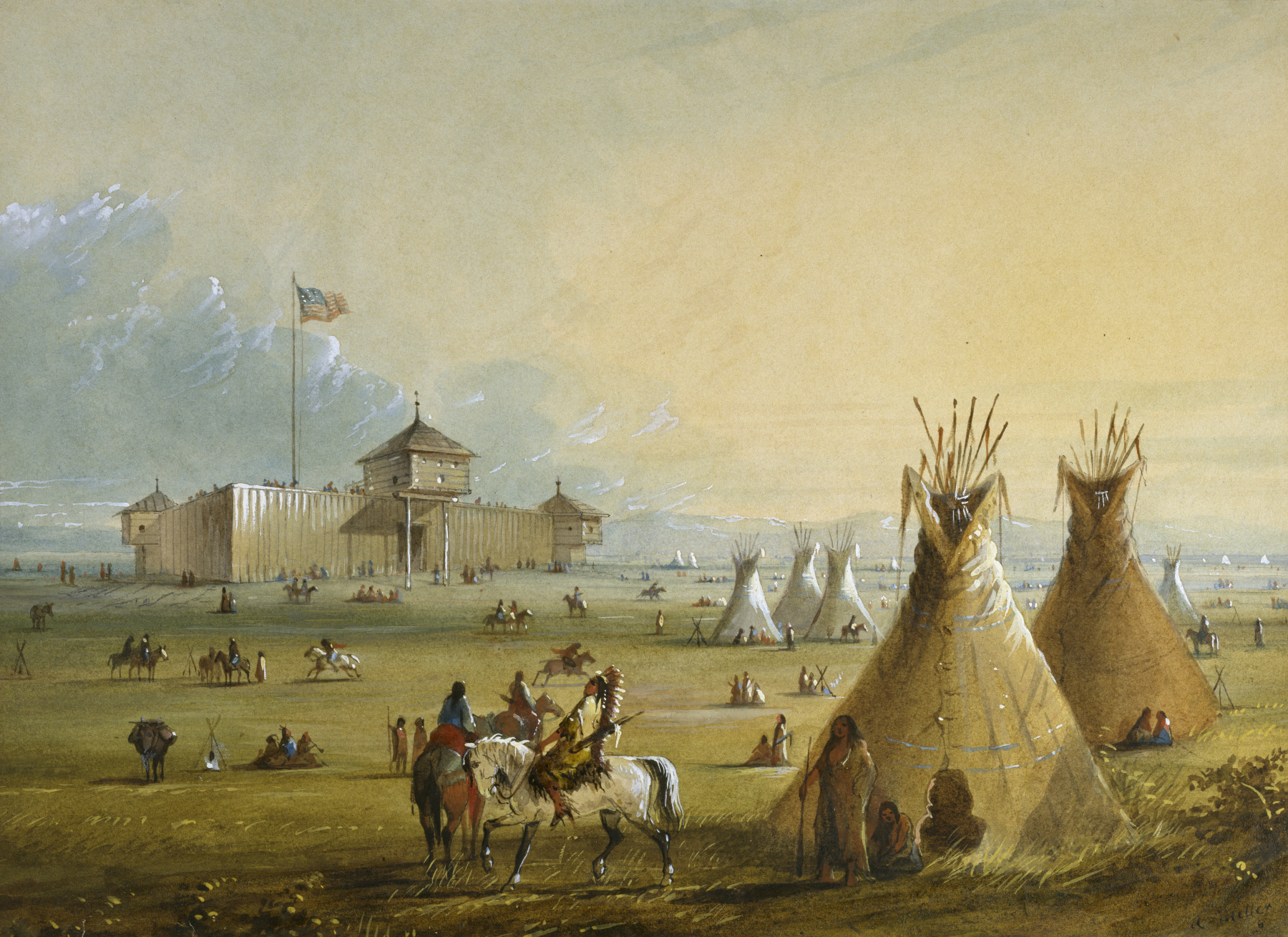
The first Fort Laramie as it looked before 1840 (painting from memory by Alfred Jacob Miller)

Several Native American groups originally inhabited the region today known as Wyoming. The Crow, Arapaho, Lakota, and Shoshone were but a few of the original inhabitants European explorers encountered when they first visited the region. What is now southwestern Wyoming was claimed by the Spanish Empire, which extended through the Southwest and Mexico. With Mexican independence in 1821, it was considered part of Alta California. U.S. expansion brought settlers who fought for control. Mexico ceded these territories after its defeat in 1848 in the Mexican–American War.

From the late 18th century, French-Canadian trappers from Québec and Montréal regularly entered the area for trade with the tribes. French toponyms such as Téton and La Ramie are marks of that history.

American John Colter first recorded a description in English of the region in 1807. He was a member of the Lewis and Clark Expedition, which was guided by French Canadian Toussaint Charbonneau and his young Shoshone wife, Sacagawea. At the time, Colter's reports of the Yellowstone area were considered fictional. On a return from Astoria, Robert Stuart and a party of five men discovered South Pass in 1812.

The Oregon Trail later followed that route as emigrants moved to the west coast. In 1850, mountain man Jim Bridger first documented what is now known as Bridger Pass. Bridger also explored Yellowstone, and filed reports on the region that, like Colter's, were largely regarded at the time as tall tales. The Union Pacific Railroad constructed track through Bridger Pass in 1868. It was used as the route for construction of Interstate 80 through the mountains 90 years later.

After the Union Pacific Railroad reached Cheyenne in 1867, population growth was stimulated. The federal government established the Wyoming Territory on July 25, 1868. Lacking significant deposits of gold and silver, unlike mineral-rich Colorado, Wyoming did not have such a population boom. But South Pass City had a short-lived boom after the Carissa Mine began producing gold in 1867. Copper was mined in some areas between the Sierra Madre Mountains and the Snowy Range near Grand Encampment.

Once government-sponsored expeditions to the Yellowstone country began, Colter's and Bridger's descriptions of the region's landscape were confirmed. In 1872, Yellowstone National Park was created as the world's first, to protect this area. Nearly all of the park lies within the northwestern corner of Wyoming.

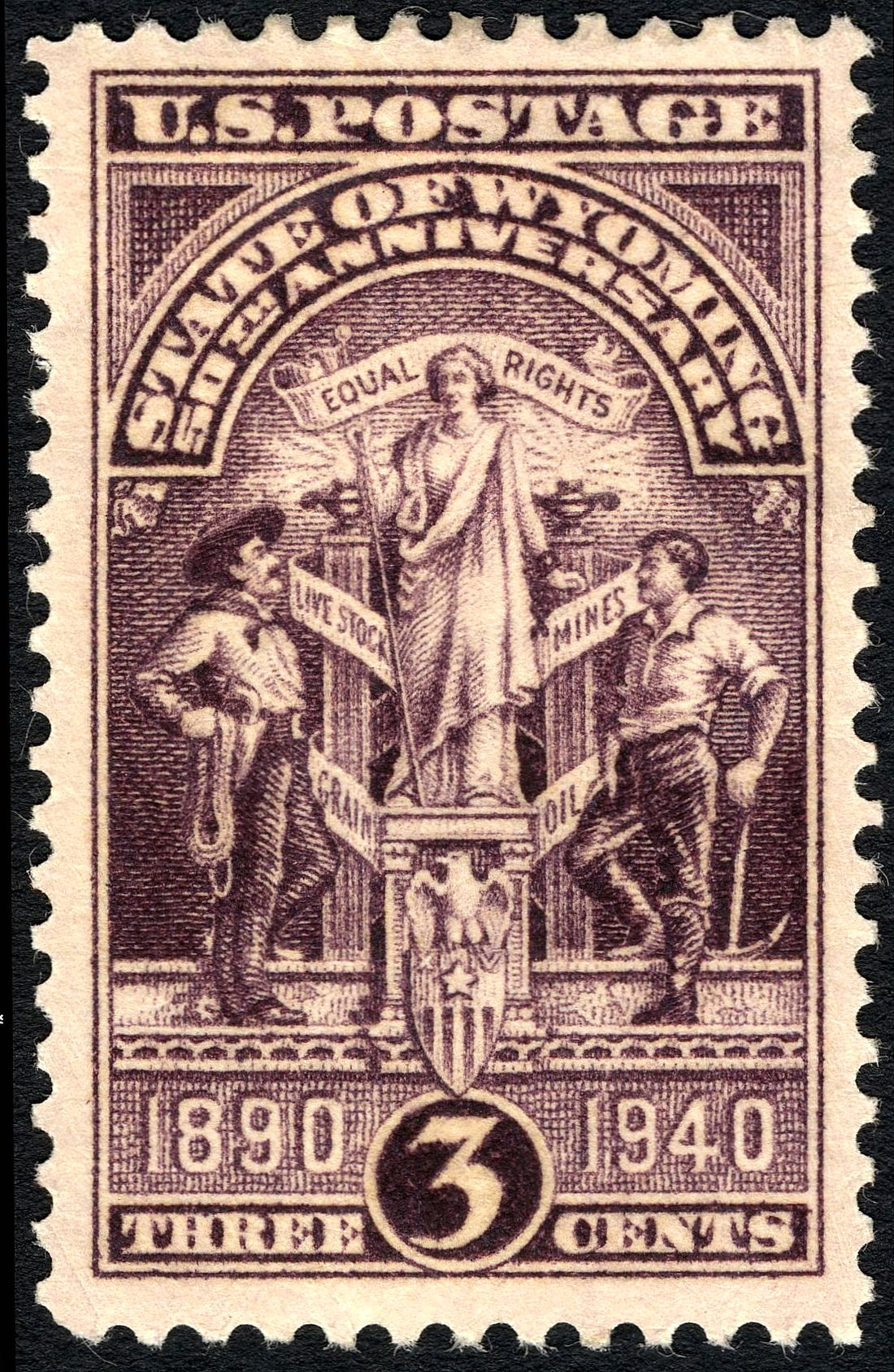
On July 10, 1940, the U.S. Post Office issued a postage stamp commemorating the 50th anniversary of Wyoming statehood. The engraving depicts the Wyoming state seal, which features a central figure of a woman in front of a banner reading 'equal rights'

On December 10, 1869, territorial Governor John Allen Campbell extended the right to vote to women, making Wyoming the first territory to do so, and upon statehood became the first state to grant women's suffrage. Women first served on juries in Wyoming (Laramie in 1870). Wyoming was also a pioneer in welcoming women into electoral politics. It had the first female court bailiff (Mary Atkinson, Laramie, in 1870), and the first female justice of the peace in the country (Esther Hobart Morris, South Pass City, in 1870). In 1924, Wyoming was the first state to elect a female governor, Nellie Tayloe Ross, who took office in January 1925. Due to its civil-rights history, one of Wyoming's state nicknames is "The Equality State", and the official state motto is "Equal Rights".

Wyoming's constitution also included a pioneering article on water rights. Bills for Wyoming Territory's admission to the union were introduced in both the U.S. Senate and U.S. House of Representatives in December 1889. On March 27, 1890, the House passed the bill and President Benjamin Harrison signed Wyoming's statehood bill; Wyoming became the 44th state in the union on July 10, 1890.

Wyoming was the location of the Johnson County War of 1892, which erupted between competing groups of cattle ranchers. The passage of the Homestead Act led to an influx of small ranchers. A range war broke out when either or both of the groups chose violent conflict over commercial competition in the use of the public land.

== Geography ==
=== Climate ===
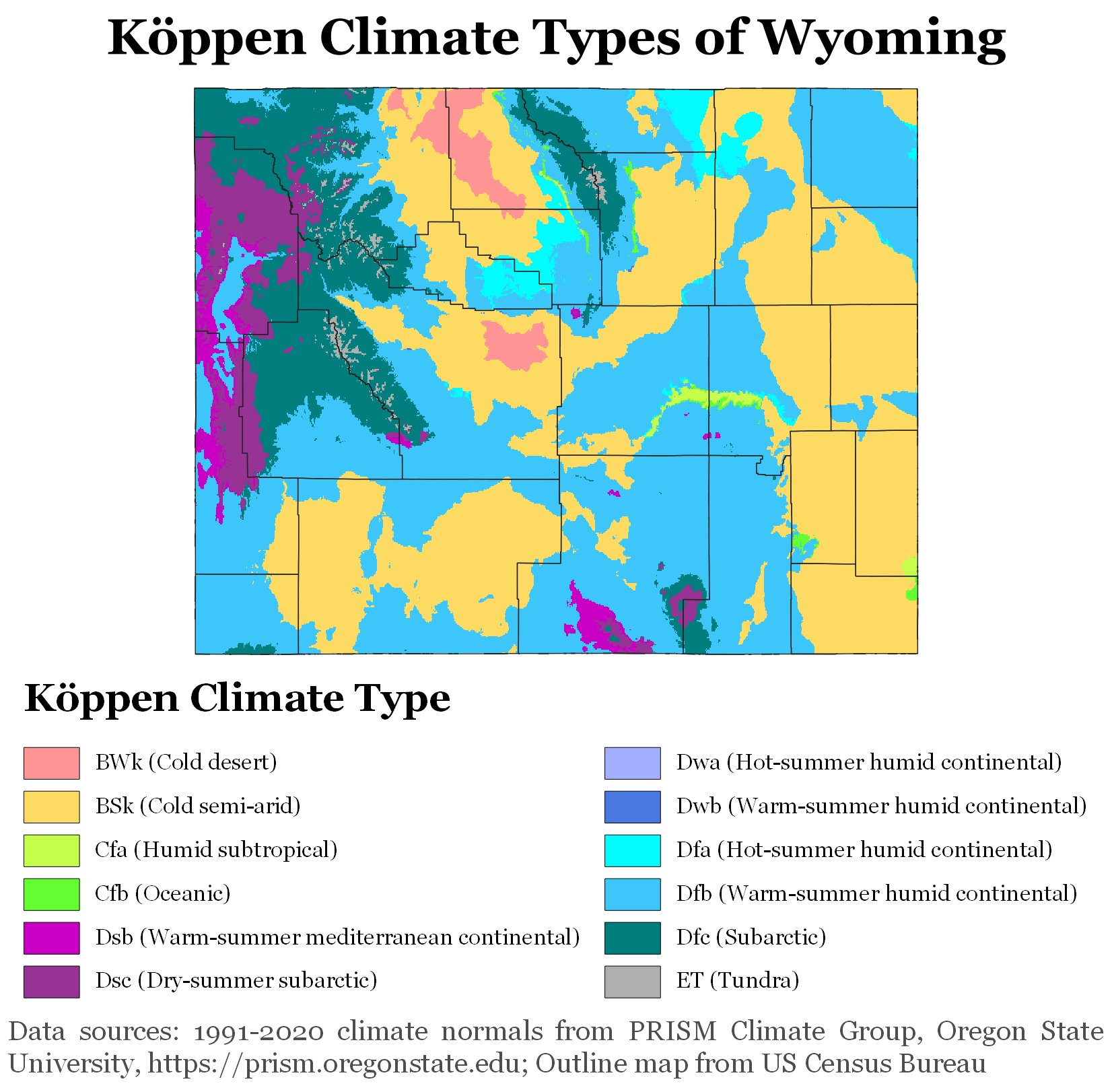
Köppen climate types of Wyoming, using 1991–2020 climate normals

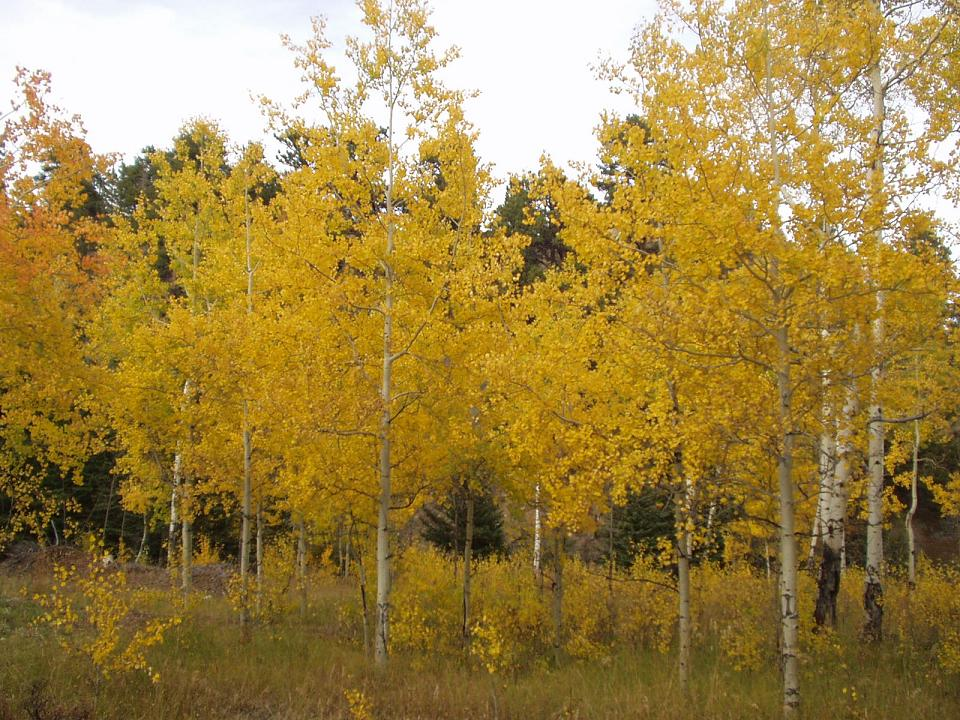
Autumn in the Bighorn Mountains

Wyoming's climate is generally semi-arid and continental (Köppen climate classification BSk) and is drier and windier in comparison to most of the United States with greater temperature extremes. Much of this is due to the topography of the state. Summers in Wyoming are warm with July high temperatures averaging between 80 and 90 °F (27 and 32 °C) in most of the state. With increasing elevation, however, this average drops rapidly with locations above 9,000 feet (2,700 m) averaging around 70 °F (21 °C). Summer nights throughout the state are characterized by a rapid cooldown with even the hottest locations averaging in the 50–60 °F (10–16 °C) range at night. In most of the state, most of the precipitation tends to fall in the late spring and early summer. Winters are cold but are variable with periods of sometimes extreme cold interspersed between generally mild periods, with Chinook winds providing unusually warm temperatures in some locations.

Wyoming is a dry state with much of the land receiving less than 10 inches (250 mm) of rainfall per year. Precipitation depends on elevation with lower areas in the Big Horn Basin averaging 5–8 inches (130–200 mm), making the area nearly a true desert. The lower areas in the North and on the eastern plains typically average around 10–12 inches (250–300 mm), making the climate there semi-arid. Some mountain areas do receive a good amount of precipitation, 20 inches (510 mm) or more, much of it as snow, sometimes 200 inches (510 cm) or more annually. The state's highest recorded temperature is 114 °F (46 °C) at Basin on July 12, 1900, and the lowest recorded temperature is −66 °F (−54 °C) at Riverside on February 9, 1933.

The number of thunderstorm days varies across the state with the southeastern plains of the state having the most days of thunderstorm activity. Thunderstorm activity in the state is highest during the late spring and early summer. The southeastern corner of the state is the most vulnerable part of the state to tornado activity. Moving away from that point and westwards, the incidence of tornadoes drops dramatically with the west part of the state showing little vulnerability. Tornadoes, where they occur, tend to be small and brief, unlike some of those that occur farther east.

Climate data for Casper, Wyoming (CPR), 1991–2020 normals, extremes 1939–present
Month	Jan	Feb	Mar	Apr	May	Jun	Jul	Aug	Sep	Oct	Nov	Dec	Year
Record high °F (°C)	60 (16)	68 (20)	83 (28)	84 (29)	95 (35)	102 (39)	104 (40)	103 (39)	100 (38)	87 (31)	73 (23)	66 (19)	104 (40)
Mean maximum °F (°C)	50.8 (10.4)	55.1 (12.8)	68.1 (20.1)	76.9 (24.9)	85.4 (29.7)	94.3 (34.6)	99.1 (37.3)	96.9 (36.1)	91.9 (33.3)	80.1 (26.7)	65.7 (18.7)	52.8 (11.6)	99.5 (37.5)
Mean daily maximum °F (°C)	35.2 (1.8)	37.8 (3.2)	48.8 (9.3)	56.3 (13.5)	66.8 (19.3)	79.6 (26.4)	89.0 (31.7)	86.7 (30.4)	75.6 (24.2)	59.7 (15.4)	45.9 (7.7)	34.7 (1.5)	59.7 (15.4)
Daily mean °F (°C)	25.1 (−3.8)	26.6 (−3.0)	35.8 (2.1)	42.3 (5.7)	52.0 (11.1)	62.5 (16.9)	71.0 (21.7)	69.0 (20.6)	58.9 (14.9)	45.3 (7.4)	34.0 (1.1)	24.8 (−4.0)	45.6 (7.6)
Mean daily minimum °F (°C)	15.0 (−9.4)	15.4 (−9.2)	22.7 (−5.2)	28.2 (−2.1)	37.1 (2.8)	45.4 (7.4)	53.0 (11.7)	51.4 (10.8)	42.2 (5.7)	30.9 (−0.6)	22.0 (−5.6)	14.8 (−9.6)	31.5 (−0.3)
Mean minimum °F (°C)	−12.2 (−24.6)	−10.0 (−23.3)	3.3 (−15.9)	13.8 (−10.1)	24.5 (−4.2)	37.4 (3.0)	42.9 (6.1)	40.0 (4.4)	29.1 (−1.6)	13.9 (−10.1)	−2.6 (−19.2)	−11.5 (−24.2)	−20.8 (−29.3)
Record low °F (°C)	−40 (−40)	−32 (−36)	−25 (−32)	−6 (−21)	16 (−9)	25 (−4)	30 (−1)	29 (−2)	15 (−9)	−9 (−23)	−27 (−33)	−42 (−41)	−42 (−41)
Average precipitation inches (mm)	0.49 (12)	0.56 (14)	0.84 (21)	1.41 (36)	2.21 (56)	1.34 (34)	1.19 (30)	0.79 (20)	0.95 (24)	1.19 (30)	0.64 (16)	0.61 (15)	12.22 (308)
Average snowfall inches (cm)	9.0 (23)	10.9 (28)	10.3 (26)	10.5 (27)	2.6 (6.6)	0.1 (0.25)	0.0 (0.0)	0.0 (0.0)	1.5 (3.8)	7.0 (18)	8.9 (23)	11.0 (28)	71.8 (183.65)
Average extreme snow depth inches (cm)	5.0 (13)	5.2 (13)	3.8 (9.7)	2.6 (6.6)	0.7 (1.8)	0.1 (0.25)	0.0 (0.0)	0.0 (0.0)	0.3 (0.76)	2.2 (5.6)	3.4 (8.6)	4.7 (12)	9.1 (23)
Average precipitation days (≥ 0.01 in)	6.0	6.9	8.0	10.3	11.0	8.5	6.8	5.8	6.8	7.6	6.2	7.0	90.9
Average snowy days (≥ 0.1 in)	6.1	7.5	6.8	6.0	1.6	0.0	0.0	0.0	0.5	3.8	5.6	7.6	45.5
Mean monthly sunshine hours	204.6	172.3	269.7	300.0	334.8	354.0	368.9	368.9	333.0	217.0	204.0	198.4	3,325.6
Mean daily sunshine hours	6.6	6.1	8.7	10	10.8	11.8	11.9	11.9	11.1	7	6.8	6.4	9.1
Mean daily daylight hours	9.5	10.6	12.0	13.4	14.7	15.3	15.0	13.9	12.5	11.0	9.7	9.1	12.2
Percentage possible sunshine	69	58	73	75	73	77	79	86	89	64	70	70	74
Average ultraviolet index	2	2	2	2	5	6	6	6	4	2	2	2	3
Source 1: NOAA, Weather Atlas (sun data)
Source 2: National Weather Service

Climate data for Jackson, Wyoming, 1991–2020 normals, extremes 1905–present
Month	Jan	Feb	Mar	Apr	May	Jun	Jul	Aug	Sep	Oct	Nov	Dec	Year
Record high °F (°C)	55 (13)	58 (14)	71 (22)	79 (26)	90 (32)	95 (35)	101 (38)	98 (37)	93 (34)	87 (31)	67 (19)	66 (19)	101 (38)
Mean maximum °F (°C)	43.6 (6.4)	46.5 (8.1)	56.3 (13.5)	67.9 (19.9)	76.8 (24.9)	83.7 (28.7)	89.9 (32.2)	88.2 (31.2)	83.3 (28.5)	74.0 (23.3)	55.7 (13.2)	44.7 (7.1)	90.0 (32.2)
Mean daily maximum °F (°C)	26.1 (−3.3)	30.4 (−0.9)	40.2 (4.6)	50.2 (10.1)	60.3 (15.7)	69.8 (21.0)	79.1 (26.2)	78.0 (25.6)	68.1 (20.1)	54.5 (12.5)	37.6 (3.1)	26.2 (−3.2)	51.7 (11.0)
Daily mean °F (°C)	16.2 (−8.8)	19.9 (−6.7)	29.2 (−1.6)	38.0 (3.3)	45.9 (7.7)	53.8 (12.1)	60.2 (15.7)	58.9 (14.9)	50.5 (10.3)	39.7 (4.3)	26.7 (−2.9)	16.5 (−8.6)	38.0 (3.3)
Mean daily minimum °F (°C)	6.3 (−14.3)	9.3 (−12.6)	18.2 (−7.7)	25.8 (−3.4)	31.5 (−0.3)	37.8 (3.2)	41.4 (5.2)	39.8 (4.3)	32.8 (0.4)	24.9 (−3.9)	15.8 (−9.0)	6.8 (−14.0)	24.2 (−4.3)
Mean minimum °F (°C)	−19.3 (−28.5)	−15.6 (−26.4)	−2.0 (−18.9)	12.8 (−10.7)	18.4 (−7.6)	27.6 (−2.4)	32.5 (0.3)	29.8 (−1.2)	20.7 (−6.3)	10.2 (−12.1)	−2.6 (−19.2)	−17.3 (−27.4)	−24.5 (−31.4)
Record low °F (°C)	−50 (−46)	−48 (−44)	−49 (−45)	−5 (−21)	5 (−15)	12 (−11)	24 (−4)	18 (−8)	5 (−15)	−9 (−23)	−27 (−33)	−52 (−47)	−52 (−47)
Average precipitation inches (mm)	1.45 (37)	1.43 (36)	1.33 (34)	1.46 (37)	1.83 (46)	1.61 (41)	1.10 (28)	1.14 (29)	1.59 (40)	1.57 (40)	1.37 (35)	1.76 (45)	17.64 (448)
Average snowfall inches (cm)	19.1 (49)	15.6 (40)	9.2 (23)	4.2 (11)	0.6 (1.5)	0.0 (0.0)	0.0 (0.0)	0.0 (0.0)	0.1 (0.25)	2.0 (5.1)	11.0 (28)	16.4 (42)	78.2 (199.85)
Average extreme snow depth inches (cm)	17.1 (43)	18.8 (48)	16.1 (41)	3.7 (9.4)	0.5 (1.3)	0.0 (0.0)	0.0 (0.0)	0.0 (0.0)	0.0 (0.0)	1.6 (4.1)	5.8 (15)	10.9 (28)	20.5 (52)
Average precipitation days (≥ 0.01 in)	12.3	10.1	8.8	9.3	11.0	9.7	7.3	7.6	8.0	8.7	9.5	13.6	115.9
Average snowy days (≥ 0.1 in)	10.8	9.1	5.5	2.4	0.4	0.0	0.0	0.0	0.1	1.7	5.4	11.4	46.8
Source 1: NOAA
Source 2: National Weather Service

=== Location and size ===
As specified in the designating legislation for the Territory of Wyoming, Wyoming's borders are lines of latitude 41°N and 45°N, and longitude 104°3'W and 111°3'W (27 and 34 west of the Washington Meridian) – a geographical quadrangle. Wyoming is one of only three states (the others being Colorado and Utah) to have borders defined by only "straight" lines. Due to surveying inaccuracies during the 19th century, Wyoming's legal border deviates from the true latitude and longitude lines by up to one-half mile (0.80 km) in some spots, especially in the mountainous region along the 45th parallel. Wyoming is bordered on the north by Montana, on the east by South Dakota and Nebraska, on the south by Colorado, on the southwest by Utah, and on the west by Idaho. It is the tenth largest state in the United States in total area, containing 97,814 square miles (253,340 km^{2}) and is made up of 23 counties. From the north border to the south border, it is 276 miles (444 km); and from the east to the west border is 365 miles (587 km) at its south end and 342 miles (550 km) at the north end.

=== Natural landforms ===
==== Mountain ranges ====
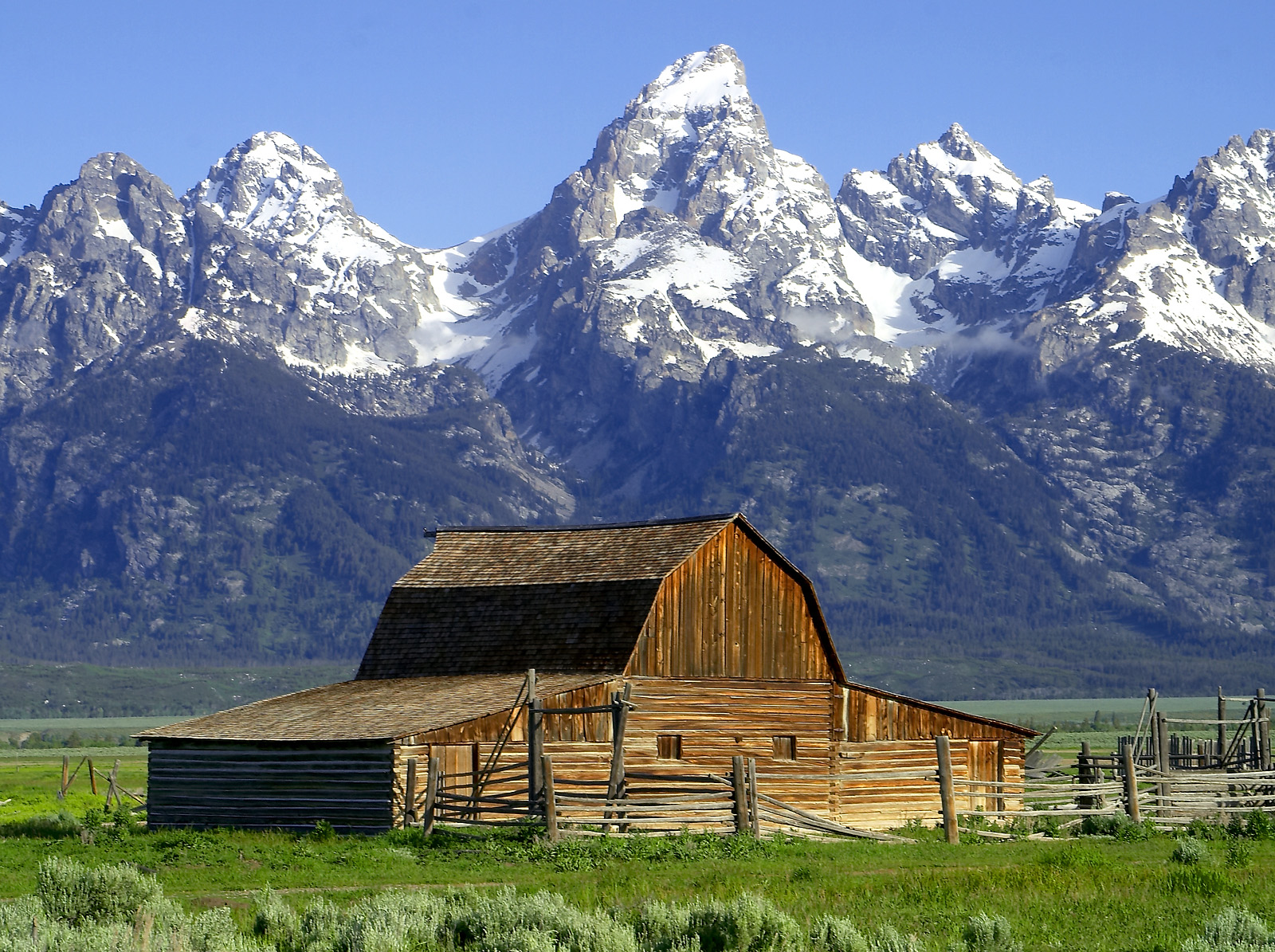
Teton Range

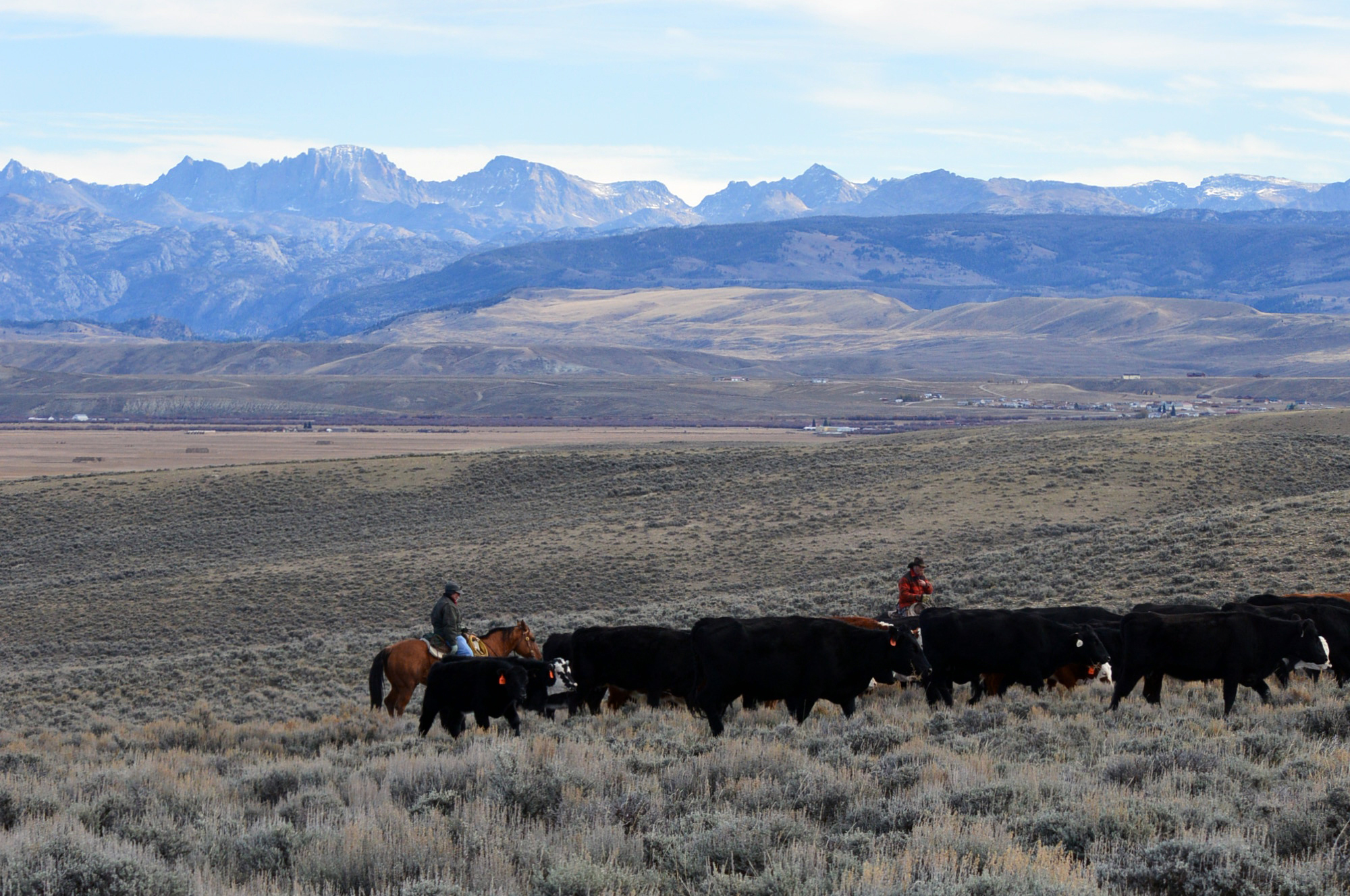
Green River valley

The Great Plains meet the Rocky Mountains in Wyoming. The state is a great plateau broken by many mountain ranges. Surface elevations range from the summit of Gannett Peak in the Wind River Mountain Range, at 13,804 feet (4,207 m), to the Belle Fourche River valley in the state's northeast corner, at 3,125 feet (952 m). In the northwest are the Absaroka, Owl Creek, Gros Ventre, Wind River, and the Teton ranges. In the north central are the Big Horn Mountains; in the northeast, the Black Hills; and in the southern region the Laramie, Snowy, and Sierra Madre ranges.

The Snowy Range in the south-central part of the state is an extension of the Colorado Rockies both in geology and in appearance. The Wind River Range in the west central part of the state is remote and includes more than 40 mountain peaks in excess of 13,000 ft (4,000 m) tall in addition to Gannett Peak, the highest peak in the state. The Bighorn Mountains in the north-central portion are somewhat isolated from the bulk of the Rocky Mountains.

The Teton Range in the northwest extends for 50 miles (80 km), part of which is included in Grand Teton National Park. The park includes the Grand Teton, the second-highest peak in the state.

The Continental Divide spans north–south across the central portion of the state. Rivers east of the divide drain into the Missouri River Basin and eventually the Gulf of Mexico. They are the North Platte, Wind, Bighorn, and Yellowstone rivers. The Snake River in northwest Wyoming eventually drains into the Columbia River and the Pacific Ocean, as does the Green River through the Colorado River Basin.

The Continental Divide forks in the south-central part of the state in an area known as the Great Divide Basin where water that precipitates onto or flows into it cannot reach an ocean—it all sinks into the soil and eventually evaporates.

Several rivers begin in or flow through the state, including the Yellowstone River, Bighorn River, Green River, and the Snake River.

==== Basins ====
Much of Wyoming is covered with large basins containing different eco-regions, from shrublands to smaller patches of desert. Regions of the state classified as basins contain everything from large geologic formations to sand dunes and vast unpopulated spaces. Basin landscapes are typically at lower elevations and include rolling hills, valleys, mesas, terraces and other rugged terrain, but also include natural springs as well as rivers and artificial reservoirs. They have common plant species such as various subspecies of sagebrush, juniper and grasses such as wheatgrass, but basins are known for their diversity of plant and animal species.

==== Islands ====
Wyoming has 32 named islands; the majority are in Jackson Lake and Yellowstone Lake, within Yellowstone National Park in the northwest portion of the state. The Green River in the southwest also contains a number of islands.

=== Regions and administrative divisions ===
==== Counties ====
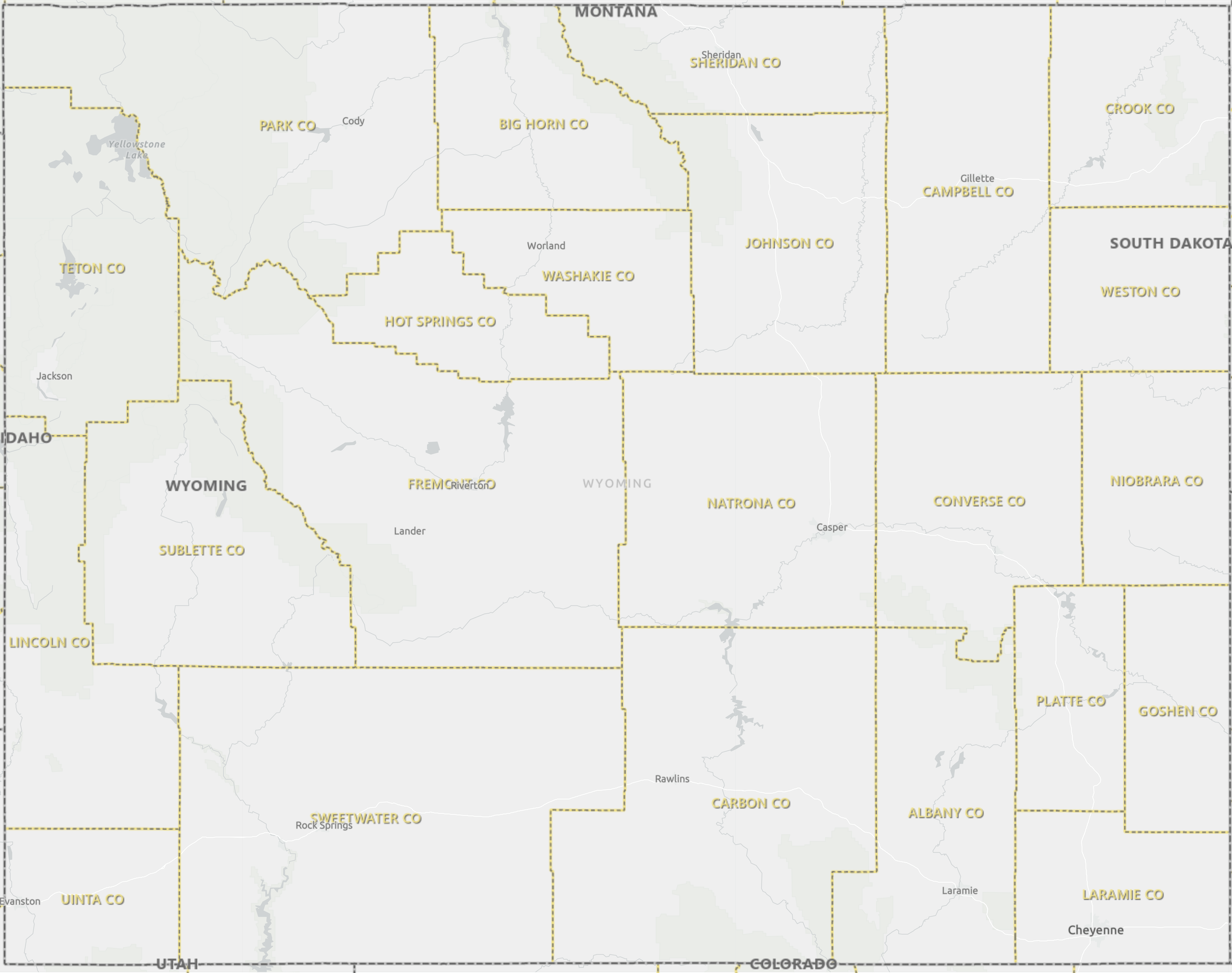
Map of Wyoming county boundaries

The state of Wyoming has 23 counties.

The 23 counties of the state of Wyoming (Note: 2020 Census population)
Rank	County	Population	Rank	County	Population
1	Laramie	100,512	13	Converse	13,751
2	Natrona	79,955	14	Goshen	12,498
3	Campbell	47,026	15	Big Horn	11,521
4	Sweetwater	42,272	16	Sublette	8,728
5	Fremont	39,234	17	Platte	8,605
6	Albany	37,066	18	Johnson	8,447
7	Sheridan	30,921	19	Washakie	7,685
8	Park	29,624	20	Crook	7,181
9	Teton	23,331	21	Weston	6,838
10	Uinta	20,450	22	Hot Springs	4,621
11	Lincoln	19,581	23	Niobrara	2,467
12	Carbon	14,537	Wyoming Total		576,851

Wyoming license plates have a number on the left that indicates the county where the vehicle is registered, ranked by an earlier census. Specifically, the numbers are representative of the property values of the counties in 1930. The county license plate numbers are:

License Plate Prefix	County	License Plate Prefix	County	License Plate Prefix	County
1	Natrona	9	Big Horn	17	Campbell
2	Laramie	10	Fremont	18	Crook
3	Sheridan	11	Park	19	Uinta
4	Sweetwater	12	Lincoln	20	Washakie
5	Albany	13	Converse	21	Weston
6	Carbon	14	Niobrara	22	Teton
7	Goshen	15	Hot Springs	23	Sublette
8	Platte	16	Johnson		

==== Cities and towns ====
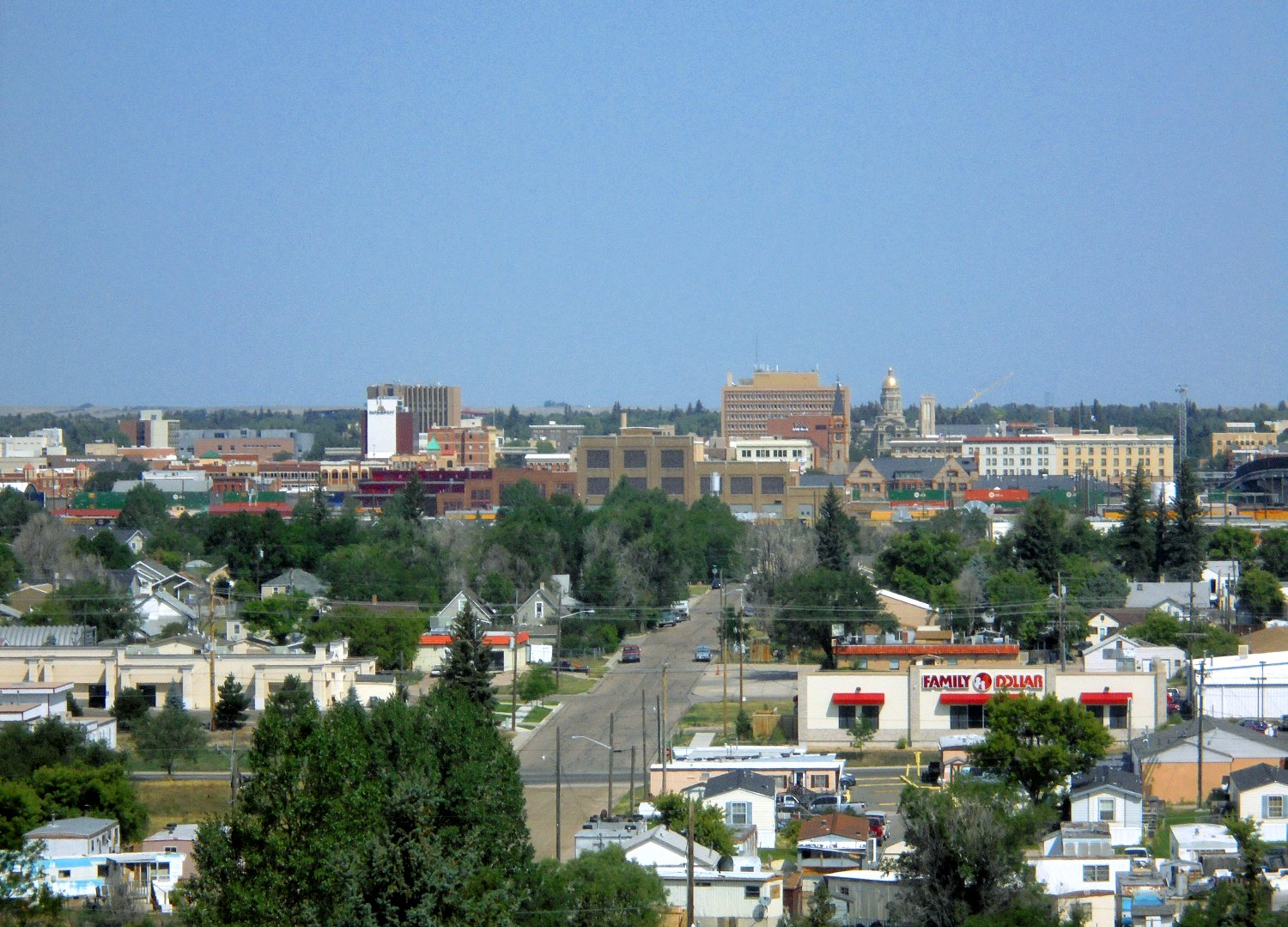
Cheyenne, Wyoming

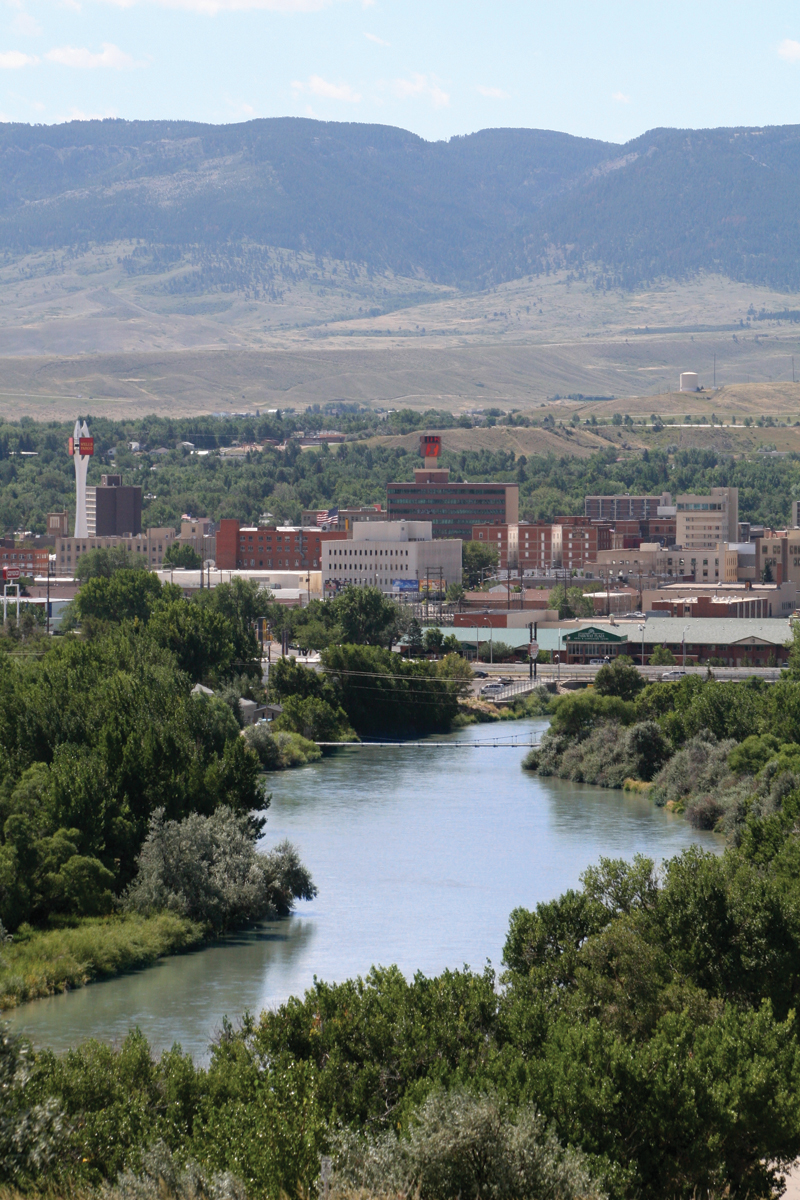
Casper, Wyoming

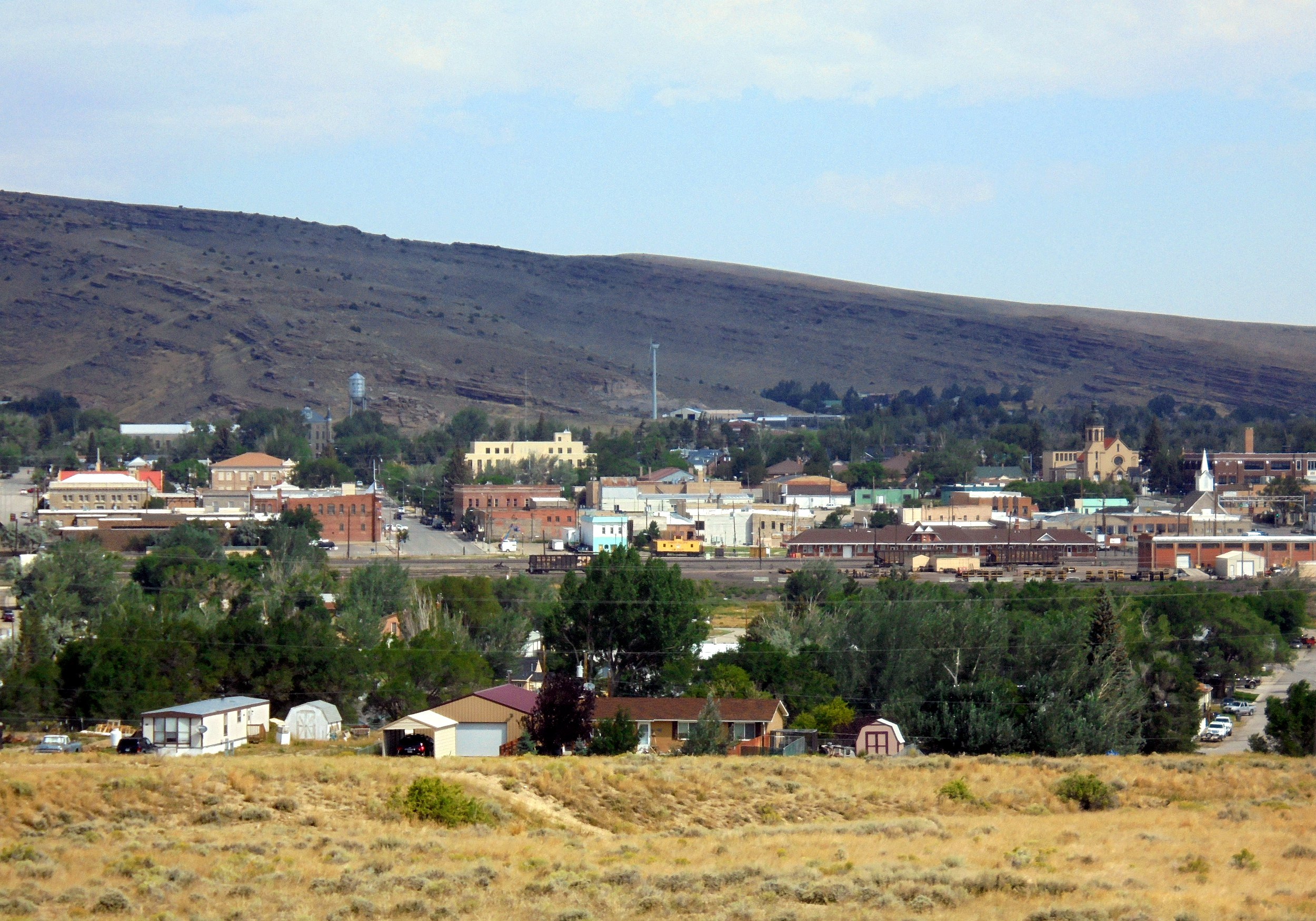
Rawlins, Wyoming

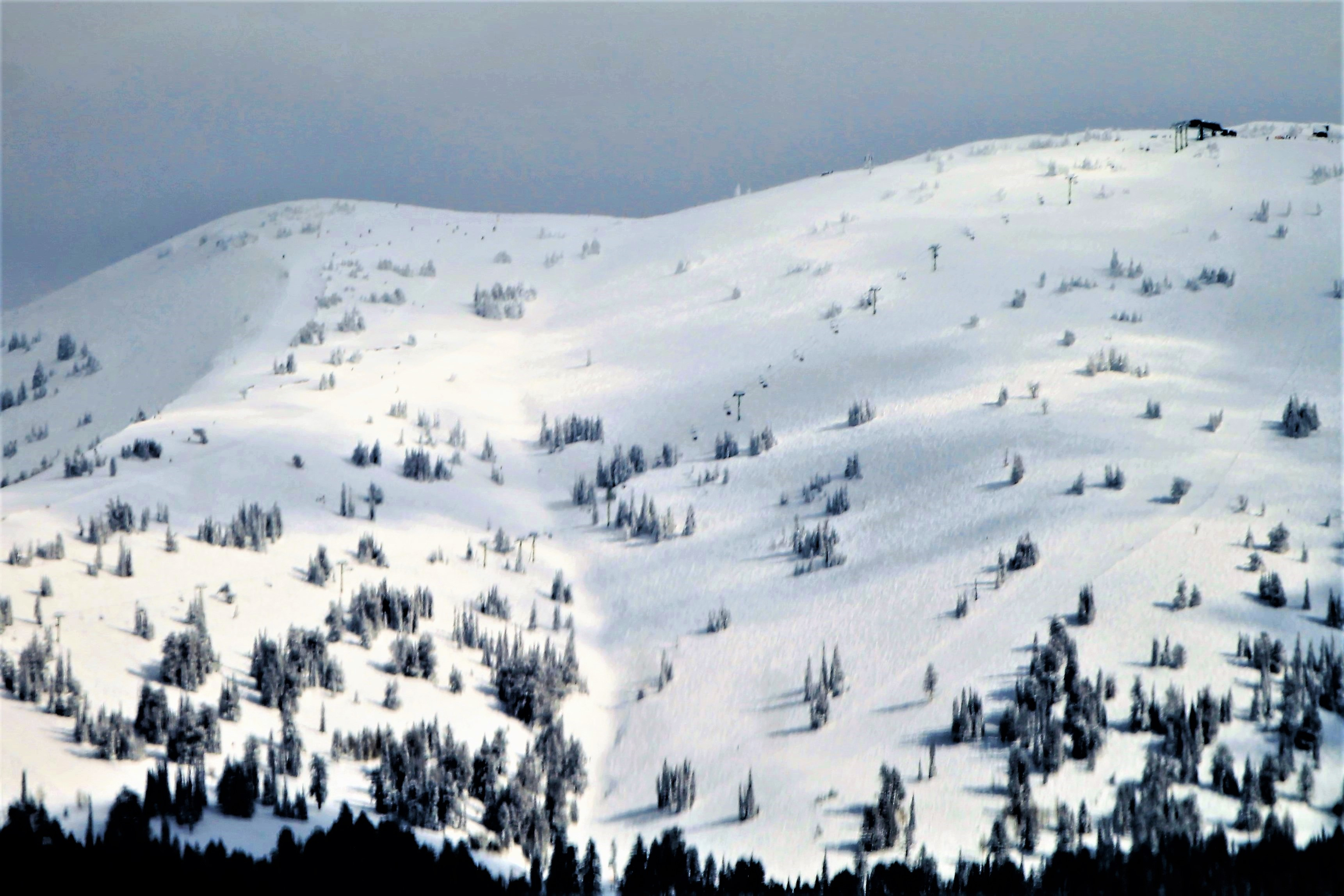
Wyoming is home to 12 ski resorts, including Grand Targhee and Jackson Hole.

The State of Wyoming has 99 incorporated municipalities.

Most populous Wyoming cities and towns
Rank	City	County	Population
1	Cheyenne	Laramie	65,132
2	Casper	Natrona	59,038
3	Gillette	Campbell	33,403
4	Laramie	Albany	31,407
5	Rock Springs	Sweetwater	23,526
6	Sheridan	Sheridan	18,737
7	Green River	Sweetwater	11,825
8	Evanston	Uinta	11,747
9	Jackson	Teton	10,760
10	Riverton	Fremont	10,682
11	Cody	Park	10,028
12	Rawlins	Carbon	8,221
13	Lander	Fremont	7,546
14	Powell	Park	6,419
15	Douglas	Converse	6,386
16	Torrington	Goshen	6,119

In 2020, 51.1% of Wyomingites lived in one of the 12 most populous Wyoming municipalities.

==== Metropolitan areas ====
The United States Census Bureau has defined two metropolitan statistical areas (MSA) and eight micropolitan statistical areas (MiSA) for the state. In 2020, 31.3% of Wyomingites lived in either of the metropolitan statistical areas, and 80.4% lived in either a metropolitan or a micropolitan area.

Metropolitan and micropolitan statistical areas
Census Area	County	Population
Cheyenne	Laramie	100,512
Casper	Natrona	79,955
Gillette	Campbell	47,026
Rock Springs	Sweetwater	42,272
Riverton	Fremont	39,234
Laramie	Albany	37,066
Jackson	Teton County, Wyoming	23,331
Jackson	Teton County, Idaho	11,630
Jackson	Total	34,961
Sheridan	Sheridan	30,233
Cody	Park	29,624
Evanston	Uinta County, Wyoming	20,450
Evanston	Rich County, Utah	2,510
Evanston	Total	22,960

== Demographics ==
Historical population
Census	Pop.	Note	%±
1870	9,118		—
1880	20,789		128.0%
1890	62,555		200.9%
1900	92,531		47.9%
1910	145,965		57.7%
1920	194,402		33.2%
1930	225,565		16.0%
1940	250,742		11.2%
1950	290,529		15.9%
1960	330,066		13.6%
1970	332,416		0.7%
1980	469,557		41.3%
1990	453,588		−3.4%
2000	493,782		8.9%
2010	563,626		14.1%
2020	576,851		2.3%
2025 (est.)	588,753		2.1%
Sources: 1910–2020

=== Population ===
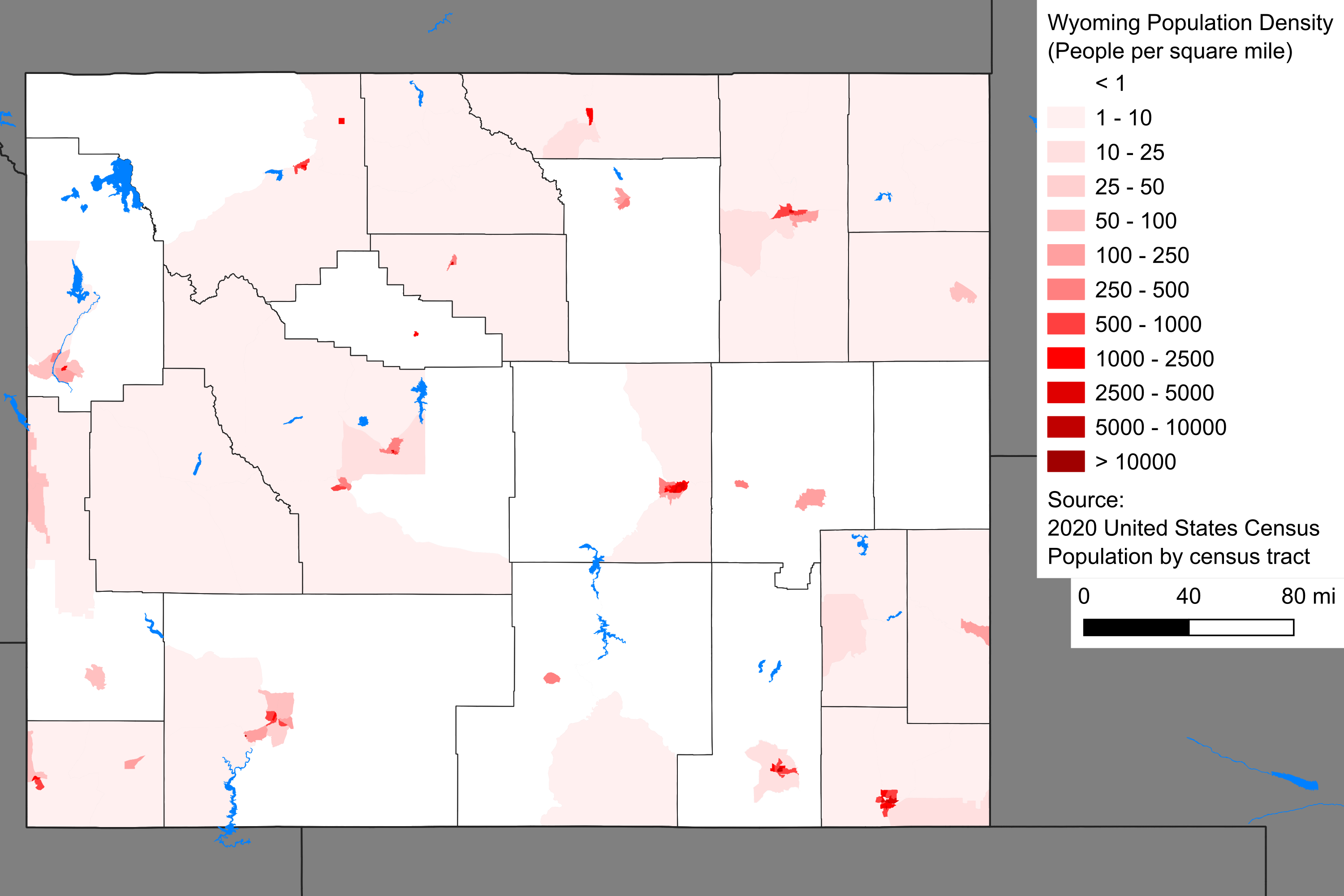
The largest population centers are Cheyenne (southeast) and Casper.

The 2020 United States census counted 576,851 people living in Wyoming. The center of population of Wyoming is in Natrona County. Sparsely populated, Wyoming is the least populous state of the United States. Wyoming has the second-lowest population density in the country (behind Alaska) and is the sparsest-populated of the 48 contiguous states. It is one of only two states with a population smaller than that of the nation's capital; the only other state with this distinction is Vermont.

According to HUD's 2022 Annual Homeless Assessment Report, there were an estimated 648 homeless people in Wyoming.

According to the 2020 census, the population's racial composition was 84.7% white (81.4% non-Hispanic white), 2.4% American Indian and Alaska Native, 0.9% Black or African American, 0.9% Asian American, and 0.1% Native Hawaiian or Pacific Islander, 3.5% from some other race, and 7.5% from two or more races. As of 2011, 24.9% of Wyoming's population younger than age 1 were minorities. According to data from the American Community Survey, as of 2018, Wyoming was the only U.S. state where African Americans earn a higher median income than white workers.

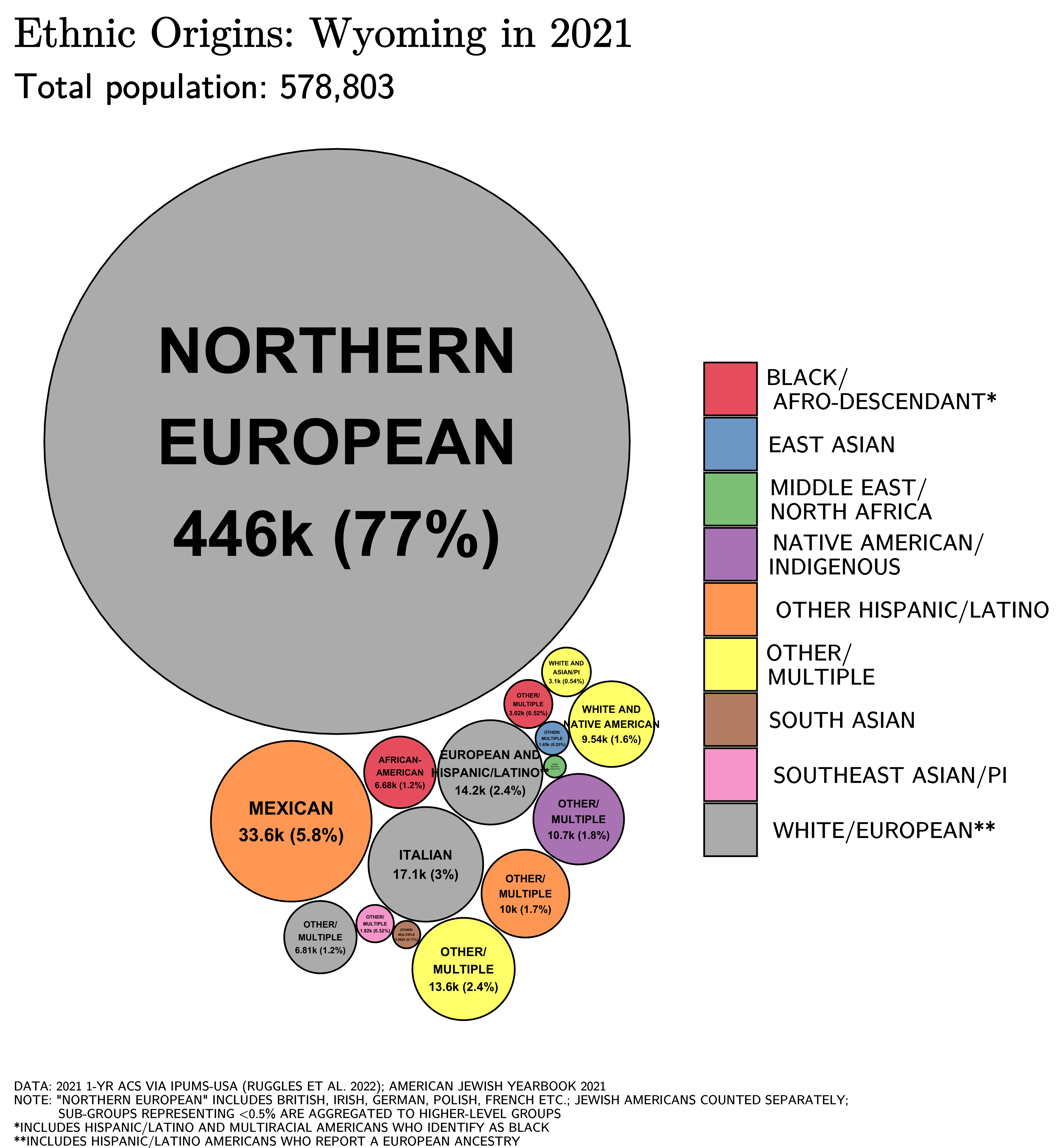
Ethnic origins in Wyoming Largest alone or in any combination ethnic origin by county in Wyoming, per the 2020 census

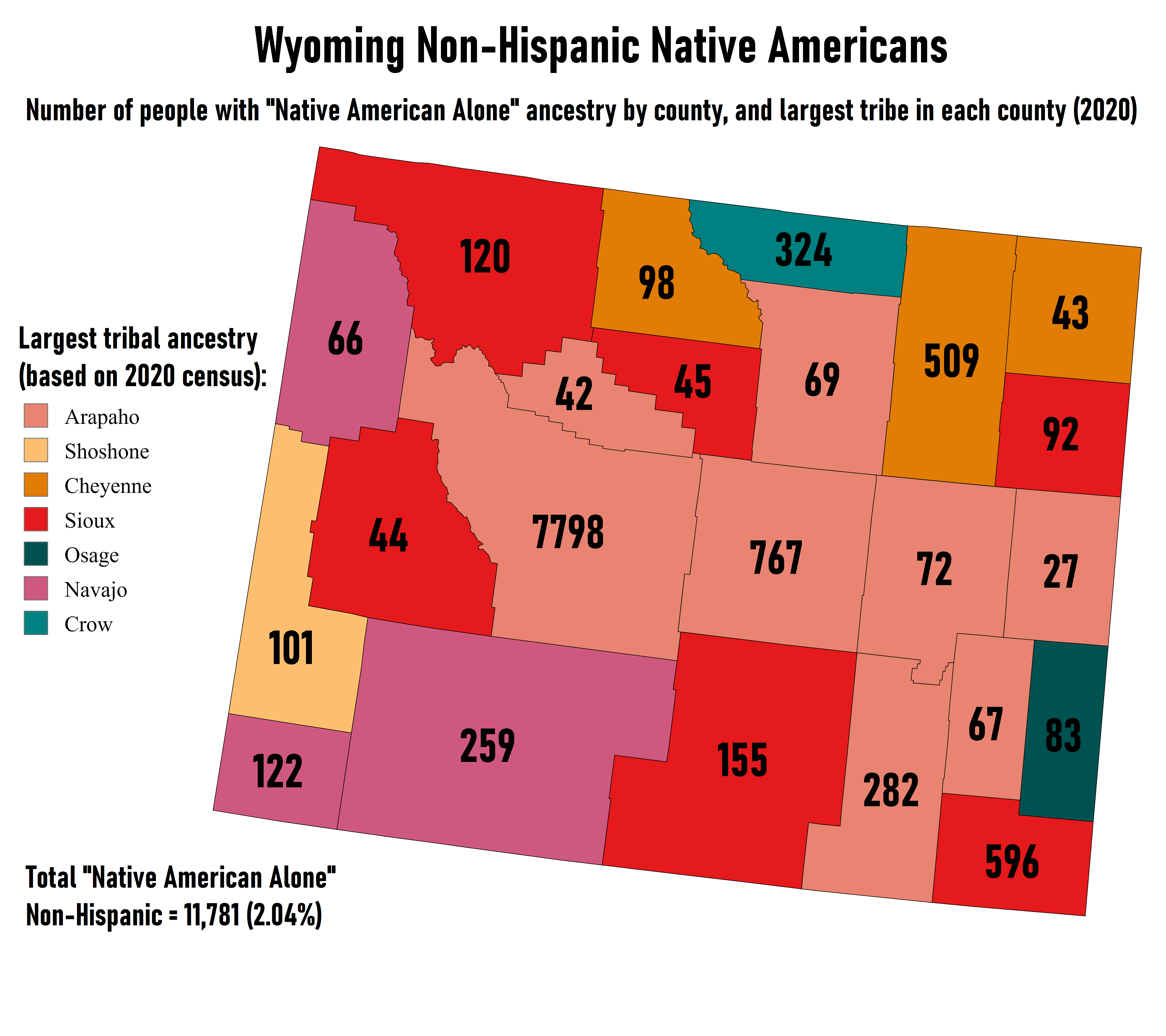
Largest Non-Hispanic Native American ancestry by county and numbers of people reporting "Native American Alone"

As of 2015, Wyoming had an estimated population of 586,107, which was an increase of 1,954, or 0.29%, from the prior year and an increase of 22,481, or 3.99%, since the 2010 census. This includes a natural increase since the last census of 12,165 (33,704 births minus 21,539 deaths) and an increase from net migration of 4,035 into the state. Immigration resulted in a net increase of 2,264 and migration within the country produced a net increase of 1,771. In 2004, the foreign-born population was 11,000 (2.2%). In 2005, total births in Wyoming were 7,231 (birth rate of 14.04 per thousand).

Wyoming experienced its first population decline since 1990, with a decrease of just over 1,000 people (0.2 percent) from July 2015 to July 2016. This decline was attributed to the downturn in the state's mineral extraction industry, particularly the oil and gas sector, which led to the loss of thousands of jobs. However, state economist Jim Robinson noted signs of economic stabilization. Job losses in the oil and gas industry appeared to have leveled off, and there was a slight increase in drilling activity in recent months. While the state's economy showed little growth, it was considered to have reached a more stable condition as of late 2016.

According to the 2000 census, the largest ancestry groups in Wyoming were: German (25.9%), English (15.9%), Irish (13.3%), and American Indian (4.7%). An additional 6.4% responded with "American" as their ancestry.

In 2018, the top countries of origin for Wyoming's immigrants were Mexico, China, Germany, England and Canada.

Birth data

Map of counties in Wyoming by racial plurality, per the 2020 U.S. census Legend: Non-Hispanic White 60–70% 70–80% 80–90% 90%+

Note: Births in table do not add up, because Hispanics are counted both by their ethnicity and by their race, giving a higher overall number.

Live Births by Single Race/Ethnicity of Mother
Race	2014	2015	2016	2017	2018	2019	2020	2021	2022	2023	2024
White	6,258 (81.3%)	6,196 (79.8%)	5,763 (78.0%)	5,426 (78.6%)	5,078 (77.4%)	5,158 (78.6%)	4,762 (77.7%)	4,882 (78.3%)	4,622 (76.4%)	4,553 (76.0%)	4,587 (75.3%)
Native American	294 (3.8%)	294 (3.8%)	200 (2.7%)	206 (3.0%)	219 (3.3%)	198 (3.0%)	176 (2.9%)	179 (2.9%)	178 (2.9%)	150 (2.5%)	156 (2.5%)
Asian	108 (1.4%)	135 (1.7%)	100 (1.3%)	79 (1.1%)	72 (1.1%)	73 (1.1%)	58 (0.9%)	67 (1.1%)	64 (1.1%)	68 (1.1%)	65 (1.0%)
Black	116 (1.5%)	119 (1.5%)	63 (0.9%)	45 (0.7%)	57 (0.9%)	61 (0.9%)	55 (0.9%)	48 (0.8%)	46 (0.7%)	38 (0.6%)	42 (0.7%)
Hispanic (any race)	895 (11.6%)	963 (12.4%)	973 (13.2%)	892 (12.9%)	851 (13.0%)	839 (12.8%)	818 (13.3%)	749 (12.0%)	835 (13.8%)	858 (14.3%)	929 (15.2%)
Total	7,696 (100%)	7,765 (100%)	7,386 (100%)	6,903 (100%)	6,562 (100%)	6,565 (100%)	6,128 (100%)	6,237 (100%)	6,049 (100%)	5,990 (100%)	6,089 (100%)

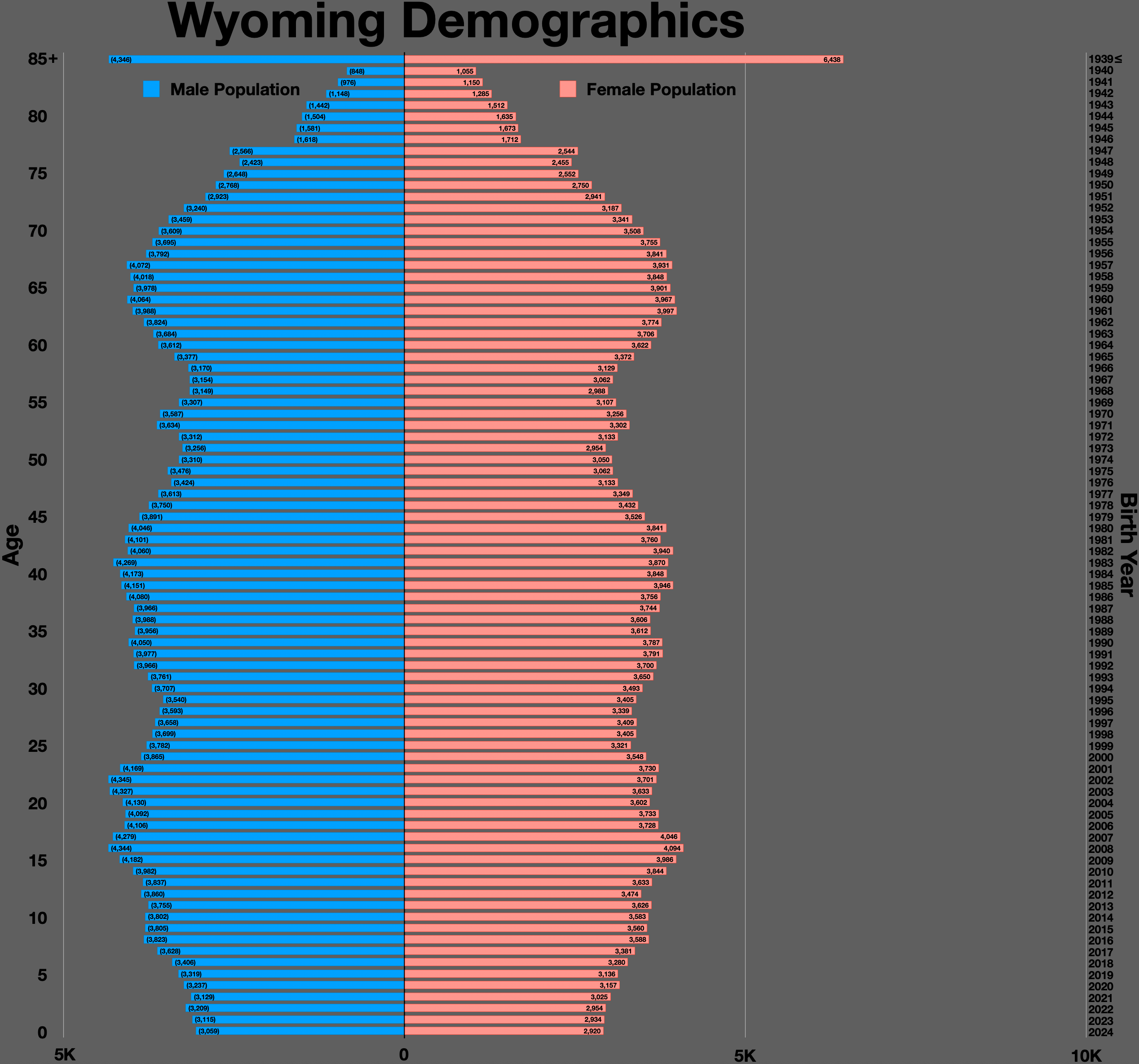
Wyoming population pyramid

- Since 2016, data for births of White Hispanic origin are not collected, but included in one Hispanic group; persons of Hispanic origin may be of any race.

=== Languages ===
In 2010, 93.39% (474,343) of Wyomingites over age 5 spoke English as their primary language; 4.47% (22,722) spoke Spanish, 0.35% (1,771) spoke German, and 0.28% (1,434) spoke French. Other common non-English languages included Algonquian (0.18%), Russian (0.10%), Tagalog, and Greek (both 0.09%).

In 2007, the American Community Survey reported 6.2% (30,419) of Wyoming's population over five spoke a language other than English at home. Of those, 68.1% were able to speak English very well, 16.0% spoke English well, 10.9% did not speak English well, and 5.0% did not speak English at all.

=== Religion ===
Religious self-identification, Public Religion Research Institute's 2020 American Values Atlas survey.
1. Unaffiliated (40.0%)
2. Protestantism (33.0%)
3. Catholicism (15.0%)
4. Mormonism (7.00%)
5. Judaism (1.00%)
6. Other (4.00%)

In 2020, the Public Religion Research Institute determined that about 55% of Wyoming's adult population was Christian, primarily evangelical and mainline Protestant, Roman Catholic, and Mormon. The Public Religion Research Institute survey documented a decrease in religiosity from a 2014 separate Pew Research Center study; according to the Public Religion Research Institute, the unaffiliated made up 40% of the state population by 2020. According to a 2013 Gallup poll, Wyomingites' religious affiliations were 49% Protestant, 23% nonreligious or other, 18% Catholic, 9% Latter-day Saint (Mormons), and less than 1% Jewish.

A 2010 Association of Religion Data Archives (ARDA) report recognized as Wyoming's largest denominations the Church of Jesus Christ of Latter-day Saints (LDS Church), with 62,804 (11%); the Catholic Church, with 61,222 (10.8%); and the Southern Baptist Convention, with 15,812 (2.8%). The report counted 59,247 evangelical Protestants (10.5%), 36,539 mainline Protestants (6.5%), 785 Eastern Orthodox Christians; 281 Black Protestants; 65,000 adhering to other traditions; and 340,552 claiming no religious tradition. In 2020, ARDA reported the state's largest individual denominations as the following: the Catholic Church (69,500); the LDS Church (67,729); and the Southern Baptist Convention (11,082). Non-denominational Protestants were 23,410 in number.

According to ARDA's 2020 report, the Roman Catholics had an adherence rate of 120.48 per 1,000 people, Mormons 117.41 per 1,000 people, and Southern Baptists 19.21 per 1,000 people. Non-denominational Protestants had an adherence rate of 40.58 per 1,000 people; these trends reflected the separate 2014 Pew study's varying attendance at religious services. In 2014, 38% visited a religious service at least once a week, 28% once or twice a month, and 32% seldom/never. A 2018 research article by the National Christian Foundation cited non-churchgoing Christians nationwide did not attend religious services often through practicing the faith in other ways, not finding a house of worship they liked, disliking sermons and feeling unwelcomed, and logistics.

== Economy and infrastructure ==
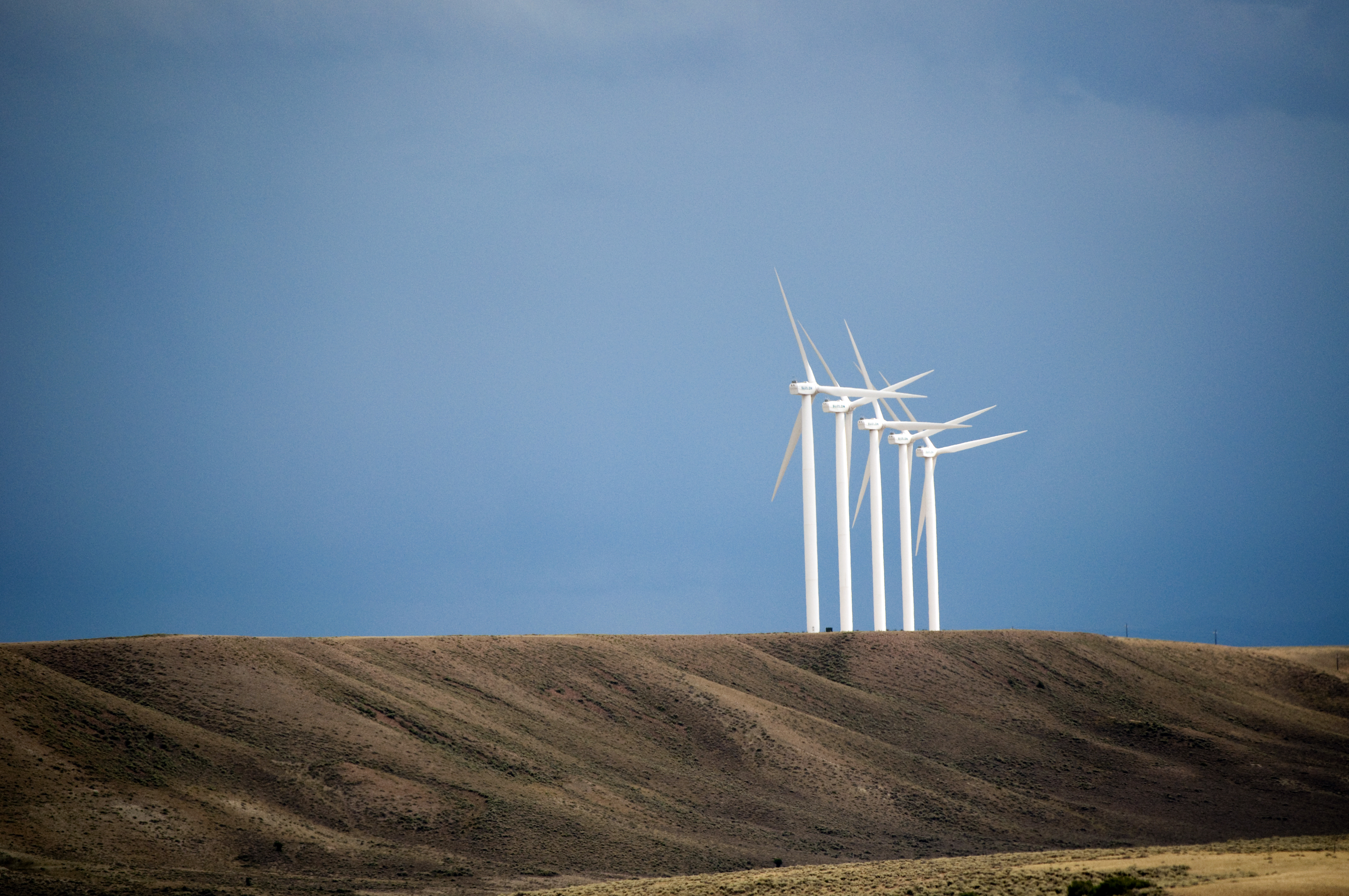
Wind farm in Uinta County

According to the Bureau of Economic Analysis, in 2025, Wyoming's gross state product was $52.6 billion and the state's per capita personal income was $89,806. As of 2014, the population was growing slightly with the most growth in tourist-oriented areas, such as Teton County. Boom conditions in neighboring states, such as North Dakota, were drawing energy workers away. About half of Wyoming's counties showed population loss. The state makes active efforts through Wyoming Grown, an internet-based recruitment program, to find jobs for young people educated in Wyoming who have emigrated but may wish to return. As of May 2025, the state's unemployment rate was 3.3%.

In 2025, Wyoming experienced its highest growth in new business formations, up 35% from 2024 with 227,723 new businesses formed, according to Business Observer. That same year, small businesses made up 98.9% of businesses in the state, and employed 65.2% of its work force.

The mineral-extraction industry and travel and tourism sector are the main drivers of Wyoming's economy. The federal government owns about 42.3% of its landmass, while the state controls 6%. The total taxable value of mining production in Wyoming in 2007 was over $14.5 billion. In 2018, the tourism industry contributed approximately $3.8 billion in spending from domestic and international visitors.

In 2002, more than six million people visited Wyoming's national parks and monuments. Wyoming's main tourist attractions include Grand Teton National Park, Yellowstone National Park, Devils Tower National Monument, Independence Rock and Fossil Butte National Monument. Yellowstone, established in 1872 as the world's first national park, attracts over three million visitors each year.

Historically, agriculture has been an important component of Wyoming's economy. Its overall importance to the economy has waned, but it is still an essential part of Wyoming's culture and lifestyle. The main agricultural commodities Wyoming produces include livestock (beef), hay, sugar beets, grain (wheat and barley), and wool. More than 91% of Wyoming's land is classified as rural.

Wyoming is the home of only a handful of companies with a regional or national presence. Taco John's and Sierra Trading Post, both in Cheyenne, are privately held. Cloud Peak Energy in Gillette and U.S. Energy Corp. (NASDAQ: USEG) in Riverton are Wyoming's only publicly traded companies.

Various initiatives have been put in place and legislation adopted to encourage the use of blockchain technology and cryptocurrencies in the state. Tyler Lindholm, a former state legislator, claimed that 500 member-owned limited liability companies built on blockchain had been established and that 17,000 businesses with "crypto" in their name were registered by 2023. State legislators appointed a commission in 2023 to create a stablecoin, aiming to be the first cryptocurrency created by a U.S. state. It launched in August 2025.

=== Mineral and energy production ===
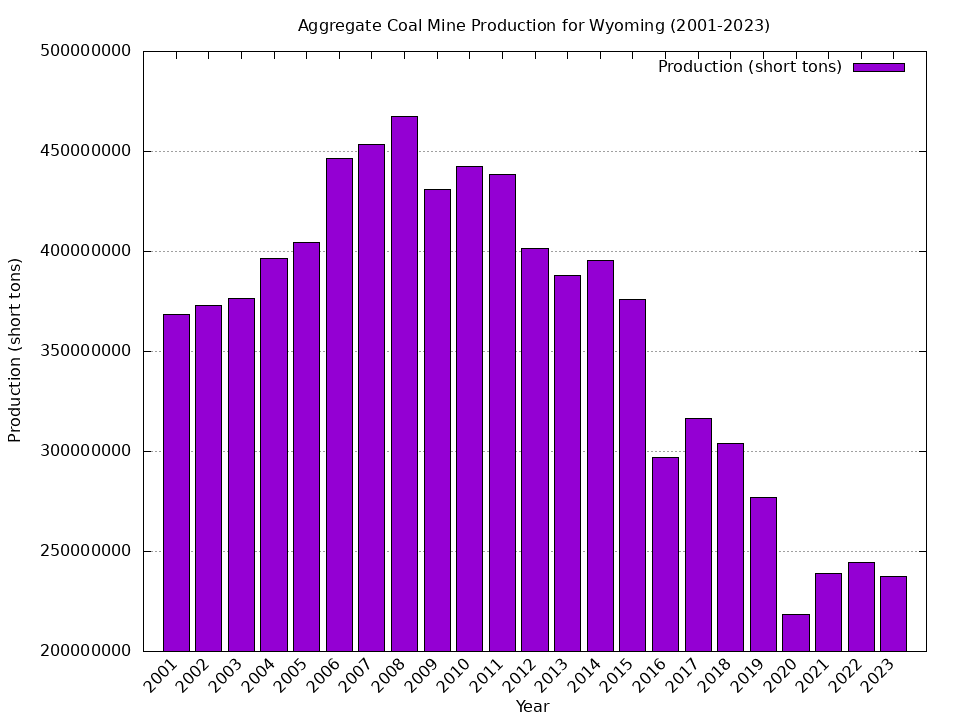
Wyoming coal production from 2001 to 2023.

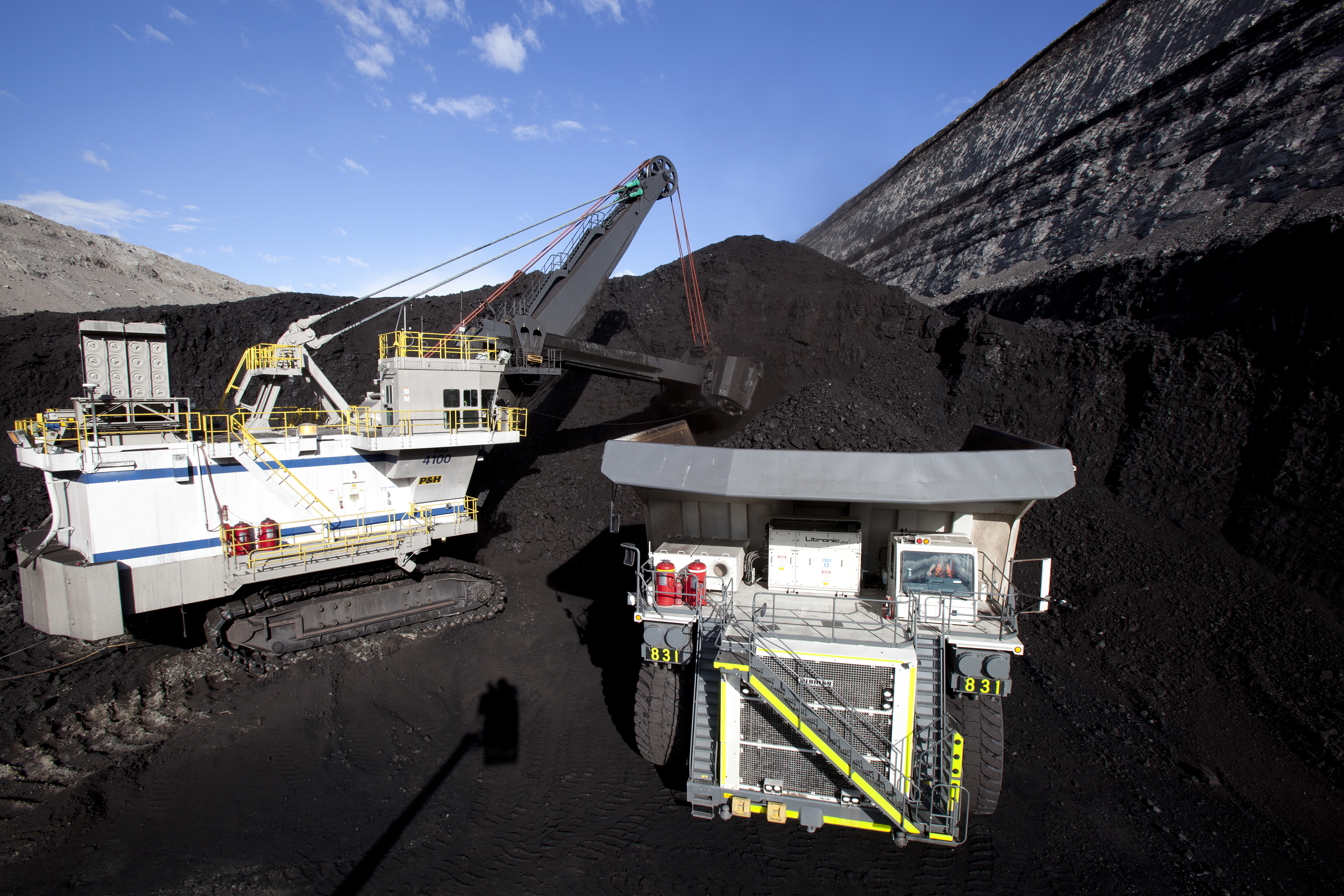
North Antelope Rochelle Mine, the largest estimated coal mine reserve in the world, as of 2013

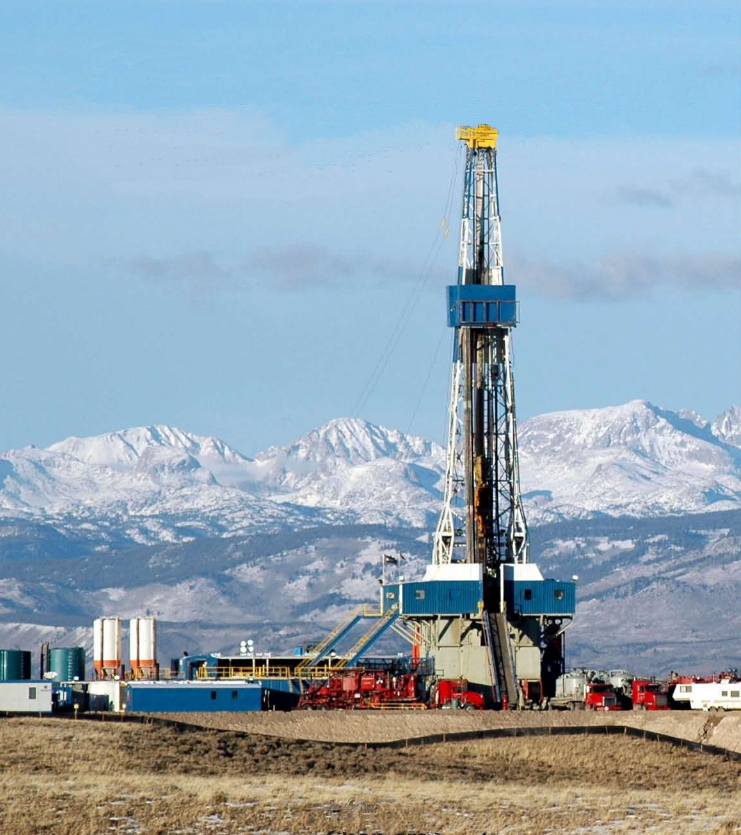
A natural gas rig west of the Wind River Range

Wyoming's mineral commodities include coal, natural gas, coalbed methane, crude oil, uranium, and trona.

==== Coal ====
Wyoming produced 277 million short tons (251 million metric tons) of coal in 2019, a 9% drop from 2018. Wyoming's coal production peaked in 2008, when 514 million short tons (466 million metric tons) were produced. Wyoming has a reserve of 68.7 billion tons (62.3 billion metric tons) of coal. Major coal areas include the Powder River Basin and the Green River Basin. In 2002, coalbed methane extraction (CBM), a method for the extracting of methane, yielded 327.5 billion cubic feet (9.3 km^{3}). In 2016, Wyoming produced 1.77 trillion cubic feet (50 billion m^{3}) of natural gas, ranking the state sixth nationwide in natural gas production.

==== Oil ====
Wyoming produced 53.4 million barrels (8.49×10^{6} m^{3}) of crude oil in 2007, ranking fifth nationwide in oil production. By 2022, Wyoming ranked eighth nationally in the production of both crude oil and natural gas and was the second-largest producer of oil and gas on federal lands. At its peak in 2022, the state had 27,951 producing wells, including 10,120 oil wells and 17,800 gas wells. Wyoming's oil reserves were estimated at 978 million barrels at the end of 2021, representing 2.4% of U.S. reserves. The state had four operational refineries in 2022 with a combined refining capacity of 125,850 barrels per day, a significant reduction from the 14 refineries operating in 1981.

==== Wind energy ====
Because of its geography and altitude, the potential for wind energy in Wyoming is one of the highest of any U.S. state. The Chokecherry and Sierra Madre Wind Energy Project is the largest commercial wind generation facility under development in North America. Carbon County is home to the largest proposed wind farm in the nation. Construction plans have been halted because of proposed new taxes on wind power energy production.

==== Other ====
The Kelsey Lake Diamond Mine in Colorado, less than 1,000 feet (300 m) from the Wyoming border, produced gem-quality diamonds for several years. The Wyoming craton, which hosts the kimberlite volcanic pipes that were mined, underlies most of Wyoming. Wyoming possesses the world's largest known reserve of trona, a mineral used in manufacturing glass, paper, soaps, baking soda, water softeners, and pharmaceuticals. In 2008, Wyoming produced 46 million short tons (41.7 million metric tons) of trona, 25% of the world's production. Although uranium mining in Wyoming is much less active than in previous decades, a sharp rise in uranium prices in 2007 spurred new interest in prospecting and mining. In 2024, the uranium industry in the state experienced a significant resurgence due to a sharp increase in uranium prices. Rare earth metals are also among Wyoming's mineral commodities.

=== Taxes ===
Unlike most other states, Wyoming levies no individual or corporate income tax. It also assesses no tax on retirement income earned and received from another state. Wyoming has a state sales tax of 4%. Counties have the option to collect an additional 1% tax for general revenue and a 1% tax for specific purposes, if approved by voters. Food for human consumption is not subject to sales tax. A county lodging tax varies from 2% to 5%. The state collects a use tax of 5% on items purchased elsewhere and brought into Wyoming. All property tax is based on the property's assessed value; Wyoming's Department of Revenue's Ad Valorem Tax Division supports, trains, and guides local government agencies in the uniform assessment, valuation and taxation of locally assessed property. "Assessed value" means taxable value; "taxable value" means a percentage of the fair market value of property in a particular class. Statutes limit property tax increases. For county revenue, the property tax rate cannot exceed 12 mills (or 1.2%) of assessed value. For cities and towns, the rate is limited to eight mills (0.8%). With very few exceptions, state law limits the property tax rate for all governmental purposes.

Personal property held for personal use is tax-exempt. Inventory held for resale, pollution control equipment, cash, accounts receivable, stocks and bonds are also exempt. Other exemptions include property used for religious, educational, charitable, fraternal, benevolent and government purposes and improvements for handicapped access. Mine lands, underground mining equipment, and oil and gas extraction equipment are exempt from property tax, but companies must pay a gross products tax on minerals and a severance tax on mineral production. Severance taxes on natural resources fund the Wyoming Permanent Mineral Trust Fund, the state's largest sovereign wealth fund.

Wyoming does not collect capital gains tax, gift tax, or estate tax.

In 2008, the Tax Foundation reported that Wyoming had the most "business-friendly" tax climate of any U.S. state. Wyoming state and local governments in fiscal year 2007 collected $2.242 billion in taxes, levies, and royalties from the oil and gas industry. The state's mineral industry, including oil, gas, trona, and coal, provided $1.3 billion in property taxes from 2006 mineral production. As of 2017, Wyoming receives more federal tax dollars as a percentage of state general revenue than any state except Montana.

As of 2016, Wyoming does not require the beneficial owners of LLCs to be disclosed in the filing, which creates an opportunity for a tax haven, according to Clark Stith of Clark Stith & Associates. In fact, Wyoming was the first state to enact a statute authorizing the creation of LLCs. By 2024, company registrations were higher per capita in Wyoming than those in Delaware, which is historically the most prominent US tax haven. Entities linked to foreign adversaries have been observed exploiting Wyoming's business filing policies for fraudulent purposes, prompting state legislators to draft bills for increased oversight and restrictions. One of these bills, targeting foreign adversaries, was signed into law on February 24, 2025.

=== Transportation ===
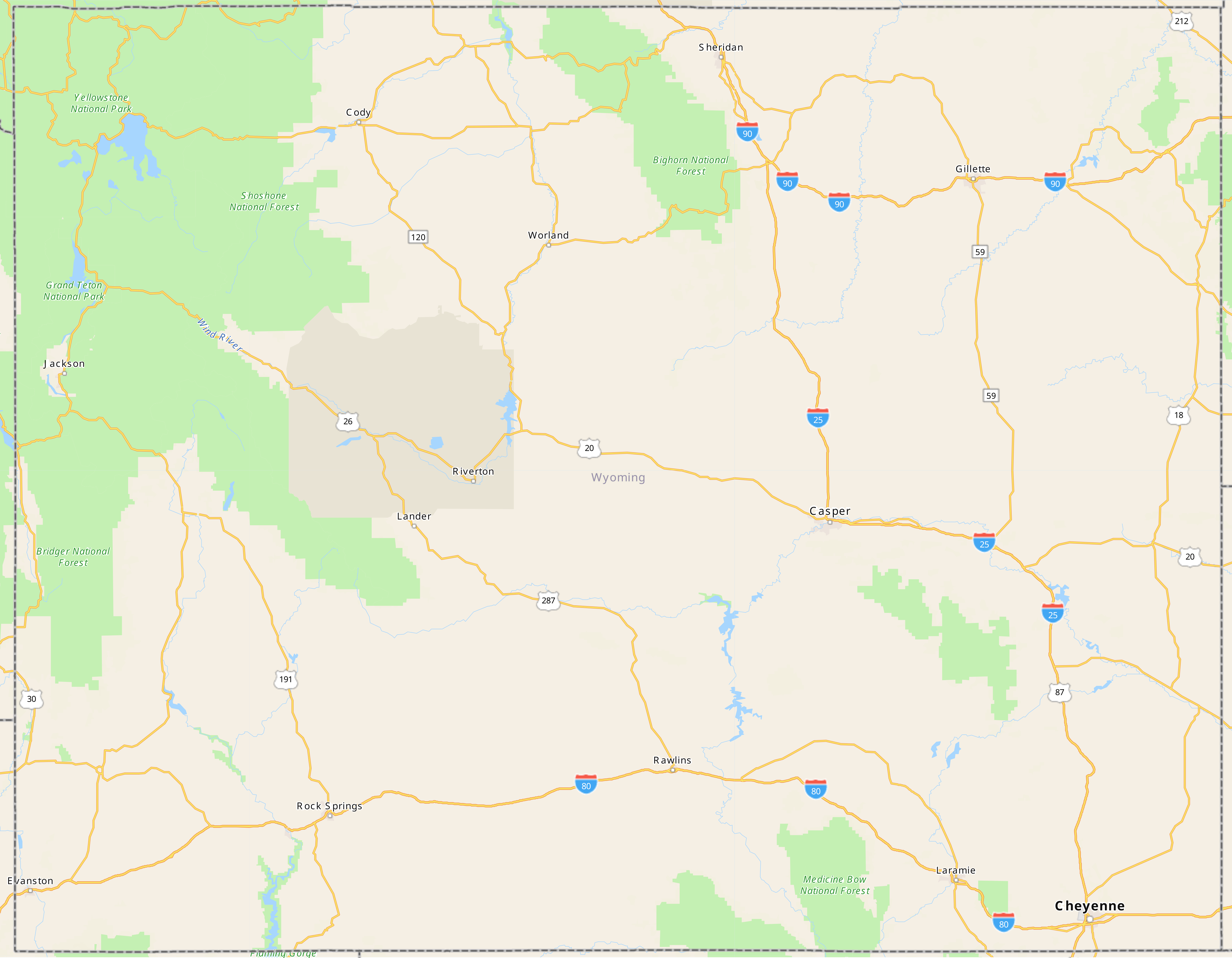
Major highways of Wyoming

Wyoming's largest airport is Jackson Hole Airport, with more than 500 employees. Three interstate highways and 13 U.S. highways pass through Wyoming. The Wyoming state highway system also serves the state.

Interstate 25 enters Wyoming south of Cheyenne and runs north, intersecting Interstate 80 immediately west of Cheyenne. It passes through Casper and ends at Interstate 90, near Buffalo. Interstate 80 crosses the Utah border west of Evanston and runs east through the southern third of the state, passing through Cheyenne before entering Nebraska near Pine Bluffs. Interstate 90 comes into Wyoming near Parkman and cuts through the northeastern part of the state. It serves Gillette and enters South Dakota east of Sundance.

U.S. Routes 14, 16, and the eastern section of U.S. 20 have their western terminus at the eastern entrance to Yellowstone National Park and pass through Cody. U.S. 14 runs eastward before joining I-90 at Gillette. U.S. 14 then follows I-90 to the South Dakota border. U.S. 16 and 20 split off of U.S. 14 at Greybull and U.S. 16 turns east at Worland while U.S. 20 continues south Shoshoni. U.S. Route 287 runs from Fort Collins, Colorado, to Laramie, Wyoming, through a pass between the Laramie Mountains and the Medicine Bow Mountains, then merges with US 30 and I-80 until it reaches Rawlins, where it continues north, passing Lander. Outside of Moran, U.S. 287 is part of a large interchange with U.S. Highways 26, 191, and 89, before continuing north to Yellowstone's southern entrance. U.S. 287 continues north of Yellowstone, but the park separates the two sections.

Other U.S. highways that pass through Wyoming are 18, 26, 30, 85, 87, 89, 189, 191, 212, and 287.

Wyoming is one of only two states (the other is South Dakota) in the 48 contiguous states not served by Amtrak. It was once served by Amtrak's San Francisco Zephyr and Pioneer lines. While no passenger trains roll through Wyoming today, intercity buses continue to connect residents across the state. Intercity bus carriers in the state include Express Arrow, Greyhound Lines, and Jefferson Lines.

Local transit map
Local Transit Systems (Only systems with fixed-route services are shown)

=== Major interstates ===
- I-25 (300.5 mi) connects Denver, Cheyenne, Casper and Buffalo. Most of the highway is connected with US 87. Major junctions include Interstate 80, US 30, US 85, US 26, US Routes 18 & 20 and US 16 before its northern terminus at Interstate 90 in Buffalo.
- I-80 (402.8 mi) connects Evanston, Rock Springs, Rawlins, Laramie and Cheyenne. Major junctions include US 191, US 287, I-25, and US 85 & I-180.
- I-90 (208.8 mi) connects Sheridan, Buffalo and Gillette. Primarily in northeastern Wyoming. Major junctions include US 14, I-25 and US 16.

==== Wind River Indian Reservation ====
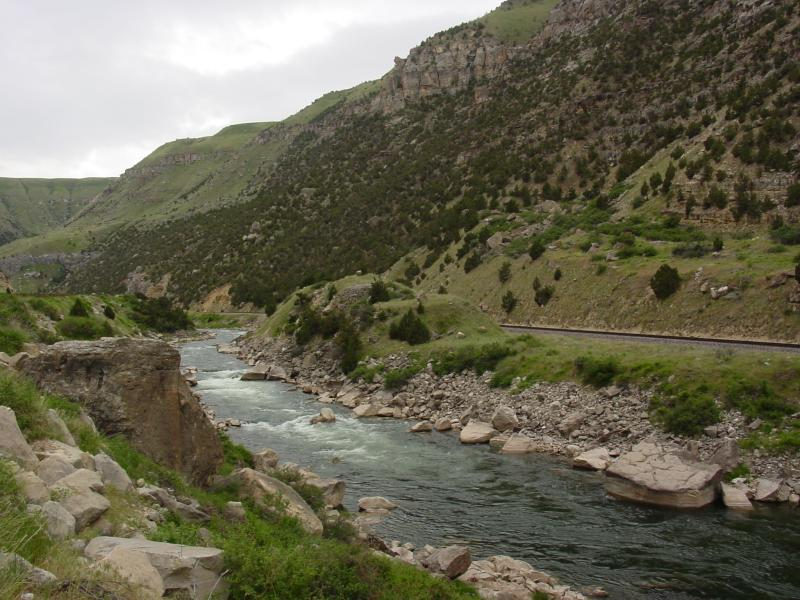
Wind River Canyon

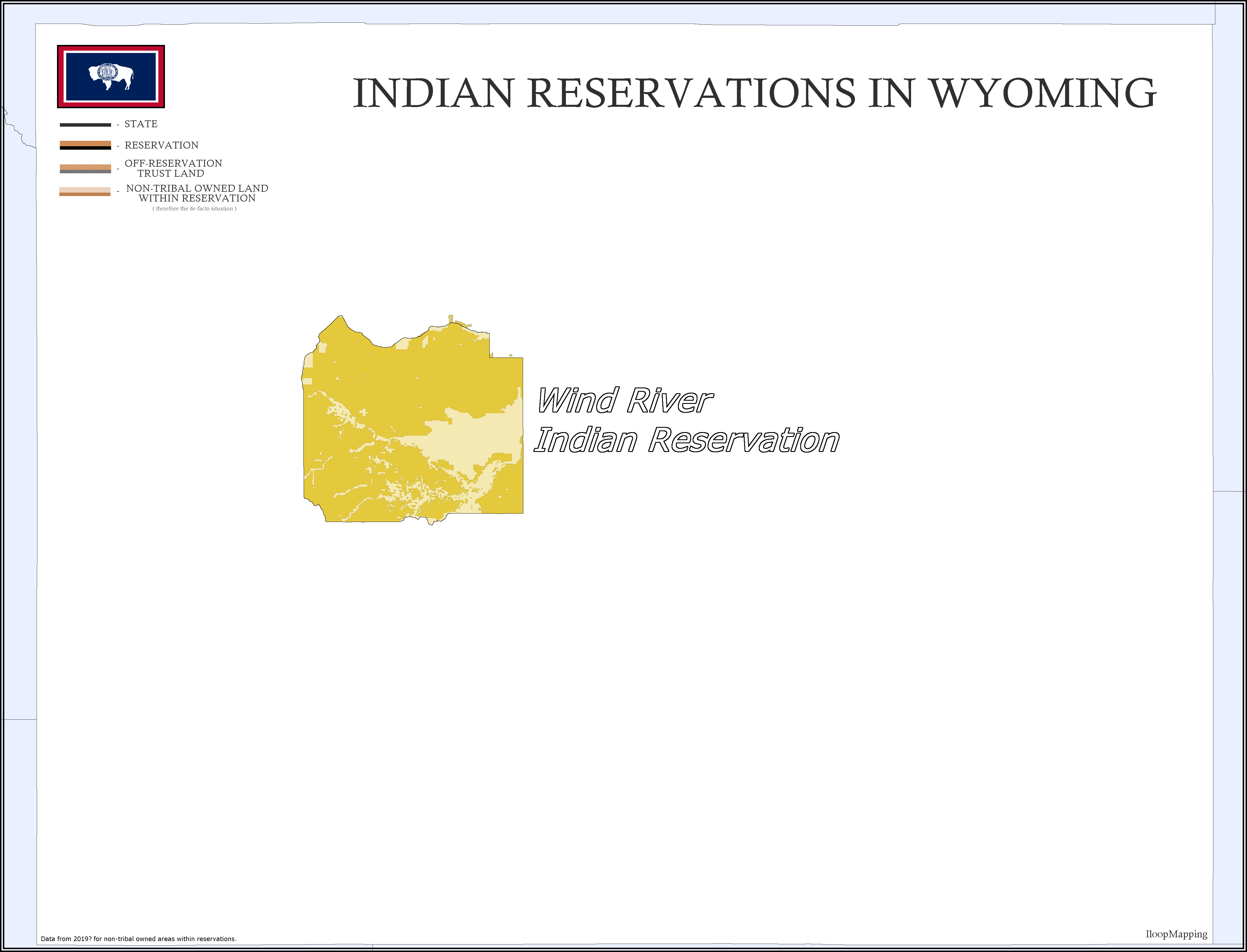
Map of the Wind River Reservation, with shown tribal land.

The Eastern Shoshone and Northern Arapaho tribes share the Wind River Indian Reservation in central western Wyoming, near Lander. The reservation is home to 2,500 Eastern Shoshone and 5,000 Northern Arapaho.

Chief Washakie established the reservation in 1868 as the result of negotiations with the federal government in the Fort Bridger Treaty, but the federal government forced the Northern Arapaho onto the Shoshone reservation in 1876 after it failed to provide a promised separate reservation.

Today the Wind River Indian Reservation is jointly owned, with each tribe having a 50% interest in the land, water, and other natural resources. It is a sovereign, self-governed land with two independent governing bodies: the Eastern Shoshone Tribe and the Northern Arapaho Tribe. Until 2014, the Shoshone Business Council and Northern Arapaho Business Council met jointly as the Joint Business Council to decide matters that affect both tribes. Six elected council members from each tribe served on the joint council.

==== Public lands ====
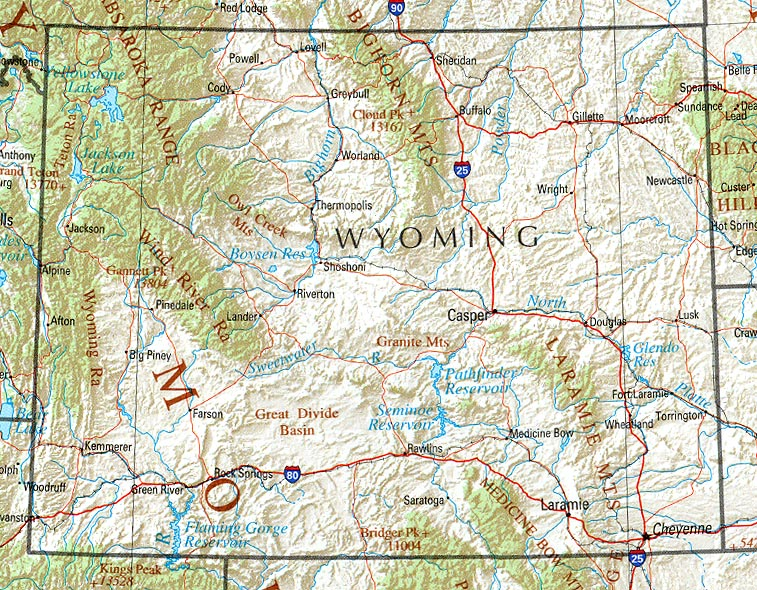
Wyoming terrain map

The federal government owns nearly half of Wyoming's land (about 30,099,430 acres (12,180,810 ha; 121,808.1 km^{2})); the state owns another 3,864,800 acres (1,564,000 ha; 15,640 km^{2}). Most of it is administered by the Bureau of Land Management and U.S. Forest Service in numerous national forests and a national grassland, not to mention vast swaths of public land and an air force base near Cheyenne.

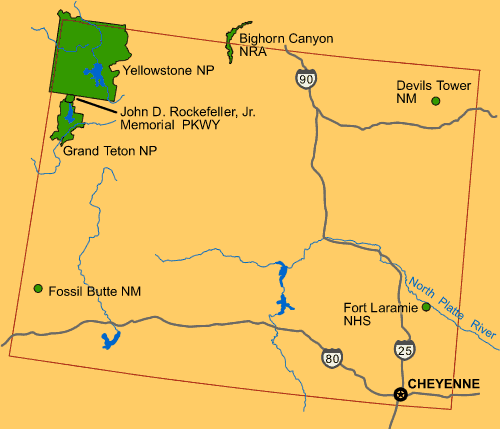
National Park Service sites map

There are also areas managed by the National Park Service and agencies such as the U.S. Fish and Wildlife Service.

National parks

- Grand Teton National Park
- Yellowstone National Park—first designated national park in the world

Memorial parkway

- The John D. Rockefeller Jr. Memorial Parkway connects Yellowstone and Grand Teton.

National recreation areas

- Bighorn Canyon National Recreation Area
- Flaming Gorge National Recreation Area (managed by the Forest Service as part of Ashley National Forest)

National monuments

- Devils Tower National Monument—first national monument in the U.S.
- Fossil Butte National Monument

National historic trails, landmarks and sites

- California National Historic Trail
- Fort Laramie National Historic Site
- Independence Rock National Historic Landmark
- Medicine Wheel/Medicine Mountain National Historic Landmark
- Mormon Pioneer National Historic Trail
- National Register of Historic Places listings in Wyoming
- Oregon National Historic Trail
- Pony Express National Historic Trail

National fish hatcheries

- Jackson National Fish Hatchery
- Saratoga National Fish Hatchery

National wildlife refuges

- National Elk Refuge
- Seedskadee National Wildlife Refuge
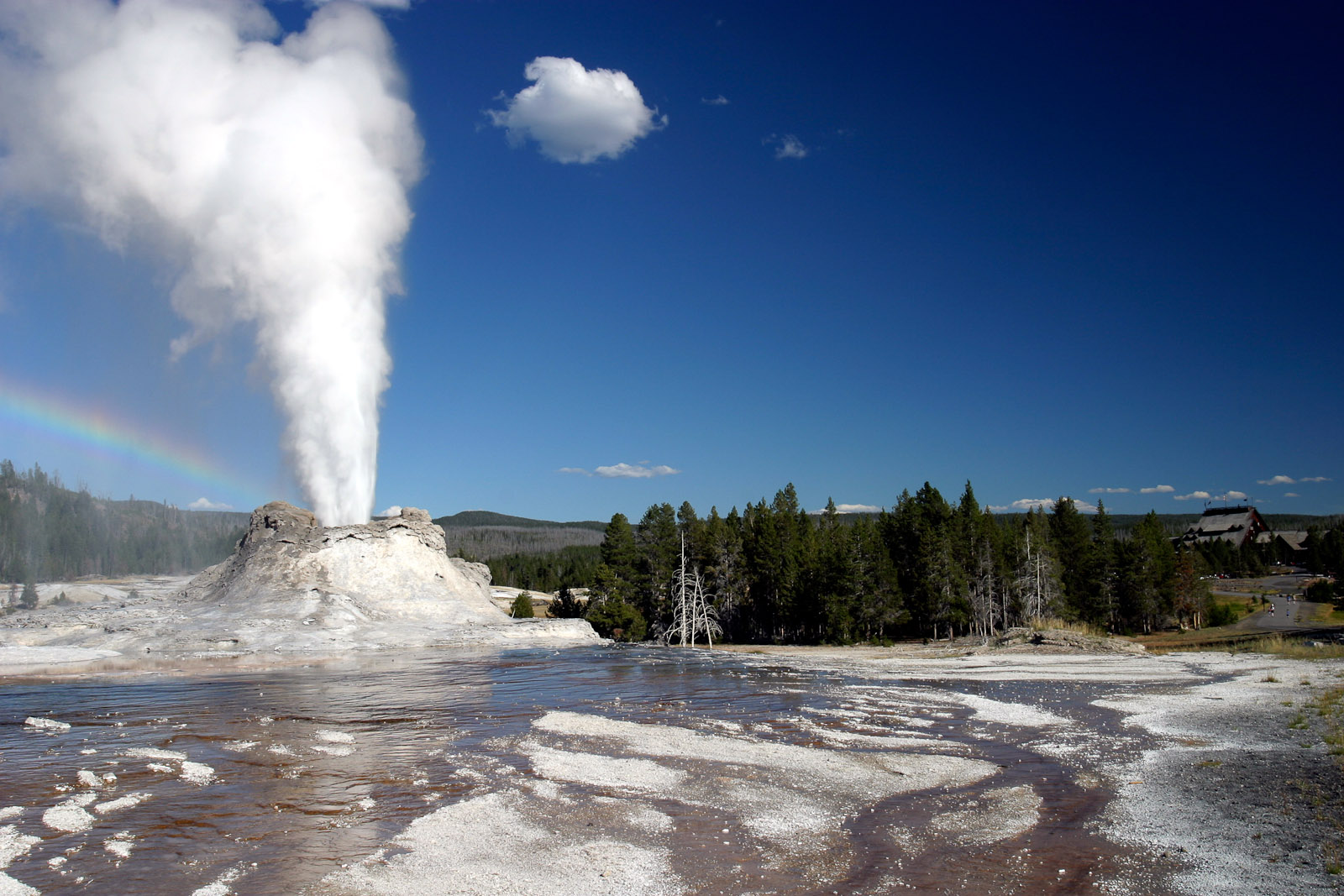
Yellowstone National Park

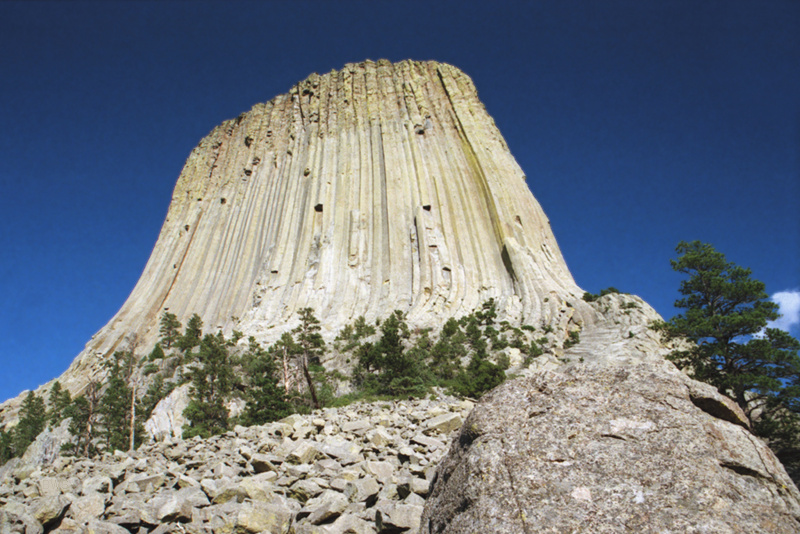
Devils Tower National Monument

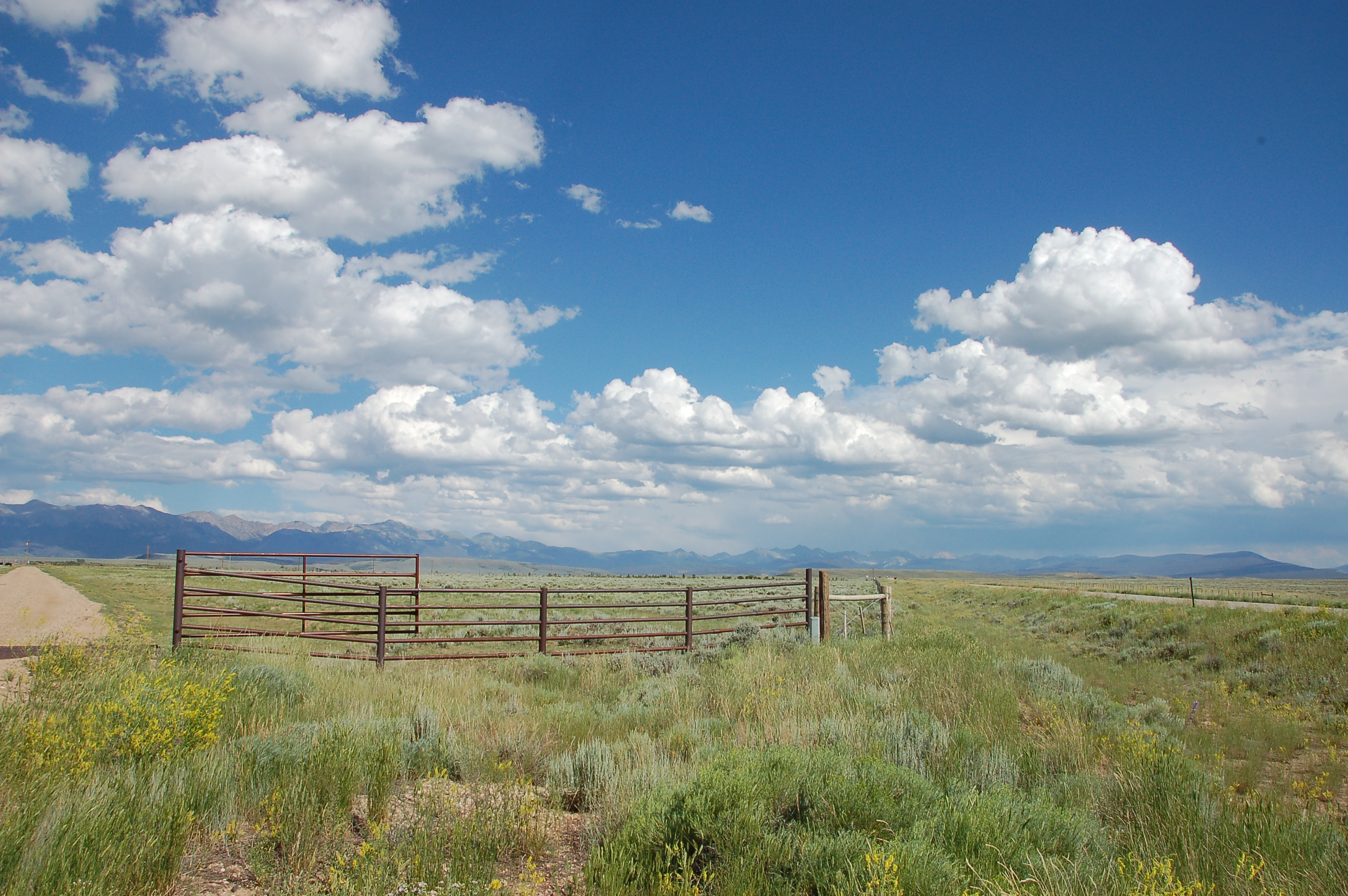
Thunder Basin National Grassland

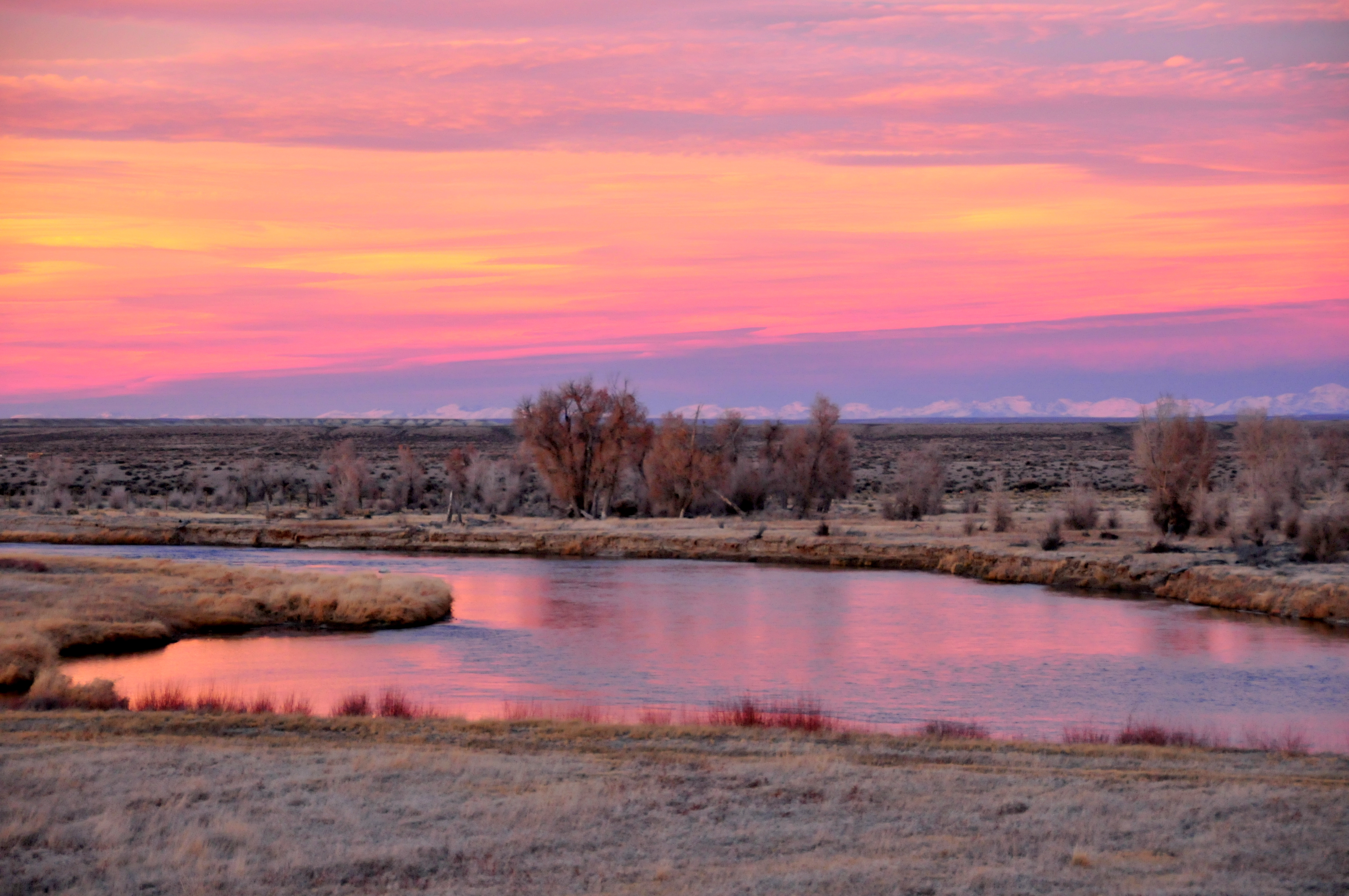
Seedskadee National Wildlife Refuge
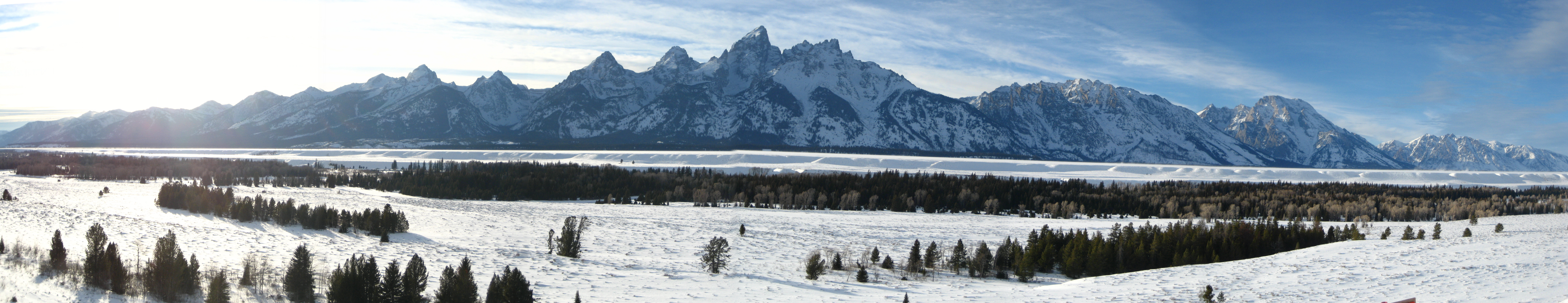
Panoramic view of the Teton Range looking west from Jackson Hole, Grand Teton National Park

== Education ==
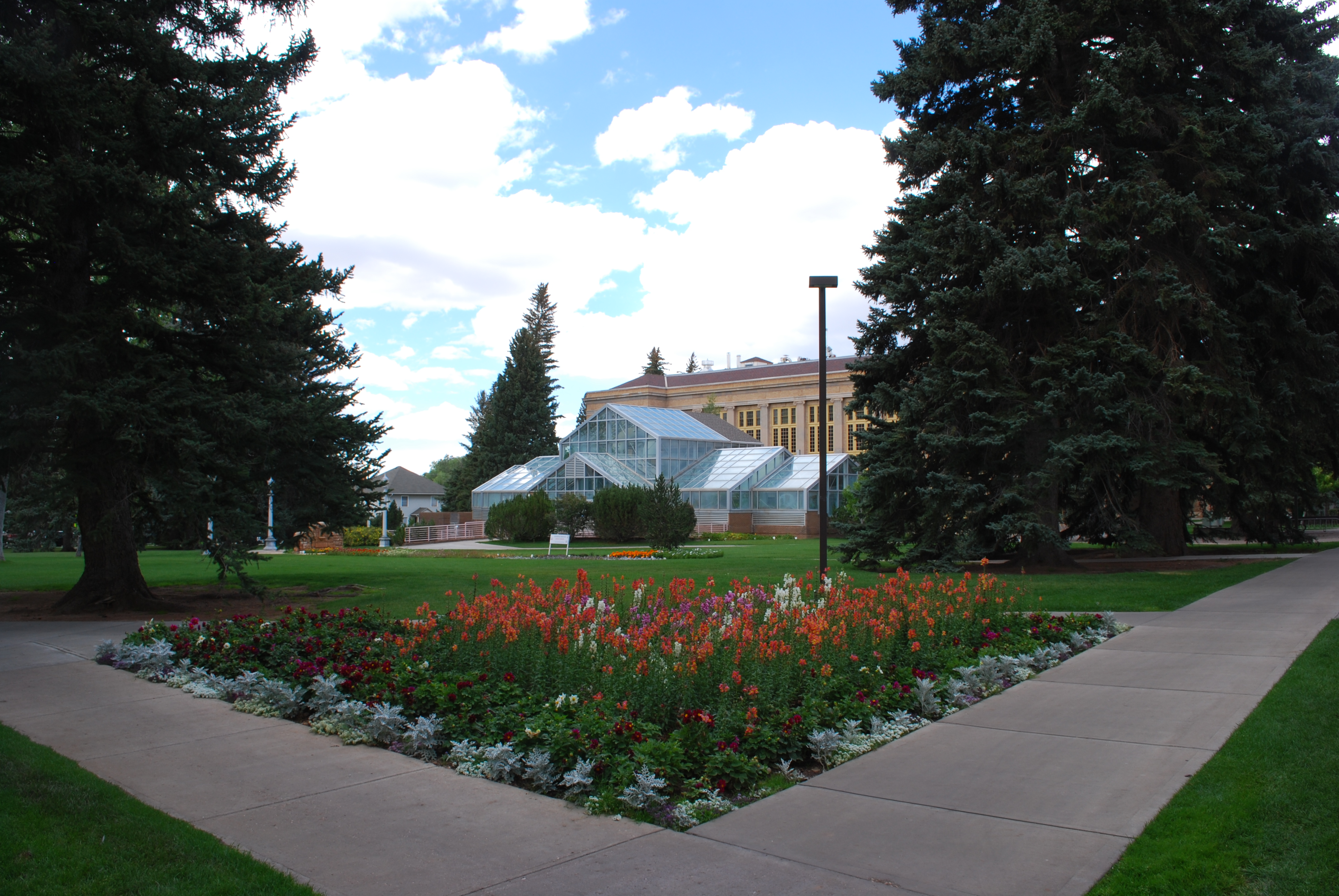
The Rocky Mountain Herbarium at the University of Wyoming

The state superintendent of public instruction, an elected state official, directs public education. The State Board of Education, a nine-member board appointed by the governor, sets educational policy. The constitution prohibits the state from establishing curriculum and textbook selections; these are the prerogative of local school boards. The Wyoming School for the Deaf was the only in-state school dedicated to supporting deaf students before it closed in the summer of 2000.

=== Higher education ===
Wyoming has a public four-year institution, the University of Wyoming in Laramie, and a private four-year college, Wyoming Catholic College, in Lander. There are also seven two-year community colleges.

Before the passing of a new law in 2006, Wyoming had hosted unaccredited institutions, many of them suspected diploma mills. The 2006 law requires unaccredited institutions to make one of three choices: move out of Wyoming, close down, or apply for accreditation. The Oregon State Office of Degree Authorization predicted in 2007 that in a few years the problem of diploma mills in Wyoming might be resolved.

== Media ==
Wyoming's media market consists of 16 broadcast TV stations, radio stations and dozens of small to medium-sized newspapers. There are also a few small independent news sources such as the nonprofit news site Wyofile.com and Oil City News.

== Government and politics ==
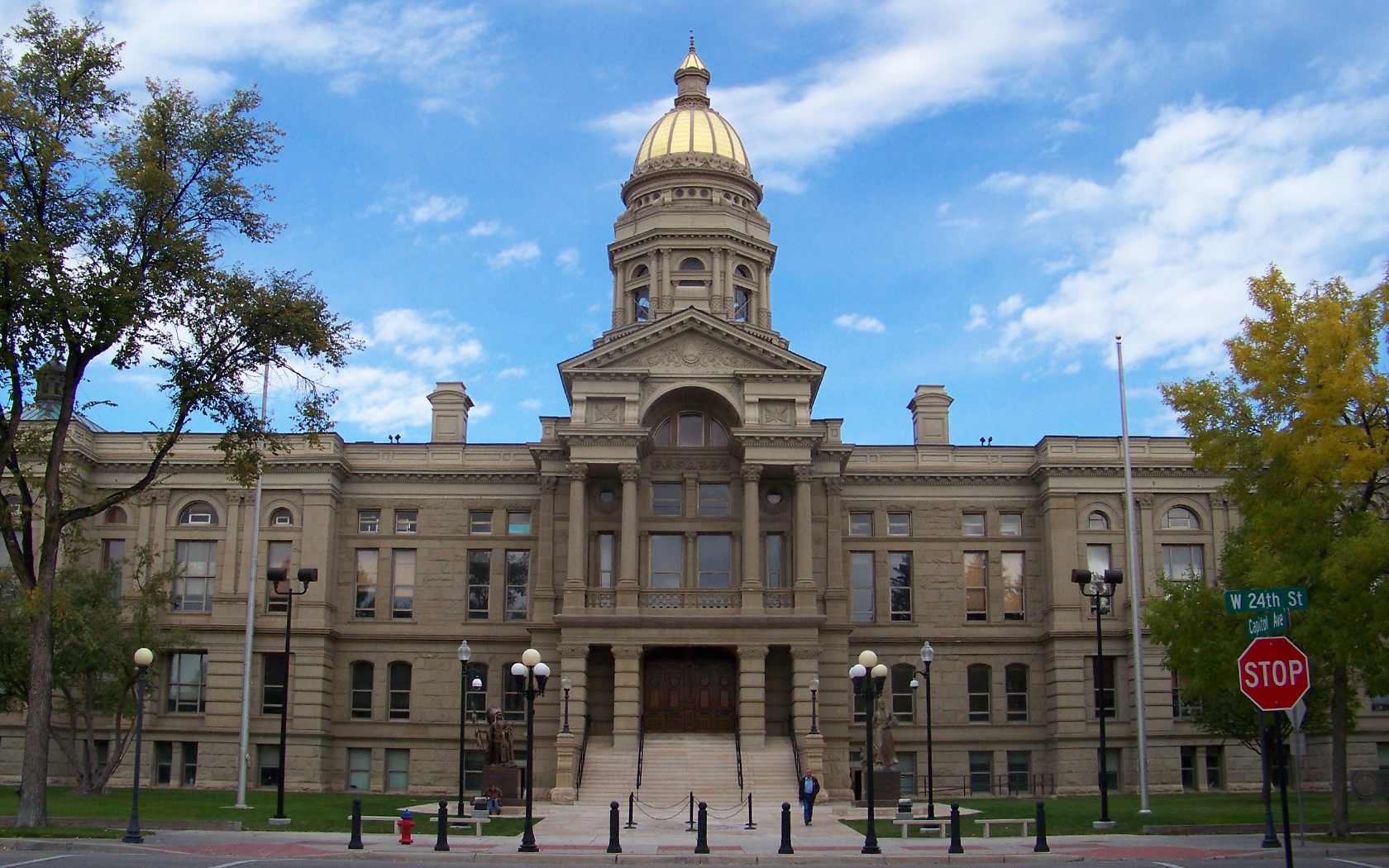
Wyoming State Capitol building, Cheyenne

Logo for the State of Wyoming

=== State government ===
Wyoming's Constitution established three branches of government: the executive, legislative, and judicial branches. The state legislature comprises a House of Representatives with 60 members and a Senate with 30 members. The executive branch is headed by the governor and includes a secretary of state, auditor, treasurer, and superintendent of public instruction. As Wyoming does not have a lieutenant governor, the secretary of state is first in the line of succession.

Wyoming's sparse population warrants the state only one at-large seat in the U.S. House of Representatives, and hence only three votes in the Electoral College.

The Wyoming State Liquor Association is the state's sole legal wholesale distributor of spirits, making it an alcoholic beverage control state. With the exception of wine, state law prohibits the purchase of alcoholic beverages for resale from any other source.

=== Judicial system ===
Wyoming's highest court is the Supreme Court of Wyoming, with five justices presiding over appeals from the state's lower courts. Wyoming is unusual in that it does not have an intermediate appellate court, like most states. This is largely attributable to the state's population and correspondingly lower caseload. Appeals from the state district courts go directly to the Wyoming Supreme Court. Wyoming also has state circuit courts (formerly county courts), of limited jurisdiction, which handle certain types of cases, such as civil claims with lower dollar amounts, misdemeanor criminal offenses, and felony arraignments. Circuit court judges also commonly hear small claims cases as well.

Before 1972, Wyoming judges were selected by popular vote on a nonpartisan ballot. This earlier system was criticized by the state bar which called for the adoption of the Missouri Plan, a system designed to balance judiciary independence with judiciary accountability. In 1972, an amendment to Article 5 of the Wyoming Constitution, which incorporated a modified version of the plan, was adopted by the voters. Since the adoption of the amendment, all state court judges in Wyoming are nominated by the Judicial Nominating Commission and appointed by the Governor. They are then subject to a retention vote by the electorate one year after appointment.

=== Political history ===
Party registration by Wyoming county (as of August 2026): Republican ≥ 50%; Republican ≥ 60%; Republican ≥ 70%; Republican ≥ 80%; Republican ≥ 90%

Voter registration and party enrollment As of August 18, 2026:
Party	Number of voters	Percentage
Republican	213,769	78.10%
Democratic	30,327	11.08%
Unaffiliated	25,047	9.15%
Libertarian	1,736	0.63%
Constitution	545	0.20%
Other/No labels	2,281	0.83%
Total	273,705	100.00%

Wyoming's political history defies easy classification. The state was the first to grant women the right to vote and to elect a woman governor. On December 10, 1869, John Allen Campbell, the first Governor of the Wyoming Territory, approved the first law in United States history explicitly granting women the right to vote. This day was later commemorated as Wyoming Day. On November 5, 1889, voters approved the first constitution in the world granting full voting rights to women.

While the state elected notable Democrats to federal office in the 1960s and 1970s, politics have become decidedly more conservative since the 1980s as the Republican Party came to dominate the state's congressional delegation. Today, Wyoming is represented in Washington by its two Senators, John Barrasso and Cynthia Lummis, and its one member of the House of Representatives, Congresswoman Harriet Hageman. All three are Republicans; a Democrat has not represented Wyoming in the Senate since 1977 or in the House since 1978. The state has not voted for a Democrat for president since 1964, one of only eight times since statehood. In the 2004 presidential election, George W. Bush won his second-largest victory, with 69% of the vote. Former Vice President Dick Cheney was a Wyoming resident and represented the state in Congress from 1979 to 1989.

The last time a Democrat won a statewide election in Wyoming was in 2006, when Democratic governor Dave Freudenthal was re-elected to a second term by a wide margin, winning every county in the state. For 19 of Wyoming's 23 counties, 2006 marked the last time that they voted for the Democratic nominee in a statewide race. Of the remaining 4, Sweetwater County last voted Democratic in the 2008 U.S. House race and Laramie County last voted Democratic in the 2014 Superintendent of Public Instruction race, leaving Teton and Albany as the only counties that Democrats are able to win. Teton, which is composed of affluent resort communities, is reliably Democratic, except in Republican landslides like the 2022 gubernatorial election; Albany, which contains the college town of Laramie, is more competitive.

Republicans are dominant at the state level. They have held a majority in the state senate continuously since 1936 and in the state house since 1964, though Democrats held the governorship for all but eight years between 1975 and 2011. Uniquely, Wyoming elected Democrat Nellie Tayloe Ross as the first woman in United States history to serve as state governor. She served from 1925 to 1927, winning a special election after her husband, William Bradford Ross, unexpectedly died a little more than a year into his term.

Wyoming retains the death penalty. Authorized methods of execution include the gas chamber.

== Culture ==
=== Sports ===
Due to its sparse population, Wyoming lacks any major professional sports teams; the Gillette Mustangs, an indoor football team based in Gillette that began play in 2021 prior to their departure from the city in 2023, were previously the only professional team in the state. However, the Wyoming Cowboys and Cowgirls—particularly the football and basketball teams—are quite popular; their stadiums in Laramie are about 7,200 feet (2,200 m) above sea level, the highest in NCAA Division I. The Wyoming High School Activities Association also sponsors twelve sports and there are three junior ice hockey teams, all of which are members of the NA3HL. Casper has hosted the College National Finals Rodeo since 2001.

=== State symbols ===
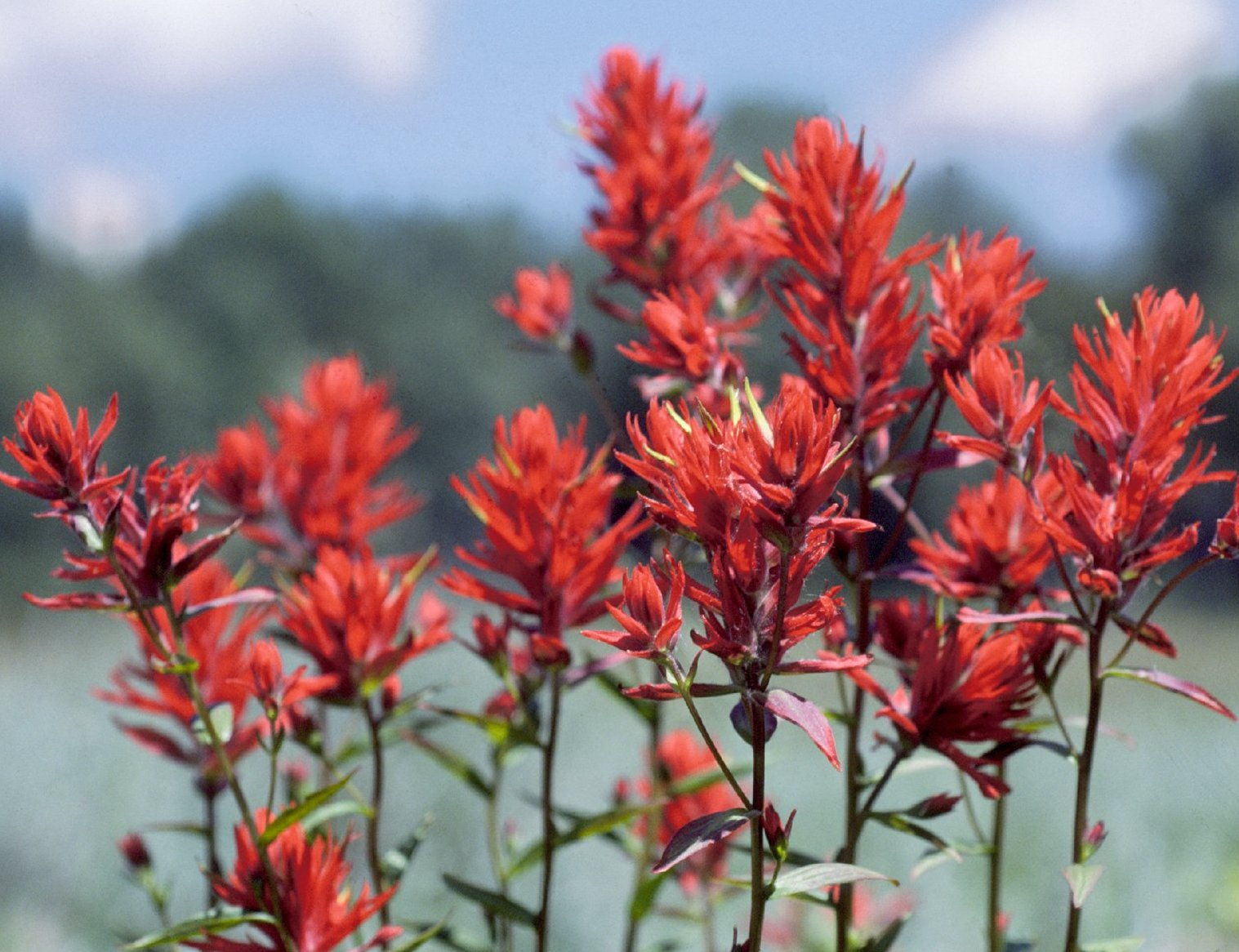
State flower of Wyoming: Indian paintbrush

List of all Wyoming state symbols:

- State bird: western meadowlark (Sturnella neglecta)
- State coin: Sacagawea dollar
- State dinosaur: Triceratops
- State emblem: Bucking Horse and Rider
- State fish: cutthroat trout (Oncorhynchus clarki)
- State flag: Flag of the State of Wyoming
- State flower: Wyoming Indian paintbrush (Castilleja linariifolia)
- State fossil: Knightia
- State gemstone: Wyoming nephrite jade
- State grass: western wheatgrass (Pascopyrum smithii)
- State insect: Sheridan's green hairstreak butterfly (Callophrys sheridanii)
- State mammal: American bison (Bison bison)
- State motto: Equal Rights
- State nicknames: Equality State; Cowboy State; Big Wyoming
- State reptile: horned lizard (Phrynosoma douglassi brevirostre)
- State seal: Great Seal of the State of Wyoming
- State song: "Wyoming" by Charles E. Winter & George E. Knapp
- State sport: rodeo
- State tree: plains cottonwood (Populus sargentii)

== See also ==
- Bibliography of Wyoming history
- Index of Wyoming-related articles
- Outline of Wyoming
- Chess in Wyoming
- Sheep wagon
- Wyoming as a corporate haven

== Notes ==
Preceded by Idaho	List of U.S. states by date of statehood Admitted on July 10, 1890 (44th)	Succeeded by Utah
