= Chris Johnson =

Chris or Christopher Johnson may refer to:

== Entertainment ==
- C. David Johnson (born 1955), Canadian actor
- Chris J. Johnson (born 1977), American actor
- Chris Johnson (presenter) (born 1991), BBC television presenter
- Chris Johnson (drummer), American Musician
- Christopher Johnson, fictional alien refugee from the film District 9

== Sports ==
=== American football ===
- Christopher Johnson (American football executive) (born 1959), American businessman and sports executive
- Chris Johnson (cornerback, born 1979), American football cornerback
- Chris Johnson (cornerback, born 2004), American football cornerback
- Chris Johnson (running back) (born 1985), American football running back
- Chris Johnson (safety, born 1960), American football strong safety
- Chris Johnson (safety, born 1971), American football free safety

=== Australian rules football ===
- Chris Johnson (footballer, born 1976), Australian rules footballer for Fitzroy and Brisbane
- Chris Johnson (footballer, born 1986), Australian rules footballer for Melbourne and Carlton

=== Basketball ===
- Chris Johnson (basketball, born 1985), American forward/center from Louisiana State University who has played in the NBA
- Chris Johnson (basketball, born 1990), American forward/guard from University of Dayton who has played in the NBA

=== Other sports ===
- Chris Johnson (baseball) (born 1984), American third and first baseman
- Chris Johnson (boxer) (born 1971), Jamaican boxer
- Chris Johnson (rugby league) (born 1960), rugby league footballer of the 1980s for Great Britain, Leigh, and Swinton
- Chris Johnson (rugby union) (born 1986), English rugby union footballer
- Christopher Johnson (Canadian football) (born 1991), Canadian football linebacker

== Other ==
- Christopher Johnson (physician) (1536?–1597), English physician, educator and poet
- Christopher Hollis Johnson (1904–1978), British chemist and physicist
- Christopher Louis McIntosh Johnson (1931–2012), British journalist and economist
- Christopher R. Johnson (born 1960), professor of computer science at the University of Utah
- Christopher W. Johnson (born 1965), professor of computing science at the University of Glasgow
- Chris Johnson (Maine politician), American politician from Maine
- Chris Johnson (Mississippi politician) (born 1978), American politician from Mississippi
- Christopher Johnson (surgeon) (1782–1866), British surgeon and mayor of Lancaster in 1832
- Chris Johnson (architect), British architect that designed "The Doughnut", the headquarters of the GCHQ (Government Communications Headquarters)
- Chris Johnson (artist) (born 1948), American fine art photographer, professor of photography at the California College of the Arts
- Chris Johnson (game developer), Australian game developer and one of the creators of Moirai
- Chris Johnson (runner), winner of the 1965 mile run at the NCAA Division I Indoor Track and Field Championships

== See also ==
- Christopher Johnston (disambiguation)
- Christine Johnson (disambiguation)
- Christa Johnson (born 1958), American professional golfer
