= Environmental issues in Wyoming =

US state environmental issues

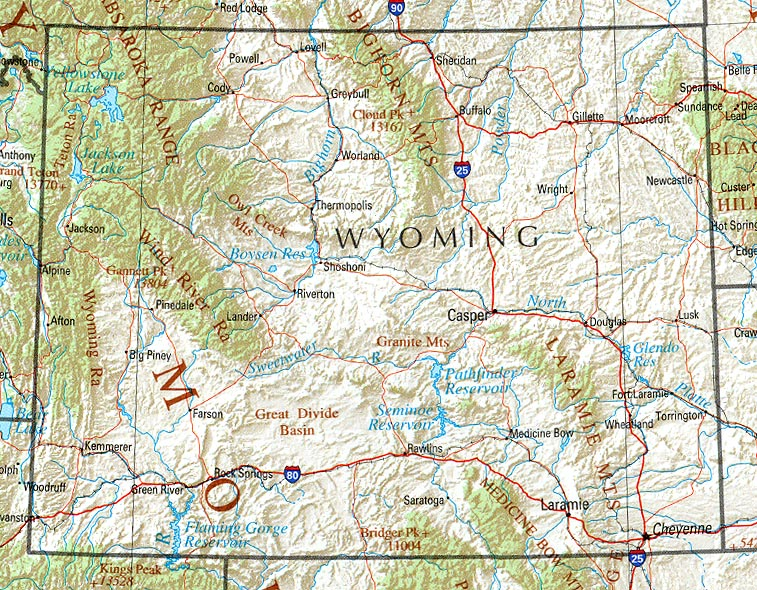
Relief map of Wyoming

The U.S. state of Wyoming faces a broad array of environmental issues stemming from natural resource extraction, species extirpation, non-native species introduction, and pollution. Wildlife species that have been affected by these issues include:

- Gray wolf (Canis lupus), locally extirpated
- Grizzly bear (Ursus arctos horribilis)
- Lodgepole pine (Pinus contorta), affected by mountain pine beetles, which threaten to disrupt forests in Wyoming
- Greater sage grouse (Centrocercus urophasianus), affected by natural gas extraction.
- Wyoming toad (Anaxyrus baxteri), extinct in the wild

Within the state organizations and governments are working to combat these environmental threats and restore balance to the ecology. Protection of some of these species has proven controversial.

== Natural resource extraction ==
Wyoming is a resource rich state with a history of boom and bust cycles. The 1970s energy crisis initiated a coal-mining boom in Wyoming that lasted until the early 80's. The state's latest energy boom (1995–2010) is due to increased development in oil and natural gas production as well as further growth in the coal-mining industry. Despite the role of natural resource extraction in the economy, growth in Wyoming is characterized by severe environmental consequences.

=== Industry development ===
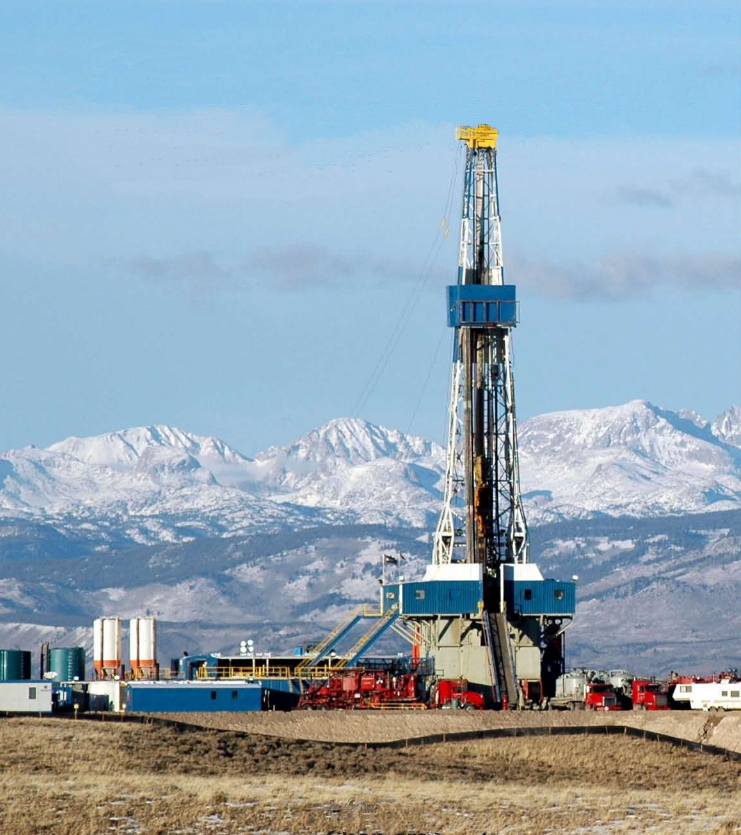
A drilling rig located in the Pinedale Anticline

Production in Wyoming's oil and gas industry grew from $7.3 billion to $17.6 billion between 2000 and 2006. The U.S. Census Bureau recorded a 73.1% increase in the population of Sublette County, Wyoming, from 5,920 to 10,247, between 2000 and 2010.

According to the U.S. Energy Information Administration, Wyoming produces 41% of the nation's coal, or as much as the next seven coal producing states combined. The Wyoming Mining Association (WMA) reports that the coal mining industry alone contributed over $1.15 billion to the state and local governments in 2009.

Two of the nation's largest natural gas fields, Pinedale Anticline and Jonah Field, are located in Sublette County, Wyoming. Wyoming accounts for roughly one tenth of U.S. natural gas production. The natural gas industry in the state continues to expand due to low levels of consumption and development of pipeline systems that facilitate transport to consumers in California and the Midwest.

Oil production in Wyoming only accounts for about 3 percent of U.S. production. However, Wyoming's oil shale deposits contain one fourth of global shale oil reserves, or about 300 billion barrels. Oil shale is not currently an economically recoverable source of energy, as current technology is unable to extract the shale efficiently, but these reserves could pave the way for further development in the state.

Energy development in Wyoming has generated well-deserved attention, as the state has been able to maintain a relatively stable economy throughout the current recession. While economic growth has proven beneficial in many aspects, it has also adversely impacted the environment of the least populous U.S. state, affecting the quality of air, water, soil and wildlife. Recently, concentration on degradation of air quality and damage to wildlife habitat has been emphasized by environmental activists.

== Air pollution ==
Development in Wyoming's oil and gas industry is transforming what has historically been some of the cleanest air in the nation to some of the most polluted. Production of natural gas contributes to heightened ozone levels. Ozone is a molecule consisting of three oxygen atoms that is harmful to animals when present in the lower atmosphere. Winter months correlate with heightened ozone levels in the region. Temperature inversions occur when cool air on the ground covered by a layer of warmer air trap volatile organic compounds and nitrous oxides in the lower atmosphere, whose interactions create ozone. According to the Environmental Protection Agency (EPA), winter 2010 saw ozone pollution levels in the Upper Green River Basin of Sublette County, Wyoming surpass the worst days of any major U.S. city.

== Water pollution ==
Cows often graze on public land. Their manure pollutes rivers with E. coli and Salmonella.

In 2015, the Wyoming Legislature declared trespassing to collect data a crime with Senate File 12 as well as making the action a civil violation with Senate File 80. This penalizes scientists and journalists who are studying pollution.

=== Health effects ===
Excessive ozone levels are harmful to human health, especially in children and elderly people. Effects include lung damage, worsened asthma, reduced lung capacity, and increased premature deaths. More commonly reported effects include watery eyes, bloody noses, and breathlessness. In winter 2010, Wyoming issued 10 warnings for citizens to remain indoors in order to avoid spikes in ozone pollution.

=== CURED lawsuit ===
Sublette County-based organization Citizens United for Responsible Energy Development (CURED), represented by environmental firm Earthjustice, served the EPA with intent to file lawsuit in early October 2011 unless the Upper Green River Basin be formally designated as a nonattainment area, or one that does not comply with current national standards set by the Clean Air Act. Designation as a nonattainment area would initiate efforts to restore ozone levels to those in agreement with the Clean Air Act, ensuring that citizens' health is not at risk. Former Wyoming Governor Dave Freudenthal advised that the Upper Green River Basin be designated as a region that exceeds national standards for acceptable ozone levels in 2009. Failure of the EPA to formally recognize the Upper Green River Basin as a nonattainment area is what instigates CURED's threat to sue.

== Wildlife ==
=== Gray wolf ===
The gray wolf was once the most widespread mammal in the northern hemisphere with home ranges exceeding 600 miles (970 km).

==== Eradication ====
In the 1800s, grazing opportunities for domesticated livestock increased. In Montana from 1867 to 1890 cattle numbers rose from 67000 to 1.1 million and sheep from 300000 to 2.2 million. With the reduction of wild hoofed prey, wolves turned to cattle and sheep for prey. Predation of livestock was a common rationale behind wolf elimination. Additionally, wolves had a negative view by the majority of the population during that time. Even Theodore Roosevelt, pioneer of conservation described the wolf as a "beast of waste and desolation." Wolves were killed by hunting, trapping, snaring and poisoning. Bounties on wolf pelts were offered by state governments and livestock associations. In 1915 the U.S. Federal government established the Division of Rodent and Predator Control Which further augmented wolf eradication. This pursuit of wolves combined with habitat loss to drive wolves out of most areas across North America. Wyoming, Idaho, Montana and Yellowstone National Park had reached total wolf eradication by the 1930s.

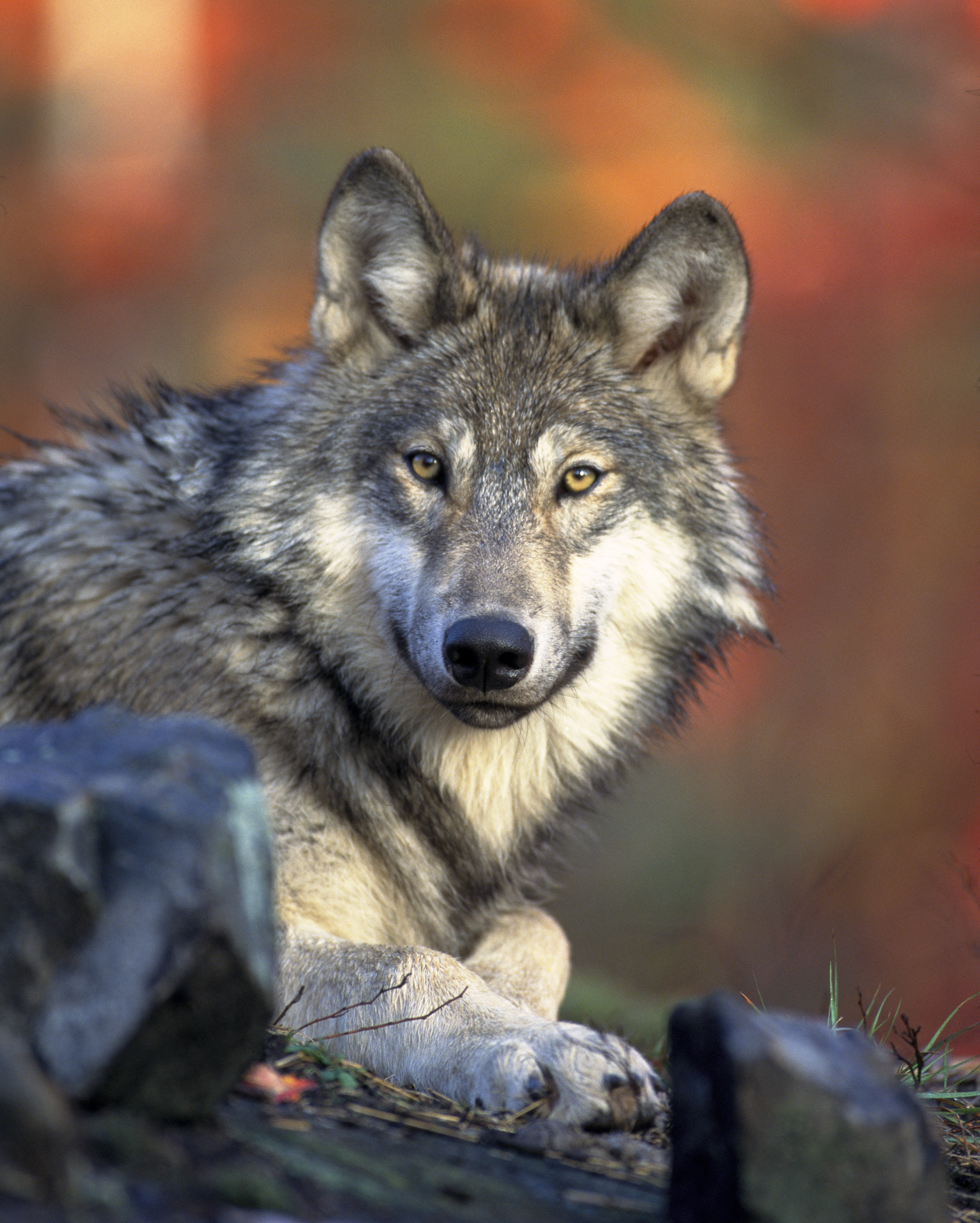
Gray Wolf.

==== Protection and reintroduction ====
The gray wolf was provided protection under the Endangered Species Act (ESA) in 1974. ESA protection made it illegal to kill wolves or destroy their habitats. Listing wolves under the ESA also initiated the production of a recovery plan. The recovery originally planned for wolf recovery through natural wolf dispersal from Canada but was later modified.

In 1994 U.S. Fish and Wildlife submitted a report to congress recommending wolves be reestablished in Idaho and Yellowstone National Park as nonessential experimental populations. In March 1995 3 groups of 6, 5 and 3 wolves were released into Yellowstone National Park. This release marked the beginning of a successful reintroduction effort coordinated with multiple wildlife agencies from multiple U.S. States and Canadian Provinces. A total of 31 wolves were released in Yellowstone National Park.

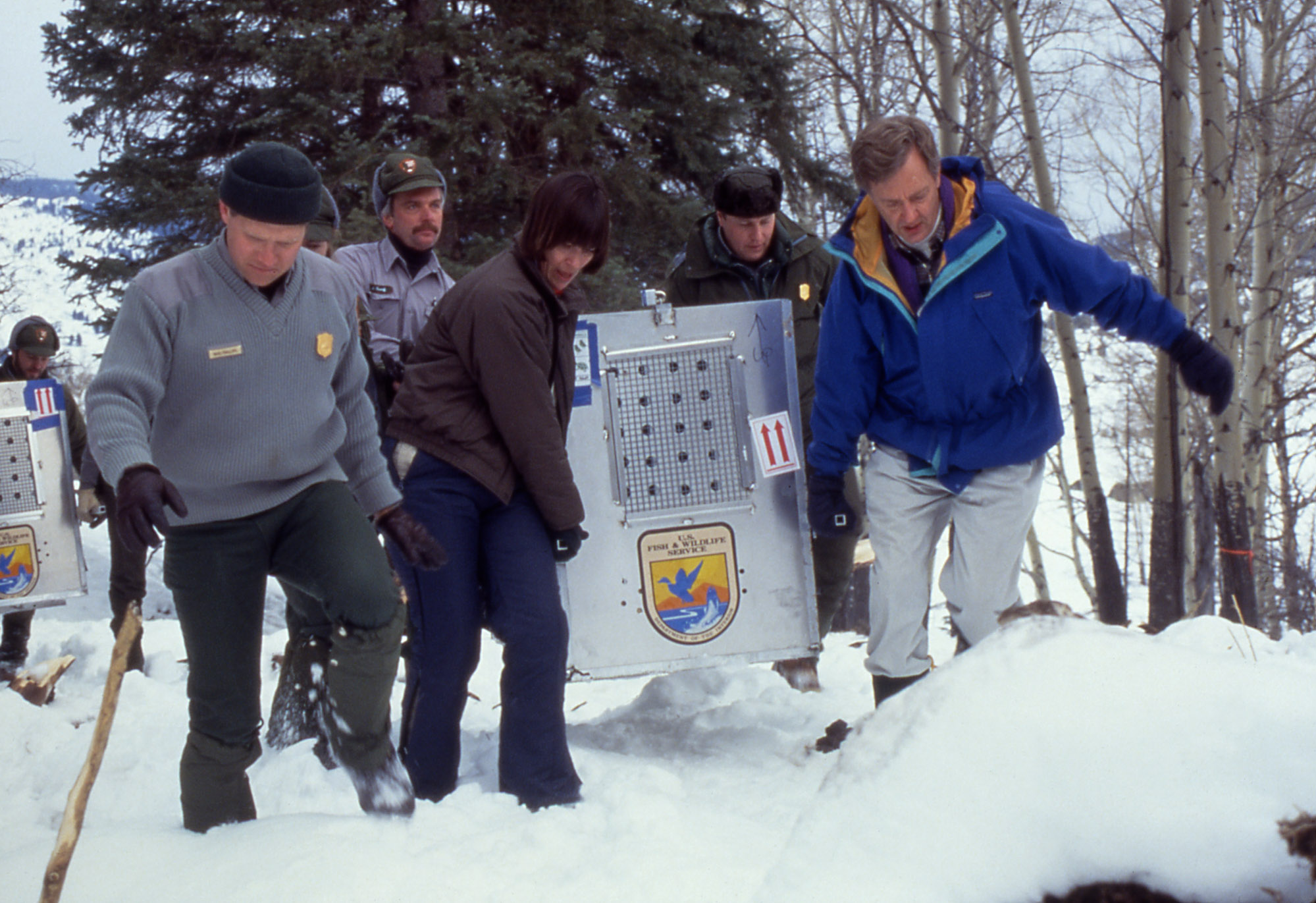
U.S. Fish and Wildlife and Wyoming Game and Fish Officials carry a reintroduced wolf to an acclimation pen.

==== Proposed removal from ESA ====
The Gray wolf in Wyoming is on the verge of being removed from the Endangered Species Act. Removal has been approved by the U.S. Fish and Wildlife Service, Secretary of the Interior Ken Salazar and Wyoming Game and Fish. The wolf management plan that has been agreed upon by all parties requires a minimum of 100 wolves including ten breeding pairs in Wyoming. Currently there are 1650 wolves and 110 breeding pairs in Wyoming Idaho and Montana. Wolf numbers have exceeded recovery goals for the past 11 years. U.S. Fish and Wildlife will continue to collaborate with Wyoming Game and Fish following delisting from the ESA. Delisting will also allow Wyoming to implement a trophy hunting season for wolves outside Yellowstone National Park. Tactics used during the removal process have been highly political. The Casper Star Tribune reported that Wyoming Senator John Barrasso placed a hold on a senate vote on the nomination of Daniel Ashe as the U.S. Fish and Wildlife Director. Barrasso lifted the hold following a commitment from Secretary of Interior Ken Salazar to "aggressively pursue a solution" to the wolf delisting dispute.

==== Arguments and organizations for delisting ====
Groups for delisting include, Wyoming Game and Fish, Wyoming Governor Matt Mead, hunting public, hunting outfitters, Congressional Sportsmen's Foundation (CSF), National Rifle Association (NRA), Safari Club International (SCI), Rocky Mountain Elk Foundation (RMEF), American Sheep Industry Association and National Cattlemen's Beef Association. The primary argument for delisting is that wolf population numbers are well above recovery levels. This recovery indicates that the wolves are ready to be managed at a state level. Several groups believe that high wolf numbers are detrimental to elk and moose populations sharing the same habitat. Other conservation groups want wolf management at the state level so that stakeholders have more say in management decisions.

==== Arguments and organizations against delisting ====
Earlier attempts in 2008 and 2009 to delist the Gray Wolf were prevented with lawsuits from the Sierra Club. There are various groups against removing the gray wolf. Groups opposing delisting include Defenders of Wildlife, Western Wildlife Conservancy, Sierra Club and others. Arguments against delisting wolves include fear of overexploitation through trophy hunting, and a population crash. Idaho, Montana and Wyoming all plan to have a trophy game season for wolves following delisting. In addition to a trophy season, wolves found outside the trophy area of Wyoming may be shot as a predator, no license required.

=== Grizzly bear ===
Grizzly bear populations are expanding across the state under the protection of the federal Endangered Species Act (ESA). Management of the grizzly bear population includes relocation. Large carnivore biologists use this management tool to minimize conflicts between humans and grizzly bears. In 2021, state officials requested the U.S. Fish and Wildlife Service to remove grizzly bears from ESA protections in the Greater Yellowstone Ecosystem which includes northwestern Wyoming, southwestern Montana, and eastern Idaho. State management would minimize human disruption and maximize hunting opportunities while meeting the goals set by the U.S. Fish and Wildlife Service.

=== Pine beetle ===
Wyoming faces a range of ecological risks but perhaps none greater than the current infestation of pine beetle populations across the coniferous forests of the state and surrounding regions. The problem is extensive, far-reaching, and almost all encompassing. Steps are being taken to prevent further spread of the infestation but in expert opinions those steps are coming too little too late. In addition, there is an entire future forest that will be threatened by these beetles and climate change.

==== Infestation ====
The Mountain pine beetle typically attacks in the late summer and lay larva in the trees that survive under the bark until the next summer. During the summer infestation, the beetle produces a blue fungus that at epidemic levels usually destroys even healthy trees. Trees that have been affected are marked by brown pine needles and a bluish hue to the inside of their bark. In a typical climate large amounts of the beetle populations are killed during the days in the middle of winter when the temperature falls to minus 30 for weeks at a time. Today these temperatures are not being seen in forests, allowing pine beetles to survive the winter and come back in greater populations the next summer. In some instances, however, the temperatures are staying so warm the beetles are allowed time for two eating cycles causing even further devastation to tree populations.

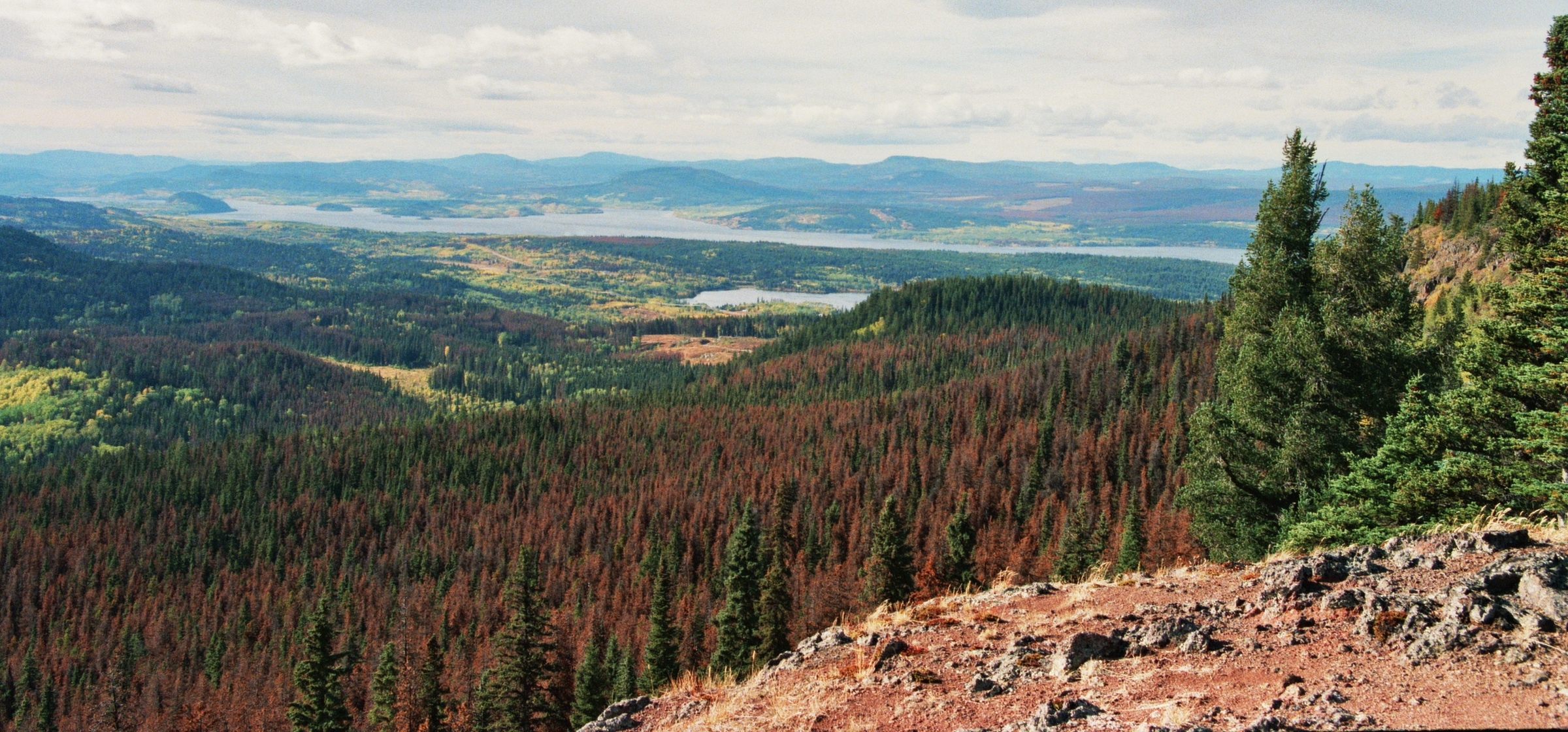
Pine Beetle damage on Mt. Fraser in British Columbia.

==== Distribution ====
Currently in Wyoming it is estimated that nearly 3.65 million acres (14,800 km^{2}) have been infected and across the United States that number is above 40 million acres. The beetles usually attack the Lodgepole Pine populations but because the epidemic is at such a monumental scale the beetles are attacking any coniferous tree including: Ponderosa Pine, Limber Pine, Douglas Fir, Subalpine Fir, Silver Fir, Spruce, and Cedar trees. Through the next ten years it is estimated 100,000 trees will fall daily in forests across the country due to pine beetle infestations.

==== Causes and prevention ====
In the early 1800s settlers mismanaged forests in the hopes of preventing fires but only allowed stand densities to reach critical levels that allowed beetles to easily spread from one tree to the next. In addition rising global temperature have allowed these beetle populations to grow and thrive at unheard of rates. Lastly a multi-year drought that extended from the mid-1990s to the early 2000s made trees weak and susceptible to attacks.

The Southeastern region of Wyoming is the most infected region. Experts already predict by the year 2012 90% of the trees in these regions will be dead or infected. Steps are, however, being taken to prevent further infection and distribution. Throughout the region the local forest service is safely cutting these trees in an attempt to keep beetle populations at bay and to prevent the risk of falling trees in heavily traveled areas of the forest. With the future of the forests in mind forest services are also working on forest recovery. To do this they are replanting/-seeding areas of the forest to create a diverse and manageable environment for the future ecology of the area. This recovery process also entails a resiliency aspect that will allow future trees to be protected from pine beetle infestations by reducing stand densities.

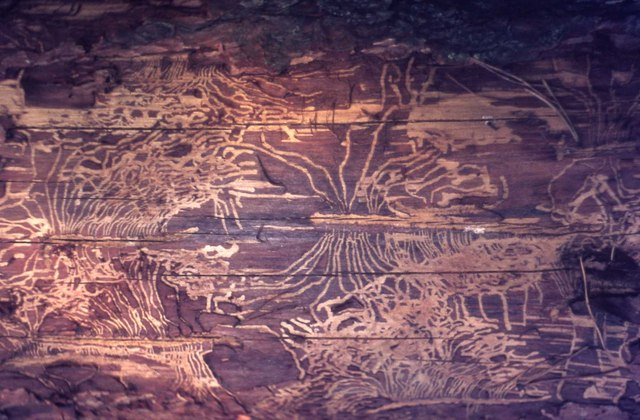
Bark beetle galleries on a tree in the United Kingdom. Bark beetles and other kinds of invasive pine beetles are transported between different regions of the world and will become stronger as climate change puts stress on natural ecosystems.

==== Ecological effect ====
This combination of mismanaged forests and deadfall caused by pine beetle adds up to an inevitable conclusion that fires will destroy these forests. These fire risks and falling trees caused by the beetle infestation have the ability to affect over 3,700 miles of roads, 1,300 miles of trails, and 69 miles of transmission and distribution power lines. Consequently, it is important that the forest service manages these falling trees by cutting certain sections of forest down to aid in the safety of these areas. This catastrophe will severely impact the wildlife of the region. Many animal species rely on these forests for both predation and climate protection. American Elk populations will likely decrease due to the loss of protection as will American Marten populations due to the Marten's reliance on thick, heavily forested areas to hunt. Pine squirrel populations will likely experience the most dramatic decrease because the squirrels rely on pine seeds to survive the harsh winters. Other animal populations that will be effected include the Northern goshawk and the snowshoe hare as their habitats are destroyed and their nutrition resources disappear.

==== Future forests ====
If global climate simulators prove correct, then in fifty years, when these forests are returning, the heavily temperature effected pine beetle populations could potentially be even stronger and in regions today protected by the colder climates at higher elevations. The predicted 2.5 degree Celsius temperature increase will allow the beetles to further migrate into regions of massive Canadian forests and into the eastern United States that had once been protected by the vast plains of Middle America. Studies show the pine beetle populations beginning to slow. The 2010 mortality rate of trees was a quarter of what it had been the two previous years. The beetles are running out of trees to infect.

=== Sage grouse ===
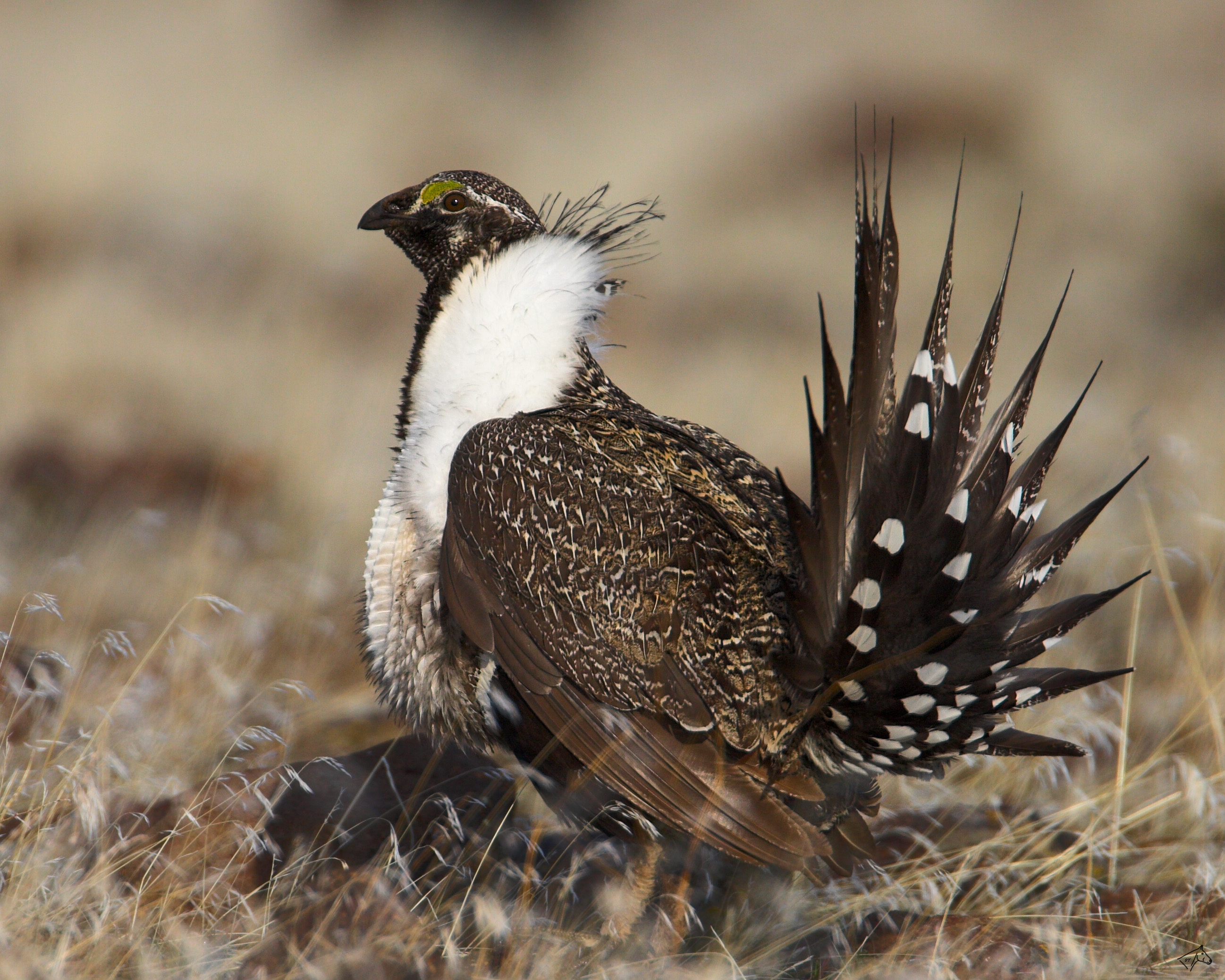
Greater Sage Grouse

Dwindling sage grouse populations have sparked heated debate over Wyoming's natural resource industry. The PAPA covers a large portion of the sage grouse's habitat. The area consists of about 200,000 acres of land, much of it covered with sagebrush, the grouse's landscape it requires to survive. The three largest operators in the PAPA are Ultra Resources, Shell Rocky Mountain Production, LLC and Questar Exploration and Production Company. Together these companies funded a five-year sage grouse study examining the impact of natural gas development on the birds' winter habitat, at a cost of $1.4 million. According to the Greater sage-grouse winter habitat selection 2009 report, the study results suggested that the sage grouse were avoiding industry activity areas with truck traffic, but not avoiding well sites with pipelines, or liquid gathering systems installed. A smaller operator in the PAPA, Devon Energy, reported that oil and gas companies pledged $60 million in 2007 to monitor the sage grouse and its habitat in the vicinities of their well sites.

Wyoming spent at least half a million dollars in 2010 solely to examine and redefine the map of the core areas of sage grouse habitat. In an August 2011 press release from the USDA, Agriculture secretary Tom Vilsack disclosed that an additional 21.8 million will be spent to conserve sage grouse habitat in the form of government subsidies to farmers.

Despite the sage grouse population having declined 90% in the past hundred years, and despite the loss of about half of their habitat in that same time, reports claim that efforts by state governments and the oil and gas industry have managed to keep the numbers stable, in localized areas, in the past decade. Those actions prevented the bird from being listed as endangered or threatened.

=== Wyoming toad ===
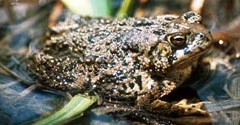
The Wyoming toad, Anaxyrus baxteri, an endangered toad that lives in Wyoming.

The Wyoming toad Anaxyrus baxteri (formerly known as Bufo baxteri), is an extremely rare amphibian restricted to the Albany County. The toad was initially considered a subspecies of the Canadian toad but found later to be a separate species. The adult is, on average, 2.2 inches in length and the color varies from brown to gray (often with a greenish tint) accompanied with darker blotches. A very distinctive feature of the species is the 'bony hump' between the eyes as a result of fused cranial crests. The toad was a common sight in the Laramie Basin up until the population crash that occurred in the mid-1970s. Originally, the toad occupied a geographical range of about 2330 km², and lived in floodplains or on shores of lakes & ponds, but eventually was only found at the Mortenson Lake National Wildlife Refuge. The species has been critically endangered since 1984 and became totally extinct in the wild in 1991 (also listed as such under the IUCN Red List of Endangered Species).

==== Causes of decline ====
The primary cause of the decline of the Wyoming toad is the chytrid fungus Batrachochytrium dendrobatidis (Bd), which is affecting amphibian populations worldwide. The fungus has been shown, in numerous studies, to cause disease in many different amphibian species and has been found in captive Wyoming Toad populations as well. Scientists have discovered through retrospective analysis that the fungus was present on the natural habitat of the Wyoming Toad as early as 1989 at least, and speculate that the fungus might have been responsible for the initial population crash, which still remains unknown. Other important environmental issues contributing to the decline include agro-chemicals that used on farms and ranches. Chemicals such as pesticides, herbicides, agricultural hormones and fertilizers, have been observed to directly alter the physiological development of the toads in some cases, and indirectly stress the amphibians, weakening their resistance to the Chrytrid fungus. Because chemicals are usually tested individually, the 'legal' dosages of many agro-chemicals, which were considered to be harmless before, are now observed to be rather dangerous in combination with one another or with other factors already present such as the Chytrid fungus. Habitat destruction and global climate change are also affecting the Wyoming Toad or other amphibian populations but to a somewhat lesser extent.

==== Ecological consequences ====
The first major concern with regards to the population decline is the possible extinction of the species. The species is not only totally extinct in the wild for 2 decades, but even its populations in captivity are also declining. Due to their low number, there is a rather elevated rate of inbreeding, making the gene pool of the population small, and decreasing the likelihood to evolve resistance against pathogens including the Chytrid fungus. Aside from the possible extinction of the toad, scientists are also worried that the population decline might lead to unforeseen chain effects in the ecosystem. Since the Wyoming Toad is an amphibian, which occupies a niche in both aquatic and terrestrial ecosystems, its absence might lead to trophic cascades in the ecosystem, such as its preys increasing in number and affecting other species. Amphibians such as the Wyoming Toad are furthermore good indicators of ecosystem health, and their disappearance would not only signify the degradation of the environment but would also render assessment of the natural habitats harder.

==== Conservation ====
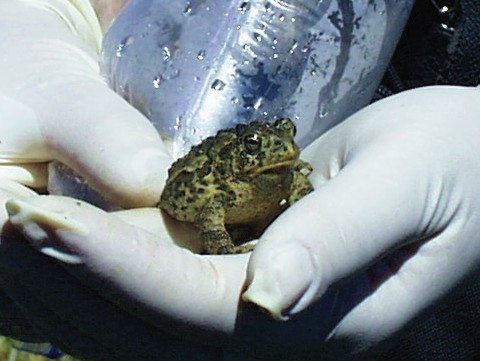
Wyoming Toad being examined by scientist.

Several agencies such as the Wyoming Game and Fish, the U.S. Fish and Wildlife Services, and the Cheyenne Mountain Zoo are currently working on saving the species. The primary focus is breeding the toad in captivity and releasing tadpoles in the wild as an attempt to restore the previous populations. No reproduction has been recorded in the wild so far, and it seems that the species are procreating successfully only in captivity. The reason why the Toads are not doing as well in nature remains unknown. Even though the species is protected under the Endangered Species Act, professionals working with the toad also argue that the situation is not well known enough to the public, and believe that the Wyoming Toads deserve more attention.

=== Habitat loss ===
The infrastructure of natural gas development includes wells, pipelines, roads, and other components that damage wildlife through direct habitat loss, deterioration of habitat and displacement. Population spikes associated with industry growth result in urban sprawl, as demand for living space increases, further reducing habitat available to wildlife. Additionally, road and pipeline construction divide habitat, resulting in greater automobile related fatalities.

Development of the Pinedale Anticline Project Area (PAPA) has impacted several species of big game dependent on western Wyoming for winter habitat, most notably pronghorn, mule deer, elk, bighorn sheep and moose. Growth of the Pinedale Anticline gas field has also compromised winter habitat and mating grounds for the Greater Sage Grouse, a game bird species indigenous to western North America and present candidate for the endangered species list.

== See also ==
- Wyoming Department of Environmental Quality
