= Saratoga National Fish Hatchery =

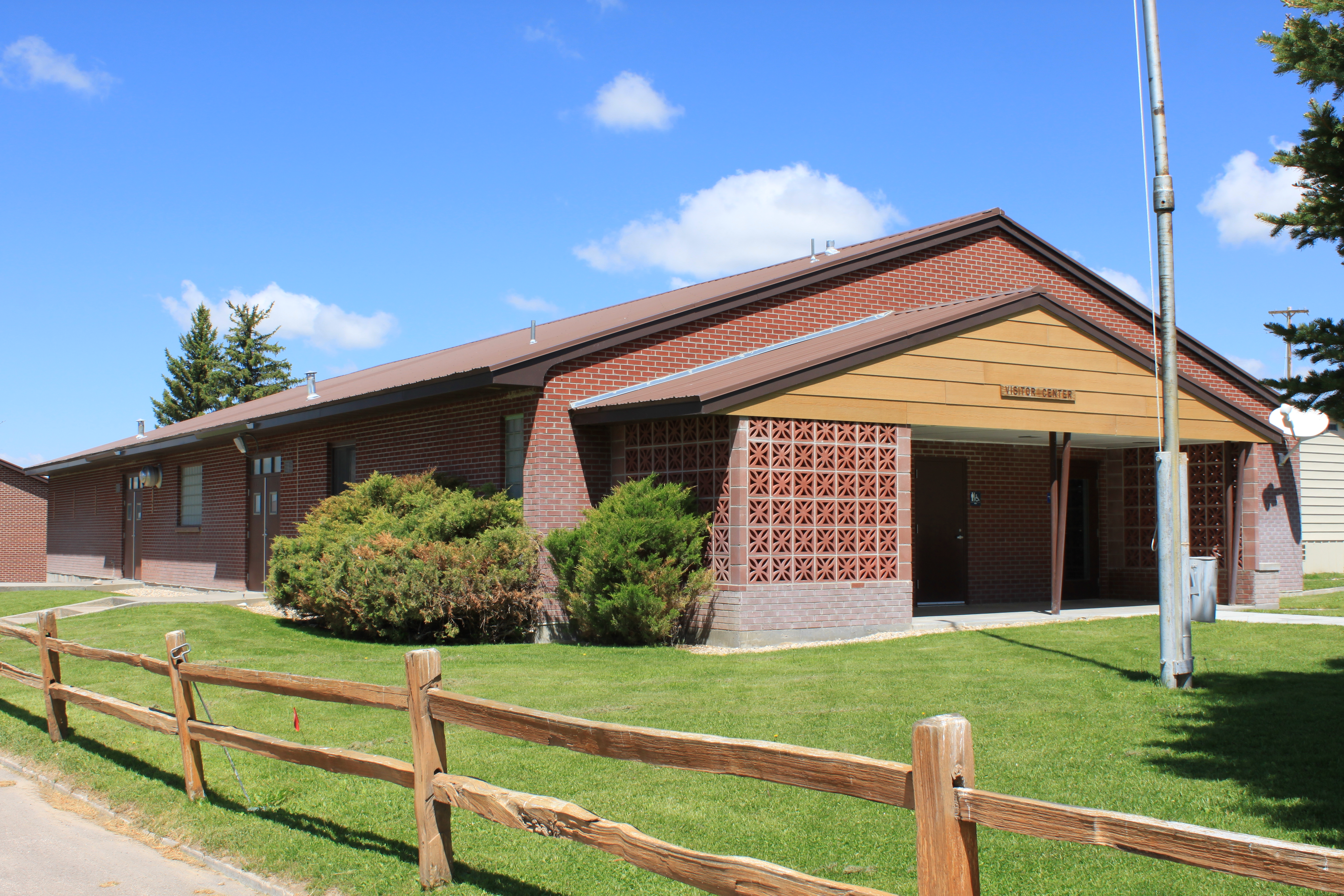
The Saratoga National Fish Hatchery visitor center

Saratoga National Fish Hatchery is part of the National Fish Hatchery System operated by the United States Fish and Wildlife Service. It is located northeast of Saratoga, Wyoming and, along with the Jackson National Fish Hatchery, is one of two National fish hatcheries operating in Wyoming. Saratoga NHF is primarily a broodstock hatchery; it maintains several healthy adults to produce sperm and eggs and distributes fertilized eggs to production hatcheries throughout the country to be hatched and grown to stockable sizes. It is also one of several organizations to establish a program for breeding Wyoming toads.

== History ==
The Saratoga NFH was established in 1911 and construction of its facilities began in March 1915. It was originally established to meet stock demands in Wyoming and to be expanded as the state grew. While it had maintained a wide variety of broodstock from its opening in 1915, Saratoga NFH was not officially designated a broodstock hatchery until 1966. The facilities of the Saratoga NFH were renovated and expanded in 1995 and 1996.

== Activities ==
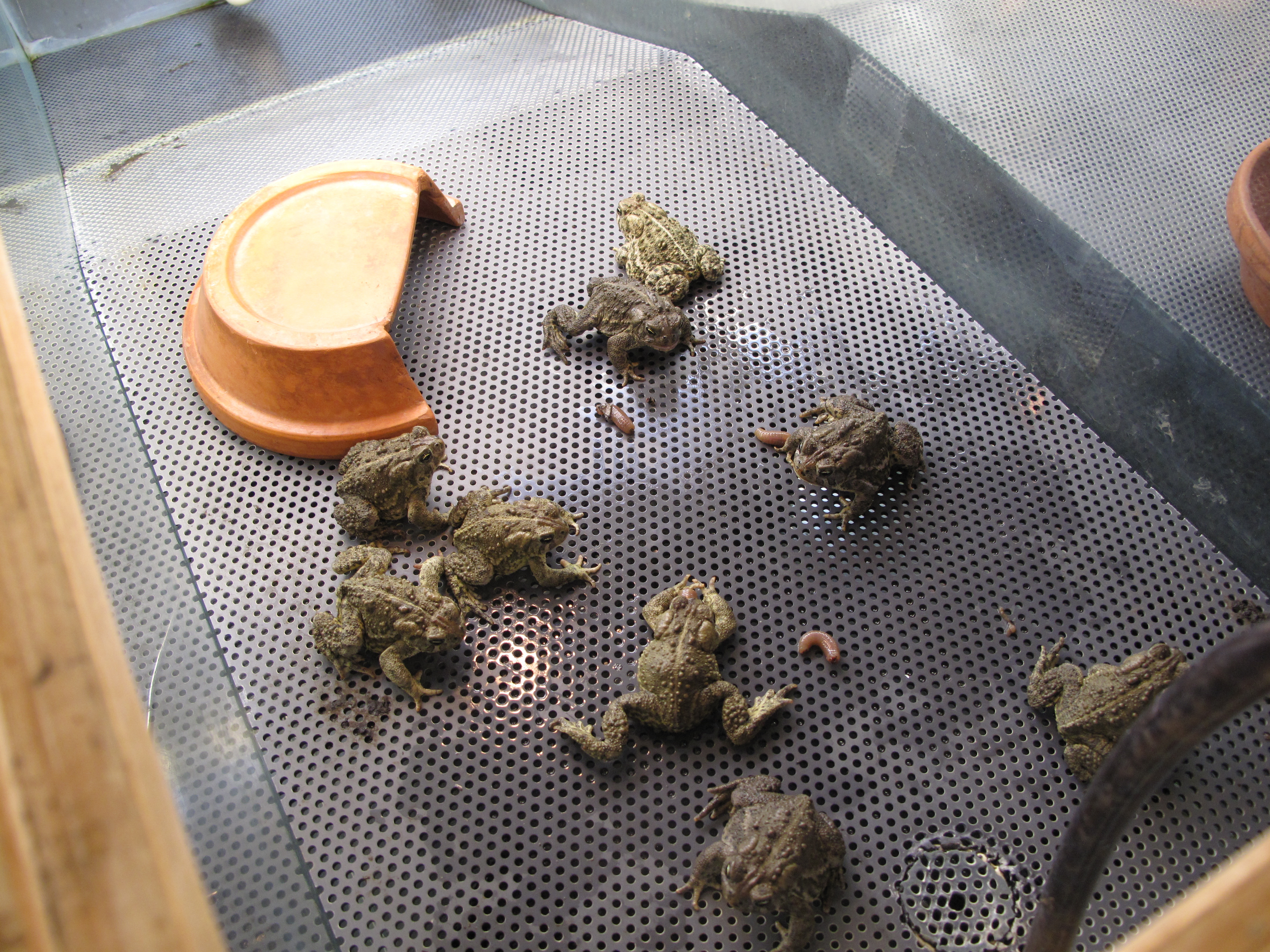
Wyoming toads at the Saratoga National Fish Hatchery

Saratoga NFH has broodstock for egg production of various subspecies of lake trout, brown trout, and rainbow trout. Saratoga NFH also rears Yellowstone cutthroat trout for stock in various federal and state parks and for tribal lands in Wyoming. Saratoga NFH produces Lewis lake trout eggs for the Great Lakes Restoration Project, Plymouth Rock brown trout for various hatcheries nationwide and holds backup broodstock for McConaughy rainbow trout.

Tagging studies show that 75 percent of trout caught from Lake Huron were produced by the Saratoga NFH.

Saratoga NFH was one of several hatcheries that had made efforts towards the reintroduction of greenback cutthroat trout in various lakes and rivers by 2002.

In 1997, Saratoga NFH began breeding Wyoming toads as refugia and for future reintroduction efforts. It was the first in the NFHS to use its resources to raise endangered amphibians. It has since supplied hundreds of adult toads to Mortenson Lake National Wildlife Refuge and other locations for reintroduction, including more than 900 adult toads in a single release in June 2016.
