= Christine Johnson =

Christine Johnson may refer to:

- Christine Johnson (Utah politician) (born 1968), member of the Utah House of Representatives
- Christine Johnson (actress) (1911–2010), actress and vocalist of the 1940s
- Christine J. Johnson (born 1953), member of the Illinois Senate
- Christine Kreuder Johnson, American epidemiologist and veterinary scientist

== See also ==
- Christine Jönsson (born 1958), Swedish politician
- Kristine Johnson (born 1972), American newscaster
- Kristina M. Johnson (born 1957), American engineer, executive and academic administrator
- Christina Johnston, English coloratura soprano
- Chris Johnson (disambiguation)
