= Christine Kreuder Johnson =

American epidemiologist and veterinary scientist

- Education: Duke University; University of Pennsylvania; University of California, Davis
- Scientific career
- Workplaces: University of California, Davis
- Thesis: Evaluation of survey methods used to assess distribution and abundance and characterization of patterns of mortality in southern sea otters (2003)

Christine Kreuder Johnson is an American epidemiologist and veterinary scientist who is Professor and Director of the EpiCenter for Disease Dynamics at the One Health Institute. She serves as Professor of Epidemiology and Ecosystem Health at the University of California, Davis. She was elected to the National Academy of Medicine and became a Fellow of the American Association for the Advancement of Science in 2021 for her novel research to investigate the epidemiology of zoonotic infectious diseases using One Health approaches, illuminate key animal-human interfaces that facilitate transmission of infectious diseases, and identify synergies for environmental stewardship to protect animal and human health.

== Early life and education ==
Johnson was an undergraduate student at Duke University, where she studied zoology and political science. She moved to the University of Pennsylvania for veterinary studies, where she earned a Veterinary Medicine Doctorate in 1994. She moved to the University of California, Davis, where she completed a Master of Preventive Veterinary Medicine. She earned a doctorate on effective methods to assess patterns of mortality in southern sea otters.

== Research and career ==
Johnson is the Director of the EpiCenter for Disease Dynamics at the One Health Institute. Her research looks to understand the impacts of environmental change on animal and human health. The findings of her research are used to inform public policy and better prepare for emerging threats. In particular, she is focused on identifying fault lines for disease emergence, spillover and spread. She had looked to understand the impact of the climate crisis on disease and the land-to-sea movement of pathogens. Johnson has continued to work on sea otters since her doctoral research, showing that long-term exposure to domoic acid can cause fatal heart disease. Domoic acid is produced in algal blooms that occur in unusually warm waters and then accumulate in crabs and clams.

Johnson's research has evaluated impacts to wildlife health and risks for zoonotic disease transmission at common animal-human interfaces . Her work investigates environmental drivers of disease transmission and she develops One Health approaches to emerging and re-emerging infectious disease surveillance and risk mitigation. Johnson research has showed that domesticated animals share the highest number of viruses with humans, and that species threatened by hunting and decreases in habitat quality host twice as many zoonotic viruses as those endangered for other reasons.

In August 2020, with support from the National Institute of Allergy and Infectious Diseases, Johnson established the EpiCenter for Emerging Infectious Disease Intelligence (EpiCenter), one of 10 Centers for Research in Emerging Infectious Diseases. The EpiCenter collaborates with scientists working on emerging infectious disease research in Uganda and Peru to investigate zoonotic disease transmission using One Health approaches to surveillance and outbreak investigations.

== Awards and honors ==
- 2023 U.S. Science Envoy, Office of Science and Technology Cooperation, U.S. Department of State, Washington, DC
- 2021 Elected to the National Academy of Medicine (NAM)
- 2021 Elected as Fellow to the American Association for Advancement of Science (AAAS)
- 2018 Public Policy Faculty Fellowship Award, American Association of Veterinary Medical Colleges
- 2017 Academic Senate Distinguished Scholarly Public Service Award, University of California, Davis
- 2016 Chair of the Faculty, School of Veterinary Medicine, University of California, Davis
- 2012 Distinguished Faculty Teaching Award, School of Veterinary Medicine, University of California, Davis

== Selected publications ==
- M.A. Miller; I.A. Gardner; C. Kreuder; et al. (July 1, 2002). "Coastal freshwater runoff is a risk factor for Toxoplasma gondii infection of southern sea otters (Enhydra lutris nereis)". International Journal for Parasitology. 32 (8): 997–1006. doi:10.1016/s0020-7519(02)00069-3. ISSN 0020-7519. PMID 12076629. Wikidata Q43216100.
- P A Conrad; M A Miller; C Kreuder; et al. (October 1, 2005). "Transmission of Toxoplasma: clues from the study of sea otters as sentinels of Toxoplasma gondii flow into the marine environment". International Journal for Parasitology. 35 (11–12): 1155–1168. doi:10.1016/j.ijpara.2005.07.002. ISSN 0020-7519. PMID 16157341. S2CID 6085011. Wikidata Q34450264.
- C Kreuder; M A Miller; D A Jessup; et al. (July 2003). "Patterns of mortality in southern sea otters (Enhydra lutris nereis) from 1998-2001". Journal of Wildlife Diseases. 39 (3): 495–509. doi:10.7589/0090-3558-39.3.495. ISSN 0090-3558. PMID 14567210. Wikidata Q28211015.
