= Wyoming Department of Environmental Quality =

State agency of Wyoming

The Wyoming Department of Environmental Quality (DEQ) founded in 1973, is a Wyoming state agency to protect, conserve and enhance the environment of Wyoming "through a combination of monitoring, permitting, inspection, enforcement and restoration/remediation activities". It consists of 6 divisions and since 1992, the Environmental Quality Council (EQC), a separate operating agency of 7 governor-appointed members.

Pressing issues have included since 2002 effects of Wyoming's rapidly expanding mineral and energy industries, such as natural gas production, fracking, oil refining, coal mining and uranium mining, including coalbed methane water management.

== History ==
The Wyoming Legislature founded the Department of Environmental Quality (DEQ) in 1973 in passing the Environmental Quality Act.

In 2000, the Wyoming legislature enacted the "Voluntary Remediation of Contaminated Sites" law establishing a voluntary remediation program . Two memoranda of agreement from March 14, 2002 define how the DEQ and EPA Region 8 interact regarding contaminated sites: The Resource Conservation and Recovery Act Memorandum of Agreement and the Comprehensive Environmental Response, Compensation, and Liability Act (CERCLA) Memorandum of Agreement.

== Responsibilities ==
DEQ enforces state and federal environmental laws, including the Clean Air Act, Clean Water Act, National Pollutant Discharge Elimination System (NPDES), Resource Conservation and Recovery Act (RCRA), Superfund Amendments and Title III Reauthorization Act (SARA), Surface Mining Control and Reclamation Act of 1977 and the Wyoming Environmental Quality Act. Enforcement covers more than 17.5 million acres of public lands and 40.7 million acres of federal mineral estate, administered by the Bureau of Land Management

== Organization ==
As of 2012, the DEQ's Director has been Todd Parfitt, appointed by Matt Mead, incumbent Republican Governor of Wyoming; from 2003 until 2012 the Director had been John Corra. In 1992, Wyoming reorganized all state agencies that deal with natural resources, and the legislature declared the EQC to be a separate operating agency. There are also two Governor-appointed, Wyoming Senate-confirmed independent entities: the Environmental Quality Council (EQC) and the Industrial Siting Council.

Apart from its administration with an Office of Outreach and Environmental Assistance the DEQ has six divisions: abandoned mine land, air quality, industrial siting which includes wind turbines, land quality for permitting/licensing of surface and underground mines, solid waste and hazardous waste, and water quality. The public can input through four advisory boards: a state land & investment board, an advisory board for air quality, one for water and waste, and one for land quality.

As of 2010, DEQ had 267 employees located in Sheridan, Lander, Casper, Rock Springs, Pinedale, and headquarters in Cheyenne, with a state budget cut at that time between 5 and 10 percent. The Wyoming state budget appropriations for the biennium from July 1, 2014, to June 30, 2016 foresaw only 264 employees. As of 2009, 74 employees conducted nearly 2,900 inspections. The DEQ has requested more inspectors since 2003, and requests were defeated "with the obvious desire not to know what's going on" per former Democratic Wyoming House Representative Pete Jorgensen.

=== Environmental Quality Council (EQC) ===
The EQC has 7 members, and per statutes not more than four members can be of the same political party. In 2014 the EQC had a Republican majority. As of April 2016, the members have been:

Name	Residence	Party affiliation	Term expires
Rich Fairservis, Secretary	Natrona County, Wyoming	Republican	March 2015, extended to March 2021
Meghan O'Toole Lally	Savery in Carbon County	Democrat	March 2017
David Bagley, Chairman	Albany County	Democrat	March 2016, extended to March 2020
Megan Degenfelder	Campbell County, Wyoming	Republican	March 1, 2020
Tim Flitner	Greybull in Big Horn County	Republican	March 2015 extended to March 1, 2019
Nick Agopian	Laramie in Albany County	(U)	March 1, 2019
Aaron Clark	Wheatland, Wyoming in Platte County	Independent	March 1, 2017

As of 2014, Rich Fairservis has been the CEO of Granite Peak Development, Wyomings largest developer, which built a crude-to-rail facility in 2014.

As of 2013, Nick Agopian has been employed by Devon Energy as a government and regulatory specialist.

As of 2012, David Bagley headed the Chemical and Petroleum Engineering Department at the University of Wyoming.

As of 2013, Meghan O'Toole Lally was a 5th generation sheep and cattle rancher.

As of 2015, Megan Degenfelder has been a spokeswoman for the coal producer Cloud Peak Energy.

As of 2016, Tim Flitner is a 5th generation cattle rancher at Diamond Tail ranch.

As of 2016, Aaron Clark was an environmental consultant for oil and gas development and filed natural resource permits for the Federal Energy Regulatory Commission (FERC) and as of 2015 was former Wyoming Game and Fish Commissioner.

==== Former members ====
Thomas Coverdale, Republican from Daniel until March 2016 and former chairman F. David Searle, Republican from Sheridan until March 2015. When his membership was extended and he became Chairmanin 2016 Fairservis moved from Casper to Natrona count.

=== Industrial Siting Council ===
It inputs into the Industrial Siting Division. As of April 2016 it has the following members, which like EQC has 7 members, and per statutes not more than four members can be of the same political party:

Name	Residence	Party affiliation	Term expires
Peter Brandjord	Green River in Sweetwater County	Democrat	March 2017
John Corra	Cheyenne in Laramie county	Republican	March 2019
James Miller	Sundance in Crook county	Republican	March 2019
Richard O'Gara	Cheyenne in Laramie county	Democrat	March 2017
Shawn Warner, Chair	Jackson in Park County	Republican	March 2021
Ken Lantta	Casper in Natrona county	Republican	March 2021
Sandy Shuptrine	Teton County	Democrat	March 2021

Corra has been an executive in the mineral and chemical industries, as of 2015 consulting for FMC Corporation per the Wyoming University.

Miller has been Special Assistant, Vice President of Academic Affairs at Laramie County Community College.

O'Gara retired from teaching economics at Laramie college and owns a business offering business siting and impact analyses (Wyoming Center for Business & Economic Analysis).

As of 2015, Sandy Shuptrine chaired the Teton County Conservation District. and was the lone dissenter in approving an ammonia production plant in Rock Springs by Simplot, because it was only 30% designed and contained only a single sentence about potential environmental releases.

Peter Brandjord said in 2014 "that Simplot's proposal was one of the best applications he had seen". As of 2000 he was Chairman of the Wyoming Retirement System Board.

Kenneth Lantta owns KDL Consulting, and has worked for the oil and gas industry (Precision Drilling Company, L.P. Wyoming oil & gas industry safety alliance).

==== Former members ====
As of 2002, former member Greg Bierei was employed with the Thunder Basin Coal Company, L.L.C., operating the Black Thunder Mine as engineering/environmental manager per an accident investigation. A much earlier member of the Council under Governor Stan Hathaway was Jackson Hole architect Vince Lee who served for three terms in the late 70s.

=== Division of air quality ===
Wyoming is divided into four air quality regions. As of 2014 the most strictly regulated area is Sublette County, which contain the two natural gas fields of Jonah Field and Pinedale Anticline Project Area (PAPA). In 2013, 80 percent of the oil drilling permits issued by the Wyoming Interstate Oil and Gas Compact Commission were in Sublette County and four other counties (Campbell County, Converse County, Johnson County and Laramie County).

In the Upper Green River Basin with parts of Sublette, Lincoln County and Sweetwater County companies with multiple-well developments must place pollution controls from the beginning of operations, while single-well developments only need to install them if they emit more than four tons of volatile organic compounds (VOCs) annually.

In the 'Concentrated Development Area', comprising all of Carbon County, Fremont County, Natrona County and Uinta County and parts of Lincoln County, Wyoming and Sweetwater County, multi-well developments need pollution controls from the beginning, but single-well facilities may emit up to eight tons of VOC's per year.

In the so-called 'state region' of all remaining counties, there is a VOC limit of 10 tons annually for all types of well developments, lowered from 20 tons per year only in 2007.

In December 2013, the DEQ issued the city of Medicine Bow a permit for construction of a coal gasification plant. In 2011, the Sierra Club challenged the permit, and lost before the Wyoming Supreme Court.

==== Non attainment ====
Between 2008 and 2011, Pinedale had such high ozone levels, that the U.S. Environmental Protection Agency declared it a nonattainment area. For attainment, "the area must have three years where the fourth-highest ozone level falls below the national standard". The American Lung Association gave the area a failing grade for ozone levels.

A Wyoming Department of Health's public health investigation from 2008 to 2011 found associations between short-term changes in ground-level ozone and acute respiratory problems among residents seeking healthcare within Sublette County. The Northern Arapahos and Eastern Shoshone tribes sought "state status" in order to administer air quality monitoring. In 2013 the EPA ruled on the request and determined the land actually belongs to the Wind River Indian Reservation and has for more than a century, despite a 1905 law opening it to non-tribal members.

=== Division of land quality ===
The DLQ has a permitting and licensing site for coal, and one for noncoal, including uranium. In 2013, a DEQ feasibility study estimated that it would cost Wyoming at least $4.5 million and 1o new staff to take over regulation of uranium and thorium mining. The mining industry has pushed the state to take over, saying the Nuclear Regulatory Commission charges too much and moves too slowly.

==== Mine reclamation ====
The Land Quality Division enforces the federal Surface Mining Control and Reclamation Act of 1977's obligation on mining companies to guaranty they can pay the costs of mine reclamation. Wyoming does not require large mining companies to post a surety bond. Instead, these companies can hold their own assets as "self-bonding". The bankruptcy of large coal mining companies may imperil the $2.2 billion the DEQ has allowed in self-bonding.

After Arch Coal declared bankruptcy, the DEQ agreed to accept $75 million in place of the company's $486 million in self-bonding liability. After Alpha Natural Resources declared bankruptcy, the DEQ agreed to accept $61 million in place of the company's $411 million in self-bonding liability. On March 28, 2016 the DEQ assured the federal Office of Surface Mining that Peabody Energy's self-bonding remained adequate. Before Peabody Energy declared bankruptcy on April 13, it held $1.47 billion in self-bonding liabilities, including $900.5 million in Wyoming alone.

=== Voluntary Remediation Program (VRP) ===
As of 3 January 2014 "more than 200" contaminated sites are part of the VRP. The program lists 18 abandoned and contaminated sites, also known as orphan sites, 17 of which affect the groundwater. As of April 3, 2014, there were 9 active orphan sites, 4 of them in Cheyenne, including the Cheyenne Perchloroethylene (PCE) Plume Orphan Site, the Casper PCE Plume Orphan Site, the Laramie PCE Plume Orphan Site, the Deluxe Cleaners and Tailors PCE and VOC Orphan Site and the former Lobell Refinery Orphan Site, as well as 9 inactive orphan sites.

After a well blowout by Windsor Energy Corp near Clark, Wyoming in August 2006, which forced evacuations and took nearly 56 hours to plug with drilling mud, liquid gas condensate and natural gas were released through a cracked well casing 255 feet below ground. On January 12, 2007 the DEQ water quality division issued a notice of violation; the company settled in August 2007 by promising to participate in the 'Voluntary Remediation Program' and paid a $2,812.50 fine. Monitoring wells showed groundwater contamination, but didn't include residential areas. In 2007, elevated levels of benzene in one private water well sped up the 2009 clean up schedule; Windsor had to deliver a clean up plan to the DEQ by May 1, 2008. Not until 2010 did residents learn about the plan. In May 2011, Windsor presented a final remedy draft to Clark residents in a public meeting, where residents criticized lack of monitoring private wells and "some expressed frustration with Wyoming state laws that they feel favor industry over personal property rights", and where "county and the state both work together, and they're all extremely pro industry".

One year prior, Windsor Energy Group LLC had dumped at least 200 barrels of fluids from its Bennett Creek site near Clark, with the permission of the property owner and was fined about $5,000.

== Budget ==
The 2014 budget appropriated US$142,904,296 to DEQ. Half the budget, or $74,500,000, went to the Agency of Abandoned mine reclamation. The second largest post was for water quality at $23,276,958, followed by $17,155,165 for air quality.

== See also ==
- Environmental issues in Wyoming
