= Beth S. Williams =

American wildlife veterinarian (1951–2004)

Elizabeth Storm Williams (November 15, 1951 – December 29, 2004) was an American wildlife veterinarian. She discovered chronic wasting disease and is also credited with preventing the extinction of the black-footed ferret.

== Early life and education ==
Elizabeth Storm Williams was born November 15, 1951, in Columbia, Missouri, to parents Martha Storm Williams and Walter F. Williams. Her father was a researcher at the University of Maryland, and one of her early jobs was working in his lab. She received her bachelor's degree in zoology from University of Maryland, College Park. She graduated with a Doctor of Veterinary Medicine from Purdue University in 1977. She then went to Colorado State University, where she completed a residency training program and PhD in veterinary pathology.

== Career ==
Williams discovered chronic wasting disease (CWD) in 1978, identifying it as a form of transmissible spongiform encephalopathy, and was later recognized as the foremost expert on CWD in deer and elk in the US. She and her husband are credited with preventing the extinction of black-footed ferrets. She also researched the diseases brucellosis, which affects animals like cattle and elk, and chytridiomycosis, which affects amphibians.

She was part of the Wildlife Disease Association for more than twenty-five years, serving on many committees within the group, including as chair of its Student Activities Committee and Public Awareness Committee. She served on the editorial board of the Journal of Wildlife Diseases, and was made its Editor in 2000.

Williams was also an instructor, teaching at the University of Wyoming and Colorado State University. She was additionally on several national councils, including for the FDA, United States National Research Council, and National Academy of Medicine, as an expert on spongiform encephalopathies.

== Personal life ==
Beth Williams married Edwin Thomas (Tom) Thorne, who was also a wildlife veterinarian, in 1980. Williams and Thorne have been called "one of the most productive husband-and-wife collaborations in the history of American conservation".

== Death ==
Williams and her husband, Tom Thorne, died in a car accident in northern Colorado on December 29, 2004. She was 53.

== Awards and honors ==
In 1996, she was awarded the Wildlife Disease Association's Distinguished Service Award, which is its highest honor, and in 1999 received the Wyoming Game Warden Association's award. In 2005, Williams was inducted into the Wyoming Outdoor Hall of Fame.

Williams and her husband are the namesake of the Tom Thorne/Beth Williams Wildlife Habitat Management Area in Wyoming, as well as the Tom Thorne and Beth Williams Wildlife Research Center at Sybille, one of a few wildlife research centers in the US.
