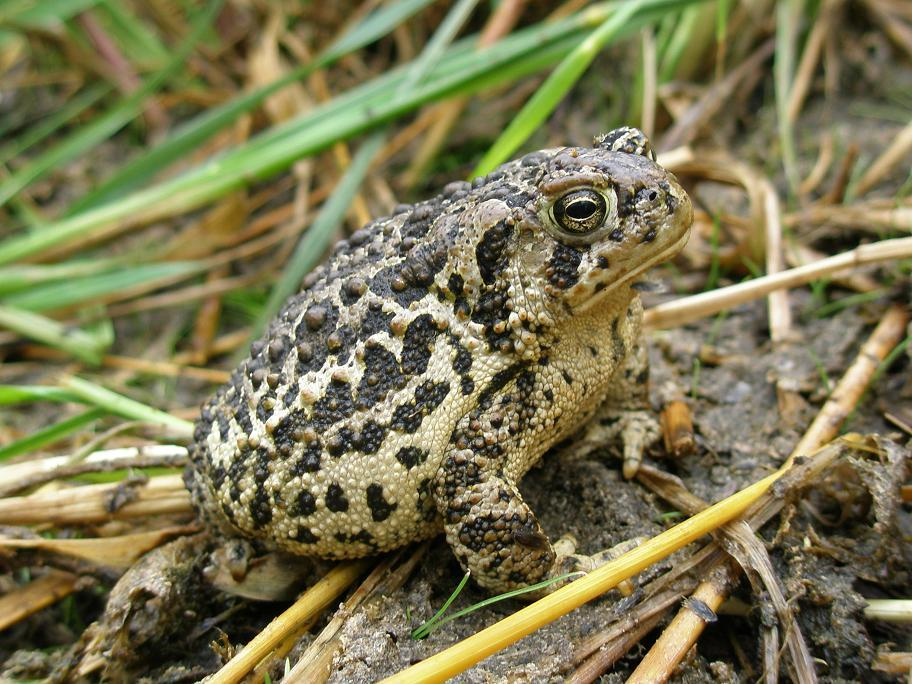

Conservation status
- Extinct in the Wild (IUCN 3.1)

- Critically Imperiled (NatureServe)

Scientific classification
- Kingdom: Animalia
- Phylum: Chordata
- Class: Amphibia
- Order: Anura
- Family: Bufonidae
- Genus: Anaxyrus
- Species: A. baxteri

Binomial name
- Anaxyrus baxteri (Porter, 1968)
- Geographic distribution in Wyoming

Synonyms
- Bufo hemiophrys baxteri Porter, 1968; Bufo baxteri — Packard, 1971; Anaxyrus baxteri — Frost et al., 2006; Bufo (Anaxyrus) baxteri — Fouquette & Dubois, 2014

= Wyoming toad =

Species of amphibian

The Wyoming toad (Anaxyrus baxteri), also known commonly as Baxter's toad, is a species of toad in the family Bufonidae. The Wyoming toad is an extremely rare amphibian that exists only in captivity and within Mortenson Lake National Wildlife Refuge in Wyoming in the United States. The Wyoming toad was listed as an endangered species in 1984, and listed as extinct in the wild since 1991. As with black-footed ferrets at the Tom Thorne and Beth Williams Wildlife Research Center at Sybille in Wheatland, Wyoming, the effort to save the Wyoming toad has been a cooperative effort among state and federal agencies and private landowners.

The Wyoming toad was common from the 1950s through the early 1970s, but its distribution was limited to the Laramie Basin in Albany County. The population crashed around 1975 and was extremely low by 1980. The Wyoming toad was federally listed as endangered in January 1984.

To prevent extinction, a captive-breeding program began in 1989 at the Thorne Williams Unit that produced enough offspring in its first few years to supply seven zoos, and in 1998 the Saratoga National Fish Hatchery received captive-breeding stock. Nearly 46,000 offspring were produced at the Thorne Williams Unit from 1995 until 2006, when the remaining captive stock was moved to the Red Buttes Environmental Biology Laboratory south of Laramie, and then released back into the wild. Before the sharp declines occurred, this toad had been originally classified as Bufo hemiophrys baxteri, a subspecies of the Canadian toad, by Kenneth Raymond Porter in 1968.

== Etymology ==
The specific name, baxteri, is in honor of American zoologist George T. Baxter who discovered the relict population.

== History ==
The Wyoming toad, common until the 1950s, became significantly fewer in number in the late 1970s, especially between the years between 1975 and 1978. In 1980, experts estimated that there were approximately 25 individuals remaining in the wild. Before this sharp decline in population, the Wyoming toad was commonly found in the floodplains, ponds, shallow lakes and seepage pools within the Laramie Basin located in Albany County, Wyoming. Researchers have noted that the species had been found to be abundant in the region since 1952. However, researchers noticed that the population of the Wyoming toad had decreased significantly beginning in 1975. The toad's extreme rarity, documented between 1976 and 1978, revealed no remaining wild populations.

== Characteristics ==
The Wyoming toad is dark brown, gray or green, with small dark markings on its underside. It carries small, rounded, blotchy warts on its dorsal surface as well as blurry light lines. The male toad has a dark throat. The individual toads can be identified by the variation in their skin colors and wart patterns. The toad can grow up to 5.6 cm (2.2 in) in length, and females grow slightly larger than males. It also has sensitive skin that has low adaptability and is prone to permitting infection by chytrid fungus, a strong threat to the Wyoming toad. The toad cannot handle rapid climate change and cannot adapt to differing amounts of water irrigation or diverged irrigation. The toad is mainly active at night and has very poor eyesight; it relies on the movement of its prey to hunt.

== Habitat ==
The Wyoming toad frequents floodplains and the short grass edges of ponds, creeks and lakes. The species frequently uses abandoned pocket gopher and ground squirrel burrows as hibernacula.

Habitat typical characteristics may be seen to vary along the Wyoming toad's age spectrum. Studies at Mortensen Lake in Albany County show that adult Wyoming toads are attracted to habitats with greater vegetation while younger toads are more drawn to areas of lesser vegetation. Adults tend to drift further inland away from shorelines, while younger toads tend to settle closer to the shorelines. Though these habitat variations and substrate conditions varying accordingly, adults are located in areas with slightly cooler temperatures. For the typical adult, substrate surface temperatures were seen to be 20.31 °C (68.56 °F) versus 23.05 °C (73.49 °F) for younger specimens. Adult Wyoming toads demonstrate very little change in location. The measures of the toad's substrate surface temperature and distance from shorelines tend to be most accurate indicators of possible sightings. When surface temperatures exceed 20 °C (68 °F) and the shoreline is within one to two miles, optimal locating conditions are achieved.

== Behavior ==
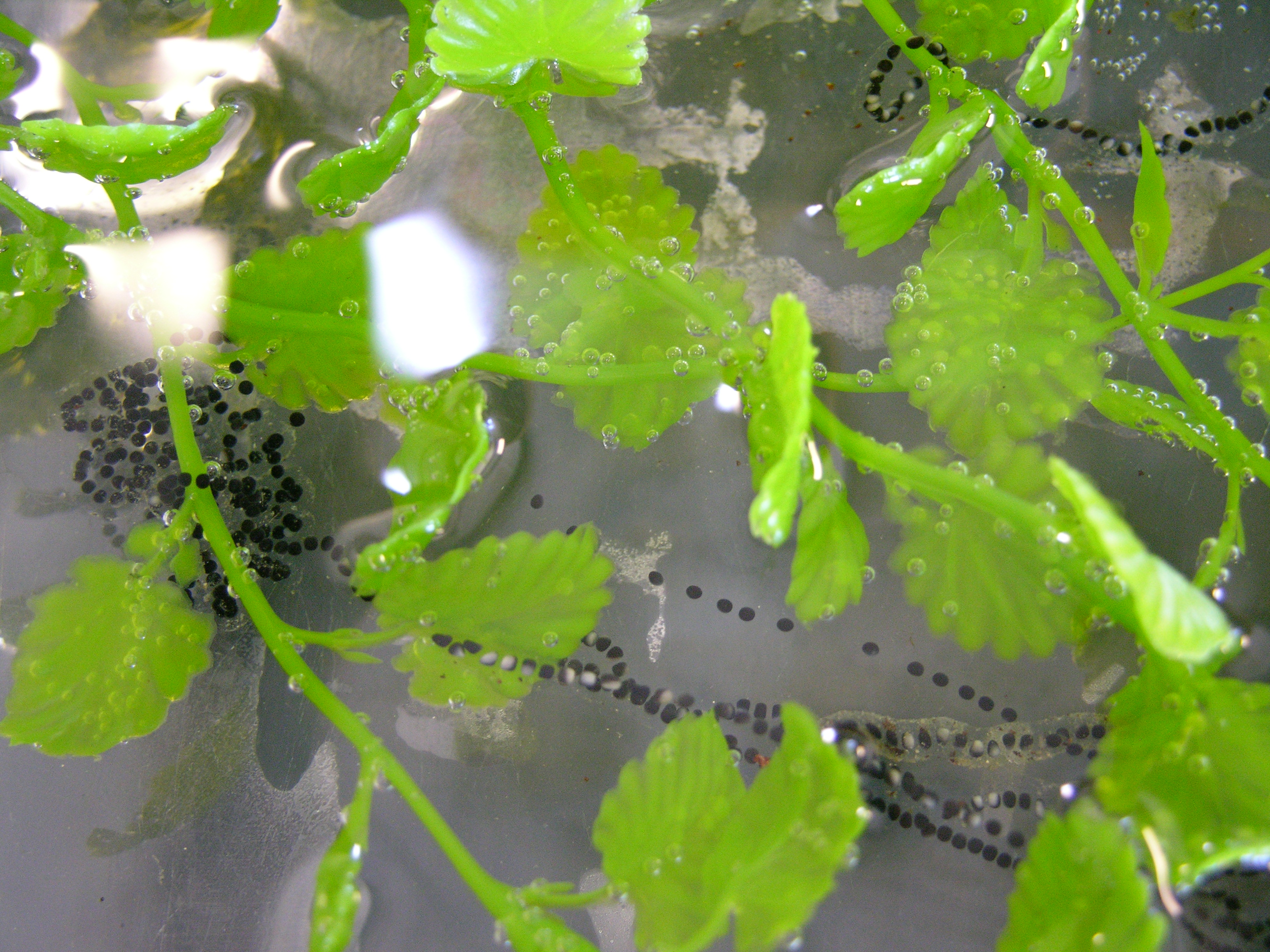
Eggs

Toads emerge from hibernation in early May to migrate to the north shore for mating. They return to the south shore by late September or early October for hibernation. The younger toads are active as long as one month later than are older toads, which gives them more time to store energy for hibernation and reduce intraspecific competition. The mating call of the Wyoming toad has a low frequency along with a slow pulse rate, but the duration is longer than that of other types of toads. Wyoming toads mature earlier, with males at only two years and females at three years, than other higher-elevation bufonids in their Wyoming habitat. Disease has played a major role in the decline of the Wyoming toad.

=== Reproduction ===
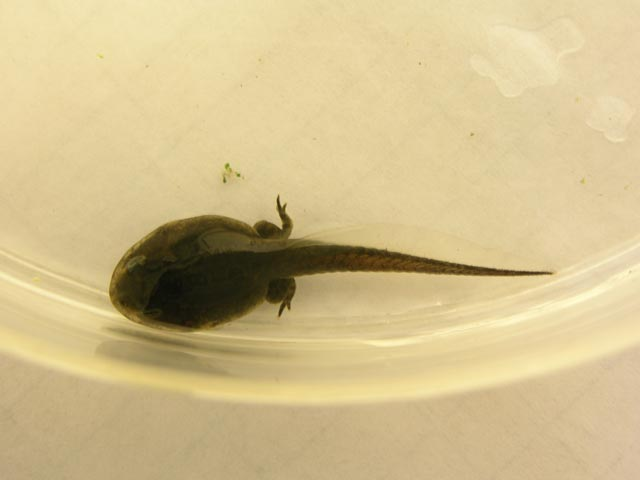
Wyoming toad tadpole

There are believed to be 100 Wyoming toads still living in the wild, and as a result, a recovery group was formed by the U.S. Fish and Wildlife Service's Saratoga National Fish Hatchery in 1998. The goal of this recovery group was to perform captive breeding and reintroduce tadpoles into the wild. However, the captive breeding program has seen low reproductive output because of low ovulation and fertilization rates. Female toads were given a dose of luteinizing hormone releasing hormone (LHRHa), which induces spawning in fish, while male toads were treated with human chorionic gonadotropin (hCG). IVF technology may also assist in the species' long-term genetic management. Extended "priming" of the Wyoming toad yielded higher fecundity and an increased number of eggs per toad was observed, as well as a greater rate of survival from fertilization to the swim-up stage. Studies have also found that higher water temperatures reduce the time to metamorphosis.

== Conservation ==
The Wyoming toad, common until its sharp decrease in population in the 1970s, was officially listed as endangered in January 1984. The toad's only known habitat was located within the Laramie Basin, 30 miles (48 km) from Laramie, Wyoming. The Wyoming toad was most often found along the shores of Mortenson Lake, located southwest of Laramie. This lake, a high-plains lake situated at 7,256 feet (2,212 m) above sea level, had maintained a healthy and reproductive population of Wyoming toads. However, recent research shows that the toad has become less procreative, possibly as the result of a red leg bacteria that was discovered in 1990.

The Wyoming Toad Recovery Group, formed in 1987, was established to help initiate a plan for recovery efforts and extended research. The group has primarily focused on monitoring and protecting the Laramie population and searching for additional habitats or other populations. It also maintains efforts to produce a healthy habitat for the existing toads and to establish a population in captivity. This captive population will enable researchers to understand the species' history and habitat needs. Wyoming's Game and Fish Department has also implemented measures, along with local landowners, to protect the existing Wyoming toad population. Other plans, including one coordinated with the mosquito control district, have helped to safeguard the existing habitat from potential side effects from chemicals and pesticides. The Sybille Wildlife Research Unit has developed a captive-rearing program through the Wyoming Game and Fish Department, and 16 toads were in captivity as of June 1991. Representatives from the U.S. Fish and Wildlife Service and the Wyoming Game and Fish Department form the Wyoming Toad Recovery Management Team, established to coordinate the implementation of recovery tasks. The service plans to establish five new toad populations, each consisting of 100 individuals, at a cost of $1.6 million (approximately $3,200 per toad).

Initially breeding captive Wyoming toads in 1989, the Sybille Wildlife Research Center implemented a more intensive captive-breeding program in 1993, utilizing 12 wild-caught individuals (now believed to have been the last of the Wyoming toad population). The program's efforts were very promising, yielding four egg masses that were found in 1998 at the Mortenson Lake release site, and two additional egg masses later found in 1999. Captive toads that had been released continued reproducing at Mortenson Lake. By the spring of 1998, the toad's reproductive calls could be heard for first time in the wild since 1993.

In 1997, the Saratoga National Fish Hatchery became the first federal hatchery to participate in the breeding of endangered amphibians. From 1993 to 2003, the two Wyoming toad-breeding facilities produced tadpoles and toadlets, all of which were released into either Mortenson Lake, Lake George (located at the nearby Hutton Lake National Wildlife Refuge) or a private release site. The typical method used for captive breeding is containment of six males and four females, housed in a 45-gallon aquarium. Inside the aquarium is a cork sponge mat for basking, a water tray and a variety of foods such as mealworms, waxworms and crickets. Hormonal induction of spermiation has been successfully used to increase overall production of eggs per individual and an increased survival rate of fertilized eggs to swimming stage.

Recent surveys conducted at Crescent Lake, Wyoming in 2011 suggest that some breeding is occurring in the wild.

Future conservation of the Wyoming toad in the wild is heavily dependent on eradicating chytrid fungus (Batrachochytrium dendrobatidis), which is perhaps the greatest threat to the species' survival. Research at Porter Lake in 2010 reported that chytrid infection among Wyoming toads affected about 41% of the population. A year later, the infection rate rose to 100%. This rate of infection is even seen with in captive breed populations. Surviving the chytrid infection is possible if toads manage to sufficiently dry themselves through frequent basking, thereby ridding themselves of the infection. Captive Wyoming toads have been placed in quarantine and monitored for signs of chytridiomycosis. Because of the sudden appearance of the disease, there is no standard protocol for treatment, but methods include submerging infected toads in itraconazole baths. Some toads survive longer but still succumb.

=== Issues in recovery ===
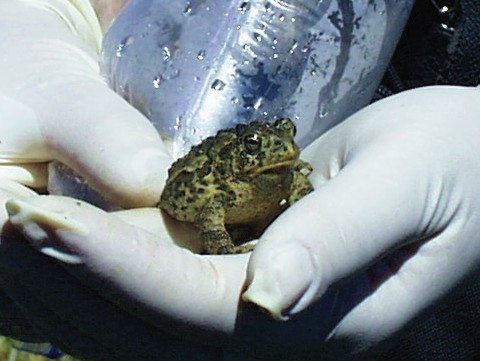
Wyoming toad being examined by FWS employee

Wyoming toads are found in western states such as Wyoming, and they are likely to be found in wet, damp areas and in or around lakes. In 1987, a single population of Wyoming toads was found in Albany County, Wyoming. The toads were collected for reproduction and researchers canvassed the area to collect any more toads that they could find. Researchers took the few surviving hatched eggs and reintroduced them back into Wyoming lakes. However, the lakes contain chytrid fungus, known for killing amphibians and a significant contributing factor in the high mortality of the Wyoming toad. The revival of these toads is dependent on annual supplementation and reproduction in captivity. However, Wyoming toads are becoming increasingly difficult to find in their habitat. In 1992, the governor of Wyoming created the Albany County Wyoming Toad Task Force to protect the Wyoming toad. The committee brought toads into captivity for reproduction, but only for a period of two years. After the group discontinued, the International Union for Conservation of Nature (IUCN) stepped in to save the toad, running field studies, captive breeding plans and tests on the diseases may be causing mortality. Through field notes, researchers Withers and Corn (2005) discovered that Wyoming toads tend to mature earlier than do other amphibians in their surrounding habitat. The scientists discovered that the average Wyoming toad did not live past one or two years, and the fungus was identified as the causal factor. Although captive breeding seems to offer hope for reviving the Wyoming toad population, it has its own pitfalls. Scientists who have captured species in order for them to breed have found that most captive animals do not live longer than three years, and amphibian breeding is most successful at that age. Captive breeding has not caused a significant rise in the population of Wyoming toads. The most common infections among the toad are bacterial and fungal infections. Scientists believe that the leading cause for the Wyoming toad's endangerment is chytrid fungus, which is impossible for the toads to avoid in their natural habitat. Another major reason for the failure of reviving the Wyoming toad population is that it is not a high priority movement; since the toad's discovery, there have been only three studies done between 1992 and 2005. Today, thanks to a 30-year collaboration between the state, federal agencies, landowners, non-profits and the University of Wyoming, there are about 1,500 Wyoming toads in existence.

=== Other causes of population decline ===
- Normal disease: Wyoming toads have a shorter life span than those of other toad species, and they are very vulnerable to infectious diseases, especially the chytrid fungus that was found at Mortenson Lake in 2000–2001. Their environment is conducive to the spread of other infectious fungi and bacteria (such as Aeromonas hydrophila). The cause of death in the majority of wild and captive toads from 1989 until 1996 appeared to be caused by the fungus Basidiobolus ranarum.
- Malathion: Within the Wyoming toad's habitat, malathion has been used to control the mosquito population. The combination of malathion and bacterial (Aeromonas hydrophila) infection could be causing increased mortality rates.
- Increased irrigation and water shortages: Increased irrigation has reduced the extent and quality of the floodplain wetlands where the toad has formerly resided. New wetland habitat has been created by flood irrigation and the construction of reservoirs. However, in dry years when junior water rights are not met, less irrigation water flows through Pioneer Canal, and Mortenson Lake collects less seepage, causing reduced flooding in riparian areas and decreased wetland quality.
- Natural predation: Toads are the prey of many avian and mammalian species at all life stages. demonstrated that in Colorado, salamanders prey on boreal toad eggs.
- Weather: Changing weather conditions and water levels can affect the survival of tadpoles. For example, during the fall of 1988, 450 juvenile toads were observed at Mortenson Lake. That winter, the basin was subject to extreme cold weather (Jennings et al. 2001). No yearlings were found in the spring of 1989, indicating that the cold snap had affected the survival rates of young toads.

== In popular culture ==
In 2023, the Wyoming toad was featured on a United States Postal Service forever stamp as part of the Endangered Species set, based on a photograph from Joel Sartore's Photo Ark. The stamp was dedicated at a ceremony at the National Grasslands Visitor Center in Wall, South Dakota.
