= Christopher Johnston =

Christopher Johnston may refer to:

- Christopher Johnston (anatomist) (1822–1891), American surgeon and professor of anatomy, father of the Assyriologist
- Christopher Johnston (Assyriologist) (1856–1914), American physician and Assyriologist, scholar of ancient Mesopotamia, son of the surgeon-anatomist
- Christopher Johnston, Lord Sands (1857–1934), judge and Unionist Party (Scotland) Member of Parliament
- Chris Johnston (footballer) (born 1994), Scottish footballer
- Chris Clavin (Christopher Johnston, born 1979), musician and record label owner

== See also ==
- Chris Johnson (disambiguation)
