= Priscilla Susan Bury =

British botanist and artist (1799–1872)

- Born: Priscilla Susan Falkner; 12 January 1799; Liverpool, England
- Died: 8 March 1872 (aged 73); Croydon, England
- Other name: Mrs Edward Bury
- Occupations: Botanist and Illustrator
- Spouse: Edward Bury

Priscilla Susan Bury, born Falkner (12 January 1799 – 8 March 1872), was an English botanist and illustrator.

== Personal life ==
Priscilla Susan Bury was born in Rainhill, Liverpool. Her parents were Edward Falkner and Bridget (née Tarleton) Falkner. Bury grew up in Lancashire, England and was the daughter of a rich Liverpool merchant whose estate resided outside the city at Fairfields. Bury’s childhood home contained a lush garden with many rare and exotic plants. Growing up, Bury drew each plant species that held her interest and claimed that she was "raised in the greenhouses of her family home” which was later demolished in 1913. As a young woman she was an enthusiastic botanist and flower painter and was particularly interested in lilies and similar allied flowers. She had no pretensions as to scientific knowledge and, in effect, was a very talented amateur that created aquatint engravings with original hand-coloring. By 1829, (age 30) she had produced a number of paintings of hexandrian plants, which she wished to publish and later became a venture promoted by her friend, William Swainson.

On 4 March 1830 Falkner married Edward Bury F.R.S. (1794-1858), a wealthy and ingenious railway engineer and would later bear three sons between 1831 and 1835. Between 1852 and 1860 the family lived at Hillsborough Hall near Sheffield and later moved to Croft Lodge, Ambleside in the Lake District.

In 1860 she published an account of her husband, Recollections of Edward Bury, Fellow of the Royal Society, Member of the institute of Civil Engineers, Member of the Smeatonian Society, Fellow of the Royal Astronomical Society, Fellow of the Royal Historic Society by his widow.

Between 1852 and 1860 the family lived at Hillsborough Hall near Sheffield and later moved to Croft Lodge, Ambleside in the Lake District. By 1866 she was living at Fairfield, Thornton Heath, Croydon. She died at Fairfield on 8 March 1872 (age 73) of bronchitis and cerebral congestion in Croydon, England. Bury's body is in St. Mary's Churchyard in Scarborough, North Yorkshire.

== Artistic work ==
Although she was not trained as a botanist or commissioned as a professional artist, she was the author of several artistic and scientific plant illustrations

She began to draw plants from the glasshouse at her family home 'Fairfield', and by 1829 had enough studies of lilies and allied plants for publication. The 1829 Drawings of lilies, as lithographs by Hullmandel, features her illustrations accompanied by short notes. This was modelled on a book, and its publicity materials, by William Roscoe. She modeled her proposed book, then tentatively named ‘Drawings of lilies’, on William Roscoe's Monandrian Plants (1824–8), with the plates to be accompanied by brief letterpresses based on her notes and even used Roscoe's book prospectus as a model for her own. In it, she advertised her ‘Drawings of Liliaceous Plants arranged by Botanists in the genera Crinum, Amaryllis, Pancratium …’, to appear in ten numbers, each of five plates to be lithographed by Hullmandel, subscribers paying a guinea a number, others 27s.

In 1831 Priscilla Bury's drawings began to be published as 'A Selection of Hexandrian Plants', the large (64 cm × 48 cm) plates being engraved by Robert Havell; the work had only seventy-nine subscribers, and it is unlikely that the number produced was much beyond that, accounting for its scarcity, which is noted by both Stafleu and Cowan and Pritzel. Fifty-one plates appeared in ten fascicles, the last in 1834, but whether or not the text is Bury's is unclear. The plates are fine-grained aquatints, partly printed in color and retouched by hand... The published work has been praised as "certainly one of the most effective colour-plate folios of its period". The engraving was entrusted to the Londoner Robert Havell, engraver of the John James Audubon (1785-1851) plates. The book was carried out in aquatint and the 350 plant drawings painted in part by hand. The subscribers to this large folio numbered only 79, mostly from the Lancashire region, Audubon being one of them.

Her later work after 1836 consisted of eight plates for Maund and Henslow's The Botanist and photographs of her drawings were included in Figures of Remarkable Forms of Polycystins, or Allied Organisms, in the Barbados Chalk deposit in 1860–1861, followed by new expanded editions in 1865 and 1869. The first edition had been published by Bury through subscription, but subsequently attracted enough attention that the later editions were published commercially. The fossils had been collected by John Davy and prepared for microscopy by Christopher Johnson of Lancaster.

== Gallery ==
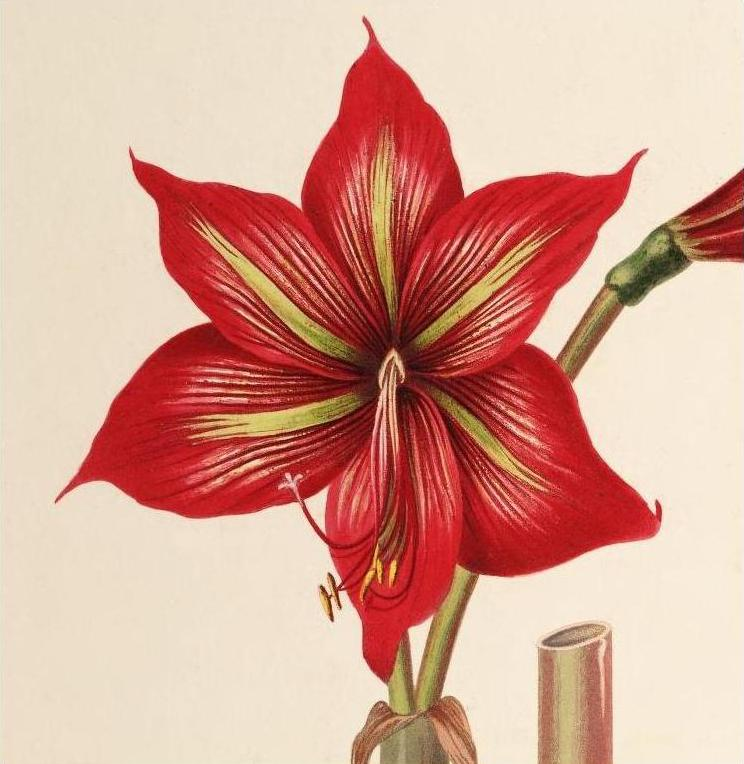
Hippeastrum correiense

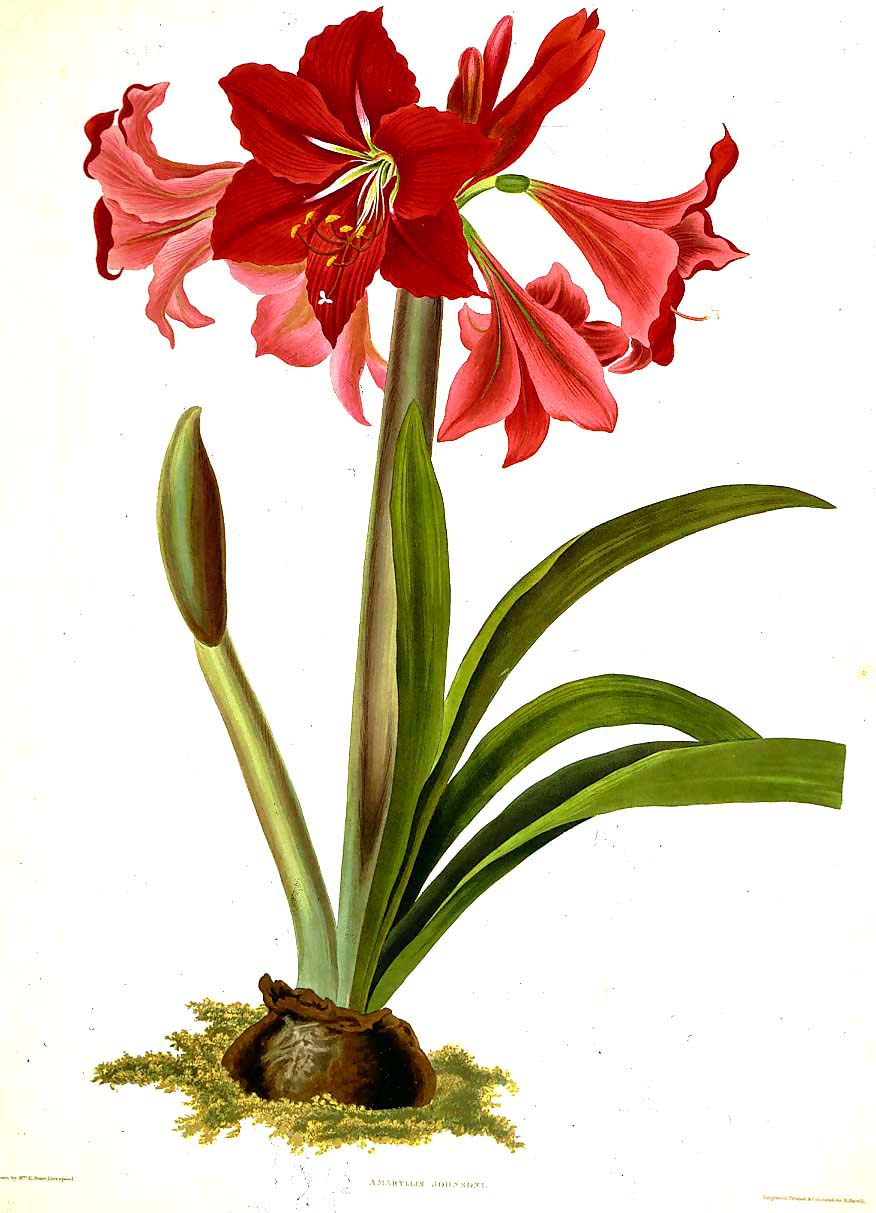
Hippeastrum ×johnsonii

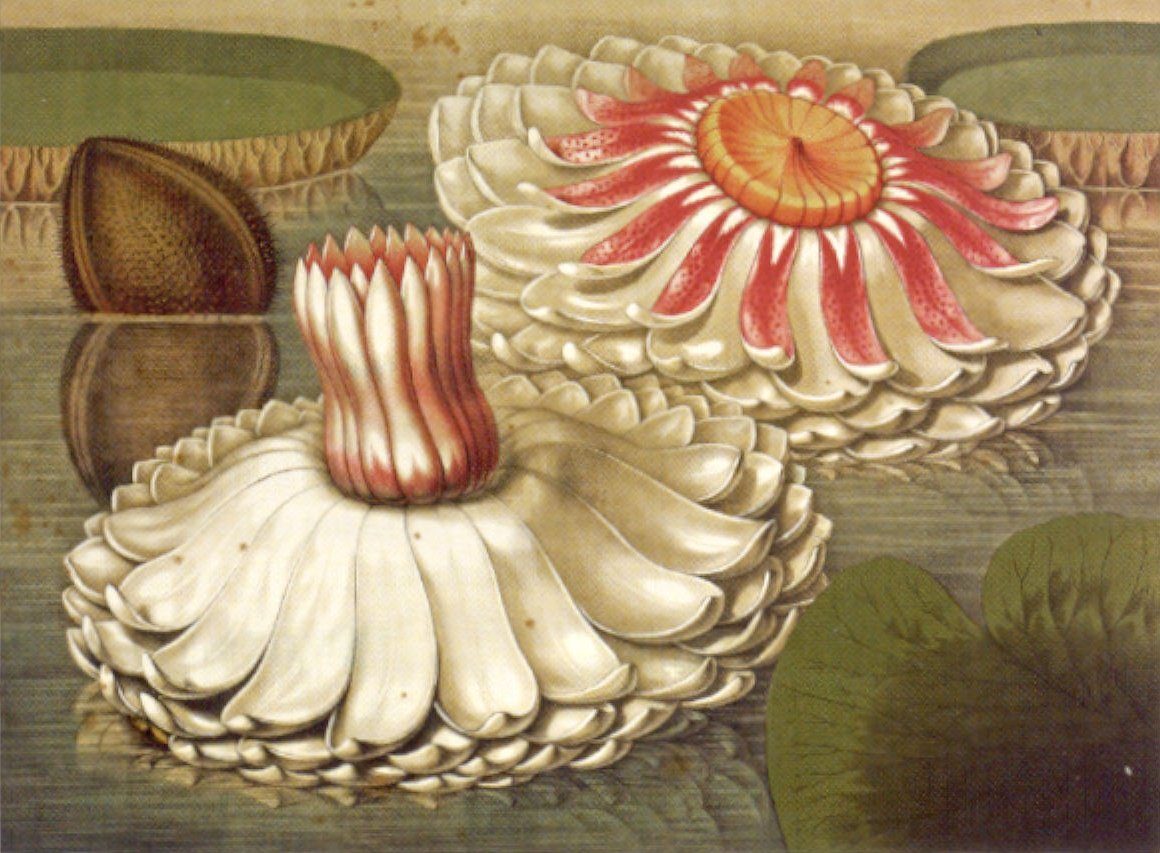
Lily in A Selection of Hexandrian Plants

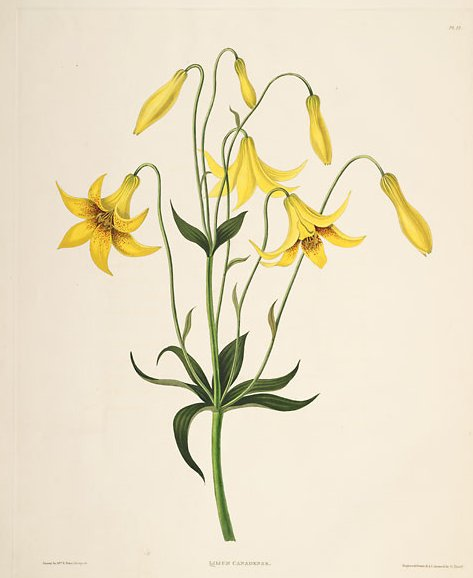
Lilium canadense

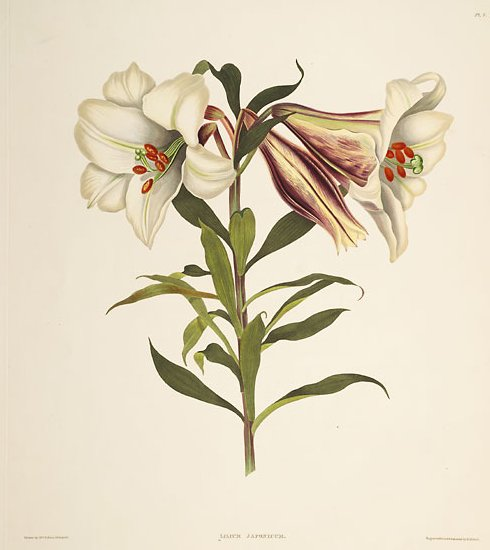
Lilium brownii var. viridulum

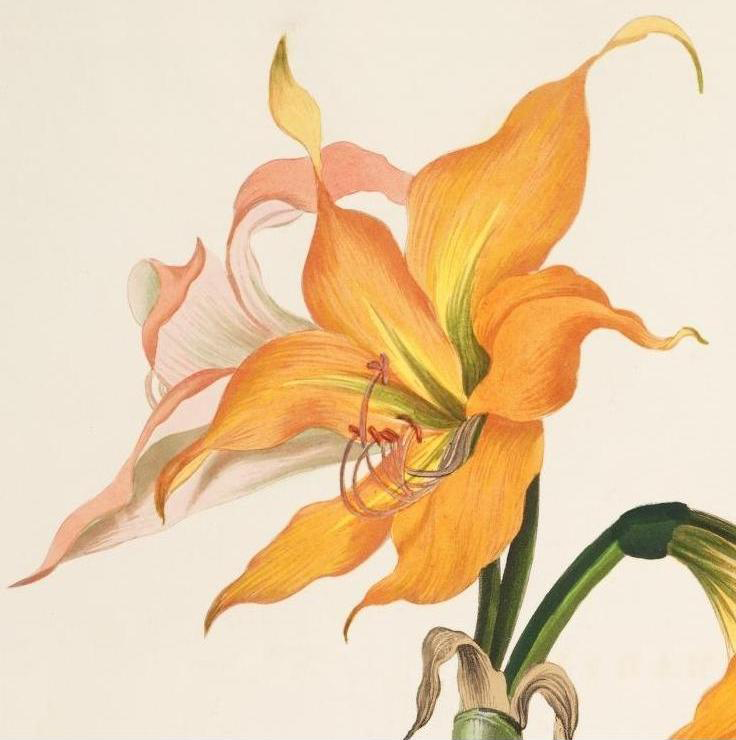
Hippeastrum Striatum

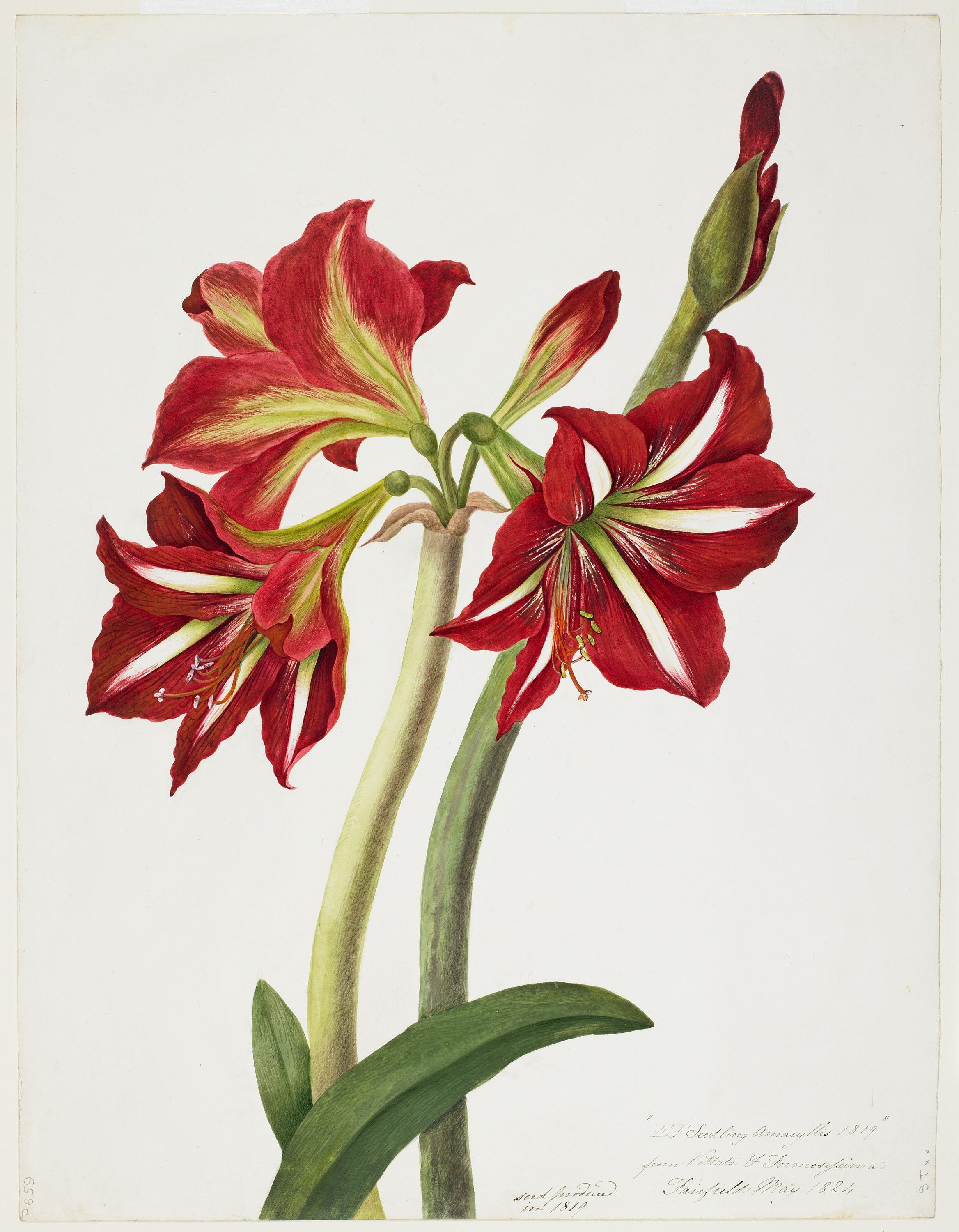
E.F. Seedling Amaryllus, 1819. Minneapolis Institute of Art

== Bibliography ==
- 1859: Recollections of Edward Bury, by his Widow (Privately published, Windermere)
- 1862: Figures of Remarkable Forms of Polycystins, or allied organisms, in the Barbados Chalk Deposit; drawn by Mrs. Bury. Windermere: John Garnett, [1862]

== Sources ==
Works cited

- Brent Elliott (2001). Flora. Une histoire illustrée des fleurs de jardin. Delachaux et Niestlé (Lausanne): 335 p.
