= List of mayors of Lancaster =

There have been about 600 mayors in Lancaster, Lancashire since 1338.

== Mayors from 1338 to 1937 ==
- 1338 Robert de Bolron
- 1341 John le Keu
- 1342 Robert de Bolron
- 1345 Robert de Bolron
- 1346 Robert de Bolron
- 1347 Robert de Bolron
- 1349 Robert de Bolron
- 1350 John de Catheron
- 1362/3 John de Skerton
- 1371 John de Skerton
- 1372 John de Skerton
- 1373 John de Catherton
- 1381 John de Catherton
- 1382 Edmund Frere
- 1386 John de Elslak
- 1391 John de Elslak
- 1403 John Stanlow
- 1407 Richard Elslak
- 1416 Richard Elslak
- 1425 Edmund Frere
- 1440 Edmund Hornby
- 1442 John Stodagh
- 1446 Edmund Hornby
- 1452 Thomas Curwen
- 1459 Robert Lawrence
- 1463 Robert Ramso
- 1465 William Skillicorne
- 1467 John Gardyner
- 1472 Robert Lee
- 1474/5 John Curwen
- 1478 Simon Tomlinson
- 1483 John Hobersty
- 1488 John Walton
- 1488 Richard Gardener
- 1488 Christopher Leming
- 1489 Christopher Leming
- 1495 Lawrence Starkie
- 1498 Richard Gardyner
- 1500 Thomas Edmondson
- 1500/1 Richard Nelson
- 1504 Robert Hirdeman
- 1508 Gilbert White
- 1512 Richard Nelson
- 1524 William Sclaiter
- 1527 John Standish
- 1542 John Standish
- 1543 John Standish
- 1552 Richard Gardyner
- 1553 William Colteman
- 1560/1 John Huetson
- 1562 William Coltman
- 1563 Ranulf Gilpin
- 1564 William Bateson
- 1565 William Coltman
- 1565 Nicholas Oliver
- 1566 Nicholas Oliver
- 1569 John Huetson
- 1569 Nicholas Olivers
- 1570 Nicholas Olivers
- 1572 Nicholas Olivers
- 1573 Robert Dalton
- 1574 John Hewetson
- 1575 Nicholas Olivers
- 1577 James Brown
- 1578/9 Richard Gilpin
- 1580 Gawin Braitwat
- 1581 James Brown
- 1582 Gawin Braythwayte
- 1595 Thomas Southworthe
- 1598 James Browne
- 1600 Nicholas Eccleston
- 1601 James Browne
- 1602 Nicholas Eccleston
- 1606 Thomas Covell
- 1607 Nicholas Eccleston
- 1608 George Thompson
- 1609 William Parkinson
- 1628 Thomas Covelle
- 1629 Galfridus Heysham
- 1630 George Toulnson
- 1631 Edmund Covelle
- 1632 Richard Sands
- 1633 William Shaw
- 1638 Richard Sands
- 1639 William Shaw
- 1645 William Shaw
- 1650 George Toulnson
- 1652 Major Riparn
- 1653 Thomas Riparn
- 1654 Thomas Riparn
- 1655 John Bateman
- 1661 Henry Porter
- 1663 Thomas Soothworth
- 1664 Thomas Johnes
- 1664 William Waller
- 1665 Sir Robert Bindlosse
- 1666 William Parkinson
- 1667 Francis Hunter
- 1668 William West
- 1669 Thomas Soothworth
- 1670 William Waller
- 1671 John Greenwood
- 1672/3 Sir Robert Bindloss & William Parkinson
- 1674 Thomas Corless
- 1675 Christopher Prockter
- 1676 William Toulson
- 1677 William Waller
- 1678 John Greenwood
- 1679 Francis Hunter
- 1680 Francis Medcalfe & Christopher Prockter
- 1681 Henry Johnes
- 1682 Joshua Partington
- 1683 Randal Hunter
- 1684 John Hodgson
- 1685 Robert Stirzaker
- 1686 John Foster
- 1687/8 Thomas Sherson & John Greenwood
- 1688/9 John Hodgson & John Greenwood
- 1689 John Foster
- 1690 Thomas Baynes
- 1691 Henry Johnes
- 1692 Joshua Partington
- 1693 John Hodgson
- 1694 William Penny
- 1695 Thomas Medcalfe
- 1696 George Foxcroft
- 1697 Thomas Waller
- 1698 Robert Parkinson
- 1699 Robert Carter
- 1700 Thomas Sherson
- 1701 John Hodgson
- 1702 William Penny
- 1703 Thomas Simpson
- 1704 Thomas Medcalf
- 1705 Thomas Waller
- 1706 Robert Parkinson
- 1707 Robert Carter
- 1708 Thomas Westmore
- 1709 Thomas Sherson
- 1710 Thomas Gardner
- 1711 William Penny
- 1712 Richard Simpson
- 1713 John Bryer
- 1714 Thomas Waller
- 1715 Robert Parkinson
- 1716 Edmund Cole
- 1717 Robert Carter
- 1718 Thomas Westmore
- 1719 Richard Simpson
- 1720 John Bryer
- 1721 Thomas Waller
- 1722 Christopher Butterfield
- 1723 Thomas Croft
- 1725 Edmund Cole
- 1726 Robert Winder
- 1727 Thomas Westmore
- 1728 John Coward
- 1729 Thomas Postlethwaite
- 1730 John Casson
- 1731 Christopher Butterfield
- 1732 James Smethurst
- 1733 James Tomlinson
- 1734 John Bowes
- 1735 William Bryer
- 1736 Edmund Cole
- 1737 Robert Winder
- 1738 Thomas Postlethwaite
- 1739 Thomas Smoult
- 1740 John Gunson
- 1741 John Casson
- 1742 John Bowes
- 1743 William Bryer
- 1744 Robert Winder
- 1745 Thomas Gibson
- 1746 James Holmes
- 1747 Henry Bracken
- 1748 James Rigmaiden
- 1749 Miles Barber
- 1750 Thomas Postlethwaite
- 1751 John Gunson
- 1752 Joshua Bryer
- 1753 Gwalter Borranskill
- 1754 Robert Winder
- 1755 John McMillan
- 1756 William Butterfield
- 1757 Henry Bracken
- 1758 Miles Barber
- 1759 Joshua Bryer
- 1760 Robert Foxcroft
- 1761 Gwalter Boranskill
- 1762 Robert Winder
- 1763 John Stout
- 1764 Robert Walshman
- 1765 Edward Suart
- 1766 James Hinde
- 1767 John Bowes
- 1768 James Barrow
- 1769 Thomas Hinde
- 1770 William Butterfield
- 1771 Robert Foxcroft
- 1772 John Stout
- 1773 Edward Suart
- 1774 James Hinde
- 1775 John Bowes
- 1776 Henry Hargreaves
- 1777 James Barrow
- 1778 Thomas Hinde
- 1779 William Butterfield
- 1780 Robert Foxcroft
- 1781 Edward Suart
- 1782 James Hinde
- 1783 James Bowes
- 1784 Henry Hargreaves
- 1785 Miles Mason
- 1786 William Watson
- 1787 John Housman
- 1788 Samuel Simpson
- 1789 John Watson
- 1790 Anthony Atkinson
- 1791 Edward Suart
- 1792 James Hinde
- 1793 John Tallon
- 1794 Robert Addison
- 1795 Richard Johnson
- 1796 David Campbell
- 1797 Thomas Harris
- 1798 James Moore
- 1799 Richard Postelthwaite
- 1800 Richard Atkinson
- 1801 James Parkinson
- 1802 Thomas Shepherd
- 1803 Robert Addison
- 1804 Jackson Mason
- 1805 Richard Johnson
- 1806 Thomas Burrow
- 1807 John Taylor Wilson
- 1808 James Moore & Thomas Moore
- 1809 Richard Atkinson
- 1810 Thomas Moore
- 1811 John Baldwin
- 1812 Thomas Giles
- 1813 Richard Johnson
- 1814 John Park
- 1815 Thomas Burrow
- 1816 John Wilson
- 1817 Samuel Gregson
- 1818 Thomas Salisbury
- 1819 John Bond
- 1820 James Atkinson
- 1821 Thomas Bowes
- 1822 James Nottage
- 1823 Thomas Giles
- 1824 Leonard Redmayne
- 1825 Samuel Gregson
- 1826 John Wilson
- 1827 Thomas Salisbury
- 1828 George Burrow
- 1829 John Bond
- 1830 James Atkinson
- 1831 Thomas Giles
- 1832 Christopher Johnson
- 1833 George Burrow
- 1834 John Brockbank
- 1835/36 George Burrow
- 1836/37 Thomas Higgin
- 1837/38 John Greg
- 1838/39 John Armstrong
- 1839/40 Joseph Dockray
- 1840/41 William Robinson
- 1841/42 Johnathan Dunn
- 1842/43 Johnathan Dunn
- 1843/44 Edward de Vitre
- 1844/45 Edward Salisbury
- 1845/46 James Giles
- 1846/47 John Sharp
- 1847/48 Thomas Howitt
- 1848/49 Edmund Sharpe
- 1849/50 Joseph Dockray
- 1850/51 Henry Gregson
- 1851/52 John Sherson
- 1852/53 John Hall
- 1853/54 John Burrell
- 1854/55 John Brocklebank
- 1855/56 Edward de Vitre
- 1856/57 Richard Hinde
- 1857/58 Christopher Johnson
- 1858/59 William Jackson
- 1859/60 William Whelan
- 1860/61 John Greg
- 1861/62 Henry Gregson
- 1862/63 John Greg
- 1863/64 George Jackson
- 1864/65 James Williamson Snr
- 1866/67 William Wane
- 1867/68 Thomas Storey
- 1868/69 Richard Coupland
- 1869/70 William Roper
- 1870/71 William Bradshaw
- 1871/72 Charles Blades
- 1872/73 William Storey
- 1873/74 Thomas Storey
- 1874/75 Thomas Storey
- 1875/76 Thomas Preston
- 1876/77 Henry Welch
- 1877/78 Abram Welch
- 1878/79 William Hall
- 1879/80 George Cleminson
- 1880/81 Edward Clark
- 1881/82 Samuel Harris
- 1882/83 Joseph Fenton
- 1883/84 Samuel Harris
- 1884/85 Edward Clark
- 1885/86 James Hatch
- 1886/87 Thomas Storey
- 1887/88 Charles Blades
- 1888/89 Charles Blades
- 1889/90 Thomas Preston
- 1890/91 Charles Blades
- 1891/92 William Smith
- 1892/93 John Kitchen
- 1893/94 William Gilchrist
- 1894/95 Robert Preston
- 1895/96 William Huntington
- 1896/97 Norval Helme
- 1897/98 William Huntington
- 1898/99 William Bell
- 1899/1900 Robert Preston
- 1900/01 Robert Preston
- 1901/02 Richard Hall
- 1902/03 George Jackson
- 1903/04 John Allen
- 1904/05 James Heald
- 1905/06 Alexander Satterthwaite
- 1906/07 William Hamilton
- 1907/08 Robert Wilson
- 1908/09 Robert Wilson
- 1909/10 Robert Wilson
- 1910/11 Robert Preston
- 1911/12 Edward Cardwell
- 1912/13 Charles Seward
- 1913/14 William Briggs
- 1914/15 William Briggs
- 1915/16 William Briggs
- 1916/17 William Briggs
- 1917/18 William Briggs
- 1918/19 William Briggs
- 1919/20 George Wright
- 1920/21 Thomas Wilkinson
- 1921/22 John Robert Nuttall
- 1922/23 James Oglethorpe
- 1923/24 George Jackson
- 1924/25 George Jackson
- 1925/26 Robert Roberts
- 1926/27 Isaac Curwen
- 1927/28 Edward Parr
- 1928/29 Edward Smith
- 1929/30 Thomas Till
- 1930/31 James Hodkinson
- 1931/32 William Procter
- 1932/33 Annie E. Helme
- 1933/34 Henry Warbrick
- 1934/35 William Simpson
- 1935/36 James Clark
- 1936/37 Robert Bamber

== Mayors from 1937 to 1974. ==
The City of Lancaster gained City status on 12 May 1937, as part of the Coronation celebrations of King George VI The Mayor was henceforth entitled to be addressed as "The Right Worshipful the Mayor" of the City of Lancaster.

- 1936/37 Robert Bamber
- 1937/38 Harry Dowthwaite
- 1938/39 Hermione Musgrave-Hoyle
- 1939/40 Vincent Cross
- 1940/41 Muriel Dowbiggin
- 1941/42 Joseph Waddington
- 1942/43 Alex Robertson
- 1943/44 Walter Grosse
- 1944/45 Arthur Grosse
- 1945/46 George Blatchford
- 1946/47 James Dirkin
- 1947/48 Herbert Butler
- 1948/49 Herbert Butler
- 1949/50 George Chirnside
- 1950/51 George Chirnside
- 1951/52 Harry Price
- 1952/53 Charles Treu
- 1953/54 Norman Gorrill
- 1954/55 Bert Scott
- 1955/56 Thomas Hully
- 1956/57 Helen Daniel
- 1957/58 Thomas Hayton
- 1958/59 James Rogerson
- 1959/60 Cecilia Pickard
- 1960/61 Percival Oliver
- 1961/62 Margery Lovett-Horn
- 1962/63 Ernest Gardner
- 1963/64 Chris Preston
- 1964/65 Alfred Morris
- 1965/66 Clara Burt
- 1966/67 Eric Jones
- 1967/68 Charles Denwood
- 1968/69 Eric Simpson
- 1969/70 Douglas Clift
- 1970/71 Samuel Smith
- 1971/72 Winifred Sweeney
- 1972/73 Doris Henderson
- 1973/74 Roland Jones

== Post 1974 ==
The former City and Municipal Borough of Lancaster and the Municipal Borough of Morecambe and Heysham along with other authorities merged in 1974 to form the City of Lancaster district within the shire county of Lancashire.
