= Jackson National Fish Hatchery =

Coordinates: 43°32′10″N 110°43′59″W

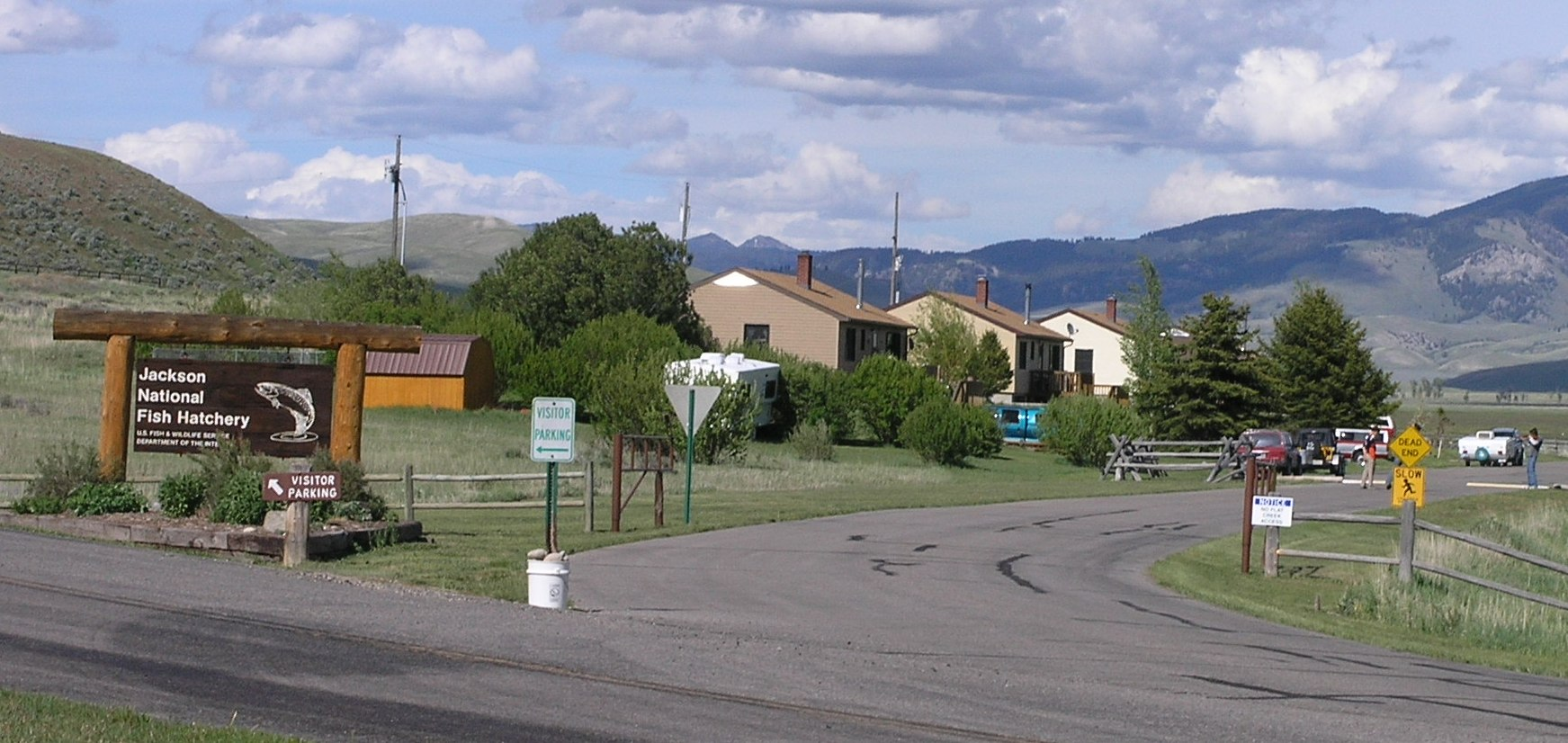
Jackson National Fish Hatchery in Jackson, Wyoming

Jackson National Fish Hatchery is a National fish hatchery in Jackson, Wyoming. The hatchery is run by the U.S. Fish and Wildlife Service. The hatchery is physically located on the National Elk Refuge, a protected feeding ground for elk that winter in the Jackson Hole valley. The fish hatchery produces fish for a 18,000-square-mile (47,000 km^{2}) distribution area in Wyoming and Idaho.

== Species ==
The Jackson National Fish Hatchery rears one species of fish: the Snake River fine-spotted cutthroat trout (Oncoryhnchus clarki behnkei).

== See also ==
- List of National Fish Hatcheries in the United States
- Saratoga National Fish Hatchery
