= Christopher W. Johnson =

British computer scientist (born 1965)

Christopher Johnson CEng FREng FRSE FBCS
- Born: Christopher William Johnson; 15 April 1965 (age 61); Edinburgh, Scotland
- Education: University of Cambridge (MA); University of York (MSc); University of York (DPhil)
- Known for: cyber security, safety critical systems
- Scientific career
- Fields: Computer science; Cyber Security; Safety Engineering
- Workplaces: University of Glasgow, Queen's University Belfast
- Thesis: A Principled Approach to the Integration of Human Factors and Systems Engineering for Interactive Control System Design (1992)
- Website: www.dcs.gla.ac.uk/~johnson

Christopher W. Johnson FREng FRSE is a British computer scientist and pro vice chancellor for engineering and physical sciences at Queen's University, Belfast. Previously he was professor and head of computing science at the University of Glasgow, UK. From July 2024, he has served as Chief Scientific Adviser to the UK Government's Department for Science, Innovation and Technology.

== Education and early life ==
Chris Johnson was born on 15 April 1965. He was educated at Verulam School, Trinity College, Cambridge (MA), and the University of York (MSc, DPhil).

== Career and research ==
Johnson's research focuses on the resilience of safety-critical systems.

Much of his early work was conducted in collaboration with C. Michael Holloway and the software engineering teams at NASA Langley He subsequently worked with the USAF Safety Centre and with Space Command. He helped develop European guidelines for contingency planning in aviation for EUROCONTROL and accident investigation for the European Railway Agency.

He helped establish the cybersecurity labs for the UK civil nuclear industry, that subsequently supported UK MoD work, leading to the formation of the Glasgow Cyber Defence Lab. He supported the United Nations in improving the cyber security of Chemical, Biological, Radiological and Nuclear facilities (CBRN). Johnson designed the cyber incident reporting processes under Article 13a of the Framework Directive (2009/140/EC) and Article 4 of the e-Privacy directive (2002/58/EC) on behalf of the European Network and Information Security Agency (ENISA).

== Other appointments ==
He was an expert witness for the public inquiry into the Grenfell Tower fire where he addressed the communications issues that exacerbated the evacuation of the residents.

He is the only academic member of the UK National Cyber Advisory Board, chaired by the Deputy Prime Minister of the United Kingdom, charged to support the implementation of the UK National Cyber Security Policy.

He serves as co-chair of the National Cyber Security Centre (United Kingdom) Community of Interest in Industrial Control Systems.

Johnson was elected to the UK Computing Research Committee (2016–2022); where he was responsible for the interface with public policy.

He chaired the EPSRC Strategic Advisory Team on Information, Communication and Technology ICT (2021–2024) and was a member of the EPSRC Strategic Advisory Team on Equality, Diversity and Inclusion (EDI).

He attends the Northern Ireland Assembly Stormont All Party Group on STEM., supported the Scottish government's Building National Resilience working group and is a member of the Royal Irish Academy's Engineering and Computing Science Committee.

Previously, Johnson chaired the scientific advisory board to the EC SESAR programme for the modernisation of air traffic management. In 2017, he helped deliver the UK Department for Transport review of cyber security across the UK aviation industry and was the only academic invited to present at the UN/ICAO first summit of cyber security in aviation.

== Awards and honours ==
He is a Fellow of the Royal Society of Edinburgh, a Fellow of the Royal Aeronautical Society and of the British Computer Society. In 2023, he was awarded one of only five fellowships from the International Federation of Information Processing, recognised by the United Nations. In 2025, he was elected Fellow of the Royal Academy of Engineering.
