= Moirai (video game) =

2013 horror video game

- Steam version header art
- Designer: Chris Johnson
- Artist: Brad Barrett
- Composer: John Oestmann
- Platforms: Windows, OS X, Linux
- Release: November 25, 2013
- Genre: Adventure
- Mode: Multiplayer

Moirai is a 2013 video game created by independent developers Chris Johnson, Brad Barrett and John Oestmann. Described by the developers as an experimental game, whilst gameplay at first appears to be a narrative single-player adventure game, completion of Moirai reveals to the player that their decisions influence the experience of the next person to play the game. Moirai received analysis and reflection from critics and academics for its innovative gameplay model and moral dimensions of play. Player engagement with Moirai was marked by a high level of trolling, and a hack of the game's database led the developers to discontinue the online portion of the game in June 2017.

== Plot ==
Moirai is set in a small village where the player is informed that a woman named Julia has gone missing. The player is tasked to investigate noises coming from a local cave beyond the village. They can explore the village and speak to her neighbors to learn about Julia's story. The player is given a lantern and a knife by a pair of lumberjacks to assist them with exploring the cave. Whilst walking through the cave, players encounter a blood-stained figure wielding a lantern and a knife. The player must ask them three questions: "Why do you have blood on your overalls?", "Why do you have a knife?", and "I heard moans, what have you done?". The player then is given the option to let the figure pass or attack them.

At the end of the cave, the player finds Julia. She tells the player that she came into the cave to end her life. Julia tells the player that her husband had found a golden nugget whilst mining in the cave, but buried the nugget and disappeared. Her son had come into the cave searching for his lost father, and also met the same fate. Julia asks the player assist her in ending her life. The player may choose to kill her, or refuse to do so and seek help. Regardless of the choice, the player will be covered in blood. Upon exiting the cave, players encounter a person, who is the stand-in for the next player who will play the game. Players are required to input a response to the same three questions asked of the blood-stained figure when they entered the game, revealing that the figure they met earlier was a stand-in for the previous person that had completed the game. The game then ends, with the player being told that it is up to the next player of this game to choose their fate; players are invited to input their name and email address to receive the information on the outcome of the succeeding player's decision to kill or spare them.

== Development ==
Moirai was created as a collaboration between Australian developers Chris Johnson, Brad Barrett and John Oestmann. The lead developer, Chris Johnson, was a lecturer at the School of Computer Science at the University of Adelaide and a programmer in the visual effects industry, who had worked on prior projects including the puzzle game Expand. Moirai was developed over a two-month period in 2013, originally intended as an entry for the 7 Day FPS Game Jam, until time constraints motivated the developers to consider a standalone release. Johnson stated "we spent a few hours on it each week between jobs, study and other projects. It took us about two months to finish the game and we tested the game over a month long period".

Chris Johnson stated that Moirai was conceived an experimental title, inspired by his experience watching an interactive play A Game of You by Belgian theatre performance group Ontroerend Goed. Described as "a game in which the rules are bent and that only become apparent as you play", the audience is invited to make comments about the appearance of other audience members isolated behind a one-way mirror, that are later revealed to be shared with the person in question. Other influences included the films of Alfred Hitchcock, whose narratives frequently involve "characters in scenes where they look guilty, and look like they're going to be framed", and the social deduction video games SpyParty and Hidden In Plain Sight. The title of Moirai references the Moirai of Ancient Greek religion and mythology, whose personification of fate connects to the themes of player choice in the game.

== Release ==
Player interaction in Moirai is unfiltered, leading to bizarre and obscene responses.

Moirai was initially released for website download and Game Jolt on November 25, 2013, and for download on itch.io on February 20, 2014. The game was submitted to Steam Greenlight on July 31, 2015, and released on Steam on 23 July, 2016. Following its Steam release, Moirai received unexpected attention, with Chris Johnson saying that "the response from players completely exceeded our expectations". Notable content creators on YouTube featured Moirai in playthrough videos, helping to boost the game's popularity, with the most popular videos by Markiplier and Jacksepticeye having 2.3 and 1.3 million views as of November 2022. Overall, Johnson estimates Moirai was downloaded at least 500,000 times, with 10,581 total playthroughs recorded.

Player interactions in Moirai were marked by a high degree of trolling and abuse. Over half (53%) of players included profanity in their responses to other players. This behavior increased when Moirai launched on Steam in 2016, with Johnson struggling to manage the high demand of the game's servers and monitoring the database of player responses, which were emailed to him directly. Johnson stated "I was surprised by (the surplus of toxic entries)...I think I was a little bit naive...Some of that comes because it's a free game and a lot of people who played it are kids. The other side...is people want to push the boundaries of the rules."

In 2017, the Moirai server was subject to repeated attacks, including a script that flooded the game's database of player responses, requiring the developers to take down the system. These efforts were later identified as the exploits of a single hacker. Although the exploits were possible to fix, because the developers lacked the time, money and resources to address the many issues with the game, an announcement was made on June 29, 2017 that Moirai would no longer be available on Steam and its servers would be discontinued.

== Reception ==
=== Reviews ===
Critics praised Moirai for its unique premise and gameplay, with many writers reflecting upon the moral implications presented by the player decisions and interactions in the game. Heather Alexandra of Kotaku praised the "complexity" of the moral dilemma presented in Moirai, stating "the slow realisation that you were dealing with another player all along creates a very particular sort of reflection that can't help but make you wonder how you were perceived in turn...Moirai wants you to reminds players that very few things are exactly as they seem." Janine Hawkins of Vice praised the game's manipulation of player expectations, stating it "upended my presumptions and reminded me that games are constructed, and that construction can have a purpose beyond what's immediately obvious. We get used to mechanics that don't lie to us...games seldom take advantage of that." Writing for The Boston Globe, Jesse Singal stated Moirai was "strange" and "compelling" and handled its themes around morality well, stating the game's twist had an enduring effect and made him think about the real-world consequences of his choices. Shaun Prescott of PC Gamer praised how the game tested players' ability to react to a moral dilemma, particularly exploring "how you comport yourself when you think no-one's listening". Writing for Rock Paper Shotgun, Porpentine Heartscape disagreed with the premise that Moirai was about a moral dilemma, stating the game explored the flaws of judgment and justice in creating varied outcomes based upon how well the player is able to advocate for themselves.

Critics also noted Moirai possessed unexpected qualities as a horror game, with Shaun Prescott of PC Gamer praising Moirai as one of the "most disturbing" and "weirdest" games on the PC. Writing for CNET, Mark Serrels praised the "bizarre and unnerving" nature of the gameplay. Janine Hawkins of Vice described Moirai as "wonderfully creepy", stating the game's "morbid intrigue" explained "why it has such a following among those who love unique and experimental games".

=== Academic reception ===
Moirai received academic interest for its innovative qualities as an experimental game. The game was recognised for its emergent gameplay, as its narrative "is not pre-structured or pre-programmed", but emerges through unpredictable player decisions in a way that departs from storytelling techniques available in other mediums. Game studies recognised several innovative elements in the game's emergent storytelling. For instance, Moirai features asynchronous interaction between players, meaning "expressions and choices are not experienced in real-time", although players possess the ability to influence the experience of others after they finish the game. Moirai also uses replay as a narrative device, requiring "multiple acts of play" across players to drive the ongoing chain of interactions that sustain the narrative.

Moirai was also praised for exploiting ludonarrative dissonance by manipulating player expectations around the consequences of their decision-making, as players are not aware at first they are participating in a multiplayer game. The revelation that these choices are not private exposes a "lack of safety" that "raises the question of how safe...choices in any game really are", given that "human experiments and interpersonal choices always entail risk". However, others have critiqued that whilst Moirai can "(provide) players with the opportunity to exercise their creativity and formulate a unique reply", the open-ended and unfiltered player responses can break players' immersion with messages unrelated to the context of the game.
