= International Journal for Parasitology =

- Discipline: Parasitology
- Language: English
- Edited by: Brian M. Cooke

Publication details
- History: 1971-present
- Publisher: Elsevier
- Frequency: 14/year
- Impact factor: 3.981 (2020)

Standard abbreviations
- ISO 4: Int. J. Parasitol.

Indexing
- CODEN: IJPYBT
- ISSN: 0020-7519 (print); 1879-0135 (web)
- LCCN: 79617745
- OCLC no.: 01771044

Links
- Journal homepage; Online access; facebook

The International Journal for Parasitology is an international medical journal published for the Australian Society for Parasitology by Elsevier. The journal includes original research articles, reviews, and commentary relating to parasites and their host interactions.
