= Chris Johnson (safety, born 1960) =

American football player (born 1960)

No. 30
- Position: Safety

Personal information
- Born: December 3, 1960 (age 65); Miami, Florida, U.S.
- Listed height: 6 ft 4 in (1.93 m)
- Listed weight: 225 lb (102 kg)

Career information
- College: Millersville

Career history
- Philadelphia Eagles (1987)
- Stats at Pro Football Reference

Christopher T. Johnson (born December 3, 1960) is an American former professional football player who was a strong safety for the Philadelphia Eagles of the National Football League (NFL). He played college football for the Millersville Marauders.
