= Christopher Johnson (surgeon) =

Mayor of Lancaster, surgeon and scientist (1782-1866)

- Born: 1782; Lancaster, UK
- Died: 1866 (aged 83–84)
- Education: University of Edinburgh
- Known for: surgeon; Mayor of Lancaster (1832)
- Spouse: Mary Welch
- Children: 2

Christopher Johnson (1782-1866) of Lancaster, UK was a surgeon and was appointed Mayor of Lancaster in 1832.

== Personal life ==
Christopher Johnson (1782-1866) was born in Lancaster, UK in 1782 and by 1794 both his parents were dead. His father, James Johnson (1752 - 1794) had been a doctor.

He married Mary Welch on 11 June 1812 and they had at least two sons, Christopher and James.

== Career ==
In 1796 Johnson started as an apprentice to a surgeon-apothecary in Preston. He followed this with a medical degree in Edinburgh and later had his first independent practice in Settle. He became a member of the Royal Medical Society of Edinburgh.

In 1809 he returned to Lancaster and was appointed as surgeon to the local Lonsdale Militia. By 1812 he was an honorary surgeon at the Dispensary, Castle Hill, Lancaster that provided free medical treatment to the poor. He was interested in forensic medicine and in 1813 he published an English translation entitled An Essay on the Signs of Murder in Newborn Children from a French book published by P. A. O. Mahon in Paris. In 1815 he organised the establishment of a local Board of Health that resulted in the foundation of Lancaster's House of Recovery for five patients, especially those with infectious diseases. Johnson was also one of the local surgeons who performed public dissections of those executed in Lancaster.

As well as medicine, he was interested in science, especially microscopy, and disseminated his knowledge within the local community. He was a member of the Lancaster Medical Book Club (1823) and Leeds Mechanic Institute (1824). He produced microscope slides of fossils that were drawn for publication by Priscilla Bury.

He was Mayor of Lancaster in 1832.
