= Journal of Wildlife Diseases =

- Discipline: Biology
- Language: English
- Edited by: James N. Mills

Publication details
- History: 1965-present
- Publisher: Wildlife Disease Association (United States)
- Frequency: Quarterly
- Impact factor: 1.355 (2014)

Standard abbreviations
- ISO 4: J. Wildl. Dis.

Indexing
- ISSN: 0090-3558 (print); 1943-3700 (web)
- OCLC no.: 1587351

Links
- Journal homepage; Online access

The Journal of Wildlife Diseases is a peer-reviewed quarterly journal published by the Wildlife Disease Association. The journal publishes research papers, case and epizootic reports, review articles, and book reviews on wildlife disease investigations. According to the Journal Citation Reports, the journal has a 2014 impact factor of 1.355.
