= Non-attainment area =

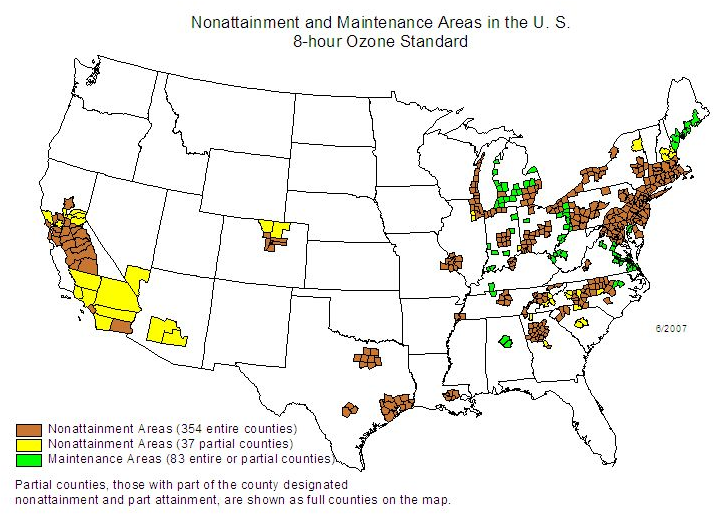
U.S. Non-Attainment Areas for ozone pollution in June 2007

In United States environmental law, a non-attainment area is an area that exceeds pollution limits for one or more criteria pollutants: ozone (O_{3}), atmospheric particulate matter (PM_{2.5}/PM_{10}), lead (Pb), carbon monoxide (CO), sulfur oxides (SO_{x}), and nitrogen oxides (NO_{x}).

== Classification ==
The criteria pollutants and their respective limits are defined in the National Ambient Air Quality Standards, which were a part of the Clean Air Act Amendments of 1970 (P.L. 91-604, Sec. 109). For each criterion pollutant the EPA establishes two different standards, primary and secondary. The primary standards are set at levels that are designed to protect human health, for sensitive populations which maybe effected by pollutants such as asmatics, children and the elderly. Secondary standards are set to prevent impacts on infrastructure, agriculture, and public welfare. The standards have been updated several times since 1970. The six criteria pollutants in particular are tracked due to their known harmful effects on human health and the environment. An area with outdoor air exceeding the limit for a given pollutant is considered to be in non-attainment for that pollutant. An area may be a non-attainment area for one pollutant and an "attainment area" for others. However, these pollutants are frequently associated with each other and thus a non-attainment area typically fails multiple standards. For example, nitrogen oxides and ozone are strongly correlated.

== Designation ==
When the Environmental Protection Agency (EPA) makes modifications to the National Ambient Air Quality Standards (NAAQS) or adds a new one, the Clean Air Act (P.L. 91-604, Sec. 109) (CAA) stipulates that the EPA must evaluate whether the NAAQS are met across the county. Current and previous standards are stored in an EPA Green Book for the criteria pollutants. State and tribal governments must recommend designations for areas in their jurisdiction with respect to the new NAAQS within one year. The state and tribal recommendations must be based on available air quality data. The EPA reviews the recommendations from state and tribal governments and the local air quality data, and designates each region one of three classifications within two years of the addition or revision to the NAAQS . Classifications include:

- attainment/unclassifiable – These areas are cleaner than the NAAQS.
- unclassifiable – There is not enough data to make a judgment in these areas.
- nonattainment – A pollutant exceeds the NAAQS in this area.

When an area is deemed as being in non-attainment, the CAA requires the development of a correction plan by state and local government within three years. Tribal governments are encouraged to create an implementation plan but are not required to. The plans are called State Implementation Plans or Tribal Implementation Plans. The state or tribe may request an area be redesignated as a "attainment/unclassifiable area" after three consecutive years of attaining the EPA's standard for the relevant pollutant(s). If approved, the area will no longer be considered a non-attainment area. However, if at a later date the area is shown to no longer meet the standard, it is redesignated as a non-attainment area. As a result, areas that are just below the EPA's limit may seek to further lower their pollution levels in order to mitigate the chance of briefly failing the standard and losing their designation as an attainment area.

== Implementation ==
The Clean Air Act (P.L. 91-604, Sec. 110) (CAA) stipulates that state governments must establish several types of State Implementation Plans (SIPs) that address regions at different spatial scales and involve public input. Infrastructure SIPs cover the state and detail how a state plans to maintain and meet the National Ambient Air Quality Standards (NAAQS) set by the Environmental Protection Agency (EPA). The goal of SIPs is to demonstrate that a state can implement the changes necessary to meet new NAAQSs and to identify the primary methods that will be implemented. Infrastructure SIPs are supported by nonattainment area SIPs, which are written for a given non-attainment area and vary based on local factors unique to each area.

Each type of SIP must be submitted for approval by the EPA, but are triggered for reevaluation and submission by different events. Infrastructure SIPS must be revised and submitted to the EPA for approval within 3 years of a new or revised NAAQS. Nonattainment area SIPs are due for approval by the EPA 18 or 24 months after the designation of an area as a nonattainment area through the designation process. Depending on the criteria pollutant that is in violation of the NAAQS, the nonattainment area SIP is due at different times. Criteria pollutants that are due 18 months after an area has been designated include sulfur dioxide (SO_{2}), nitrogen dioxide (NO_{2}), coarse particle pollution (PM_{10}), fine particle pollution (PM_{2.5}), and lead (Pb). Ozone (O_{3}) and carbon monoxide (CO) are due 24 months after designation.

As a corequisite of submission of SIPs to the EPA for approval, SIPs must also be adopted into state law. The EPA reviews SIPs and submits a preliminary judgment of each SIP for public comment, before submitting a final decision. Once approved the control measures detailed in SIPs become enforceable in court. If a state fails to submit a SIP or the submitted SIP is denied, the EPA must write a Federal Implementation Plan (FIP). The EPA can write FIPs to address nonattainment areas if tribal government's opt to refrain from producing a SIP.

== National Ambient Air Quality Standard Reevaluation Processes ==
Within the Clean Air Act (P.L. 91-604, Sec. 109) (CAA), the National Ambient Air Quality Standards (NAAQS) for each pollutant, both primary and secondary, can be reviewed and revised by the Environmental Protection Agency (EPA). Further, the CAA stipulates that the basis for each NAAQS is reviewed for scientific accuracy and relevance every 5 years. The revision process follows 6 general phases which seek to gauge current scientific understanding, include public input, reassess the risk of each pollutant, and create comprehensive policy.

- Planning Phase - Reviews new scientific evidence, and calls for public information.
- Assessment Phase - EPA produces quantitative risk assessments for the standard under review.
- Integrated Science Assessment (ISA) - Combines overall basis for policy judgements both historic and those generated in the Planning phase.
- Risk/Exposure Assessment (REA) - Makes quantitative measures of risk based on the Assessment and ISA phases.
- Policy Assessment (PA) - Senior EPA management reviews different policy options. The public can comment on policy options during this phase.
- Rulemaking Phase - A draft of the policy chosen by the EPA Management is submitted for further public review. The result of this comment period is a final EPA NAAQS update.

== Current Non-attainment Areas ==
The EPA maintains a list of non-attainment areas for all criteria pollutants in the United States, classified by county and sorted by state as a part of its Green Book. The Green Book contains data from 1992 to the present and details in which year(s) a county did not attain standards. It provides this information alongside other data such as county population and the severity of the recorded pollution.

As of October 31, 2023, it designates 258 counties as not attaining the standards for at least one pollutant. Since 1992, a total of 2094 counties have been a non-attainment area for at least one pollutant for at least one year.
