= Mortenson Lake National Wildlife Refuge =

Protected area in Wyoming, United States

- IUCN category IV (habitat/species management area)
- Location within the United States
- Location: Albany County, Wyoming, United States
- Nearest city: Laramie, WY
- Coordinates: 41°13′13″N 105°51′33″W
- Area: 1,776 acres (719 ha)
- Established: 1993
- Governing body: Arapaho National Wildlife Refuge and U.S. Fish and Wildlife Service
- Website: Mortenson Lake National Wildlife Refuge

Mortenson Lake National Wildlife Refuge is located in southern Albany County in the U.S. state of Wyoming and includes 1,776 acres (7.2 km^{2}). The refuge is managed by the U.S. Fish and Wildlife Service an agency within the U.S. Department of the Interior. Mortensen Lake NWR is a high altitude refuge and has several small alpine lakes of which Mortenson Lake is the largest. At 7,256 feet (2,211 m) above sea level, the refuge provides protection for numerous migratory bird species.

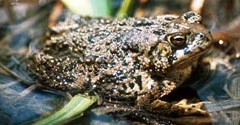
Wyoming toad

In 1984, the Wyoming toad was listed as an endangered species and was widely believed to be extinct in the wild. A small population of the toad was rediscovered in 1987 in the area surrounding Mortenson Lake which led to the establishment of the refuge in 1993. Since 1995, offspring from captured examples of this extremely rare amphibian have been released into the wild to help stabilize the remaining population. The refuge is closed to all public access to aid in recovery efforts of this endangered species.

Mortenson NWR is administered by Arapaho National Wildlife Refuge in Colorado.
