= Index of Wyoming-related articles =

The location of the state of Wyoming in the United States of America

The following is an alphabetical list of articles related to the U.S. state of Wyoming.

== 0–9 ==
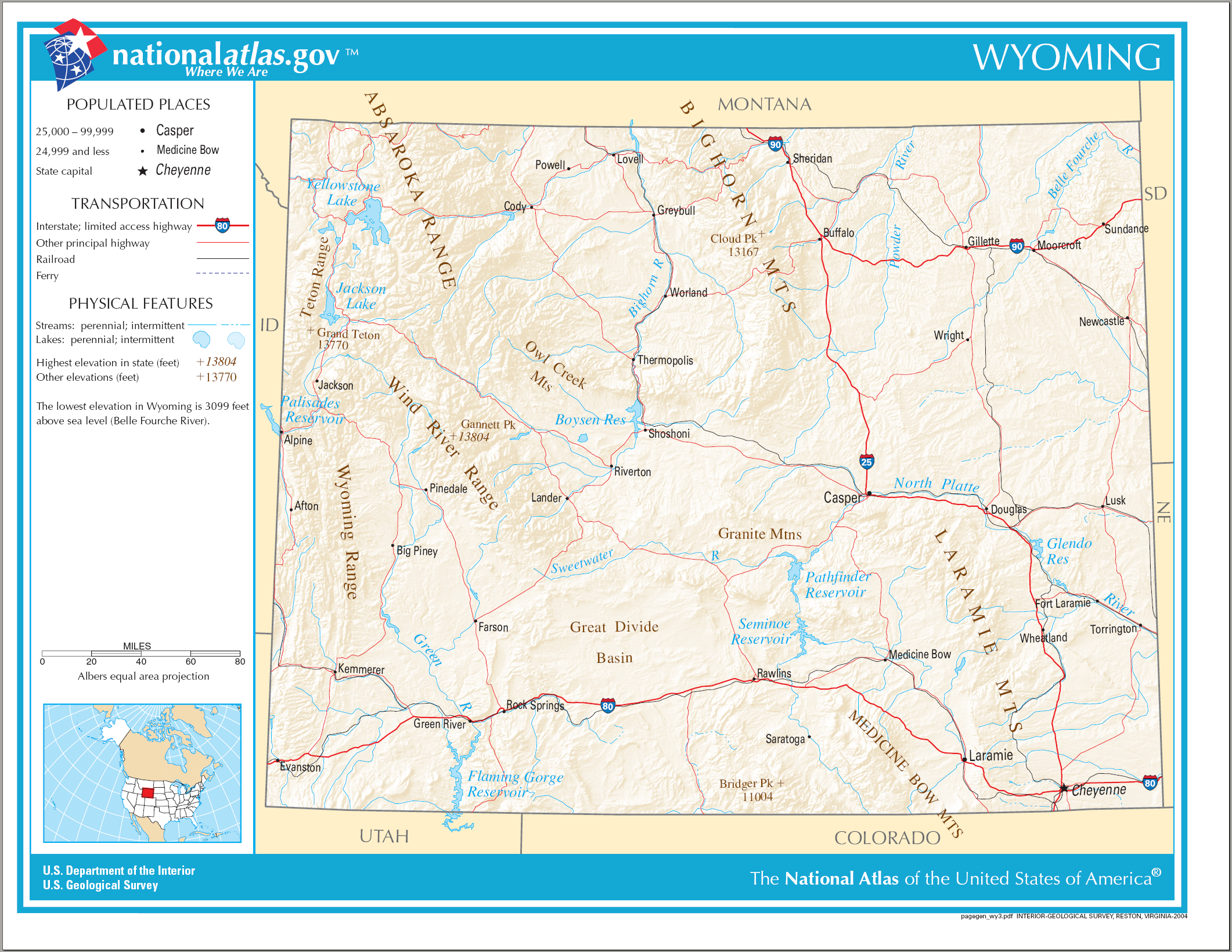
An enlargeable map of the state of Wyoming

- .wy.us – Internet second-level domain for the state government
- 27th meridian west from Washington
- 34th meridian west from Washington
- 41st parallel north
- 42nd parallel north
- 43rd parallel north
- 44th parallel north
- 44th State to join the United States
- 45th parallel north
- 105th meridian west
- 106th meridian west
- 107th meridian west
- 108th meridian west
- 109th meridian west
- 110th meridian west
- 111th meridian west

== A ==
- Absaroka Range
- Adams-Onís Treaty of 1819
- Adjacent states:
  - Colorado
  - Idaho
  - Montana
  - Nebraska
  - South Dakota
  - Utah
- Agriculture in Wyoming
- Airports in Wyoming
- Albany County
- American bison
- American Redoubt
- Archaeology of Wyoming
  - Category:Archaeological sites in Wyoming
    - commons:Category:Archaeological sites in Wyoming
- Architecture of Wyoming
- Area codes in Wyoming
- Art museums and galleries in Wyoming
  - commons:Category:Art museums and galleries in Wyoming
- Artists of Wyoming
- Astronomical observatories in Wyoming
  - commons:Category:Astronomical observatories in Wyoming

== B ==
- Battle of the Tongue River
- Big Horn County
- Big Horn Mountains
- Bison bison
- Black Hills
- Black Hills War
- Botanical gardens in Wyoming
  - commons:Category:Botanical gardens in Wyoming
- Bridges in Wyoming
  - Bridges on the National Register of Historic Places in Wyoming
- Bucking Horse and Rider
- Buildings and structures in Wyoming
  - commons:Category:Buildings and structures in Wyoming

== C ==
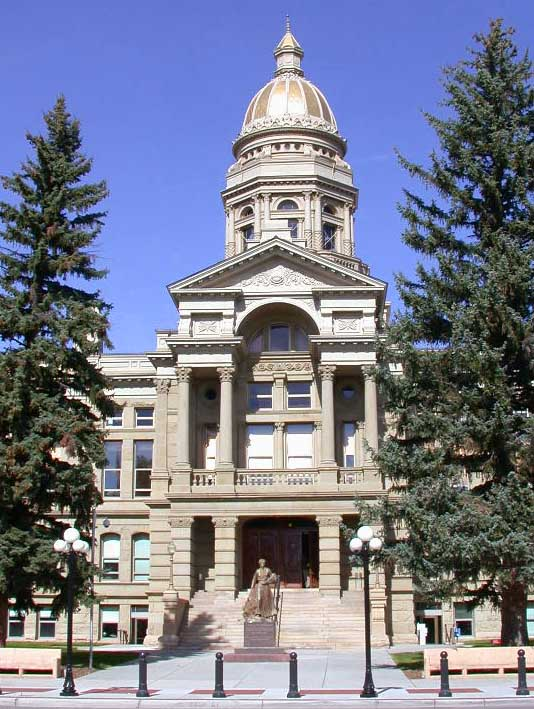
The Wyoming State Capitol in Cheyenne

- California Trail
- Campbell County
- Canyons and gorges of Wyoming
  - commons:Category:Canyons and gorges of Wyoming
- Capital of the State of Wyoming
- Capitol of the State of Wyoming
- Carbon County
- Castilleja linariifolia
- Census Designated Places in Wyoming
  - Census Designated Places in Wyoming
- Census statistical areas in Wyoming
- Cities in Wyoming
1. Cheyenne, territorial and state capital since 1869
2. Casper
3. Laramie
4. Gillette
5. Rock Springs
6. Sheridan
7. Green River
8. Evanston
9. Riverton
10. Cody
- Climate change in Wyoming
- Climate of Wyoming
- Cloud Peak
- Coal mining in Wyoming
- Cody, William Frederick "Buffalo Bill"
- Colleges and universities in Wyoming
- Communications in Wyoming
  - commons:Category:Communications in Wyoming

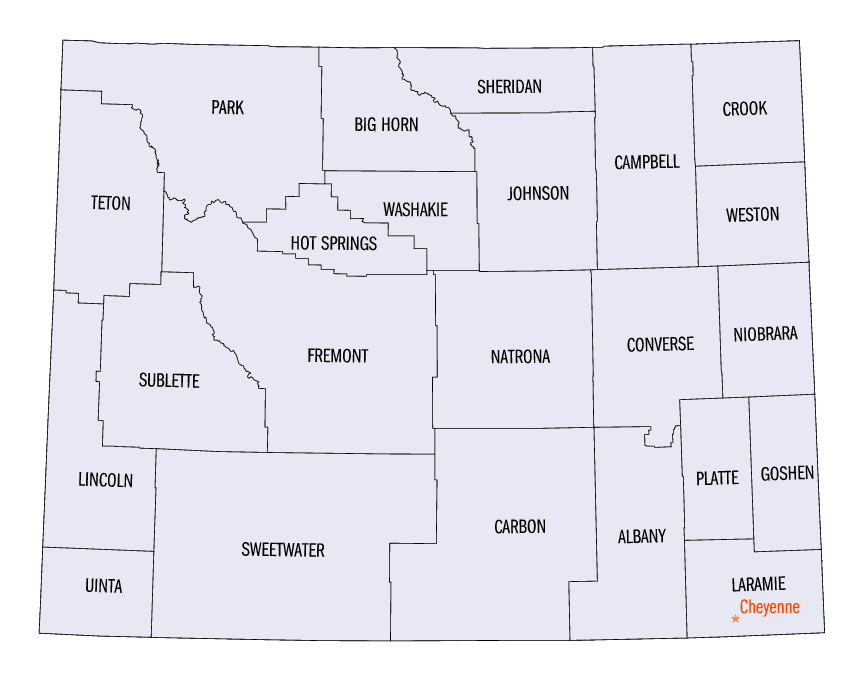
An enlargeable map of the 23 counties of the state of Wyoming

- Companies of Wyoming
  - Category:Companies based in Wyoming
- Converse County
- Counties of the State of Wyoming
  - Wyoming counties ranked by per capita income
- COVID-19 pandemic in Wyoming
- Crime in Wyoming
- Crook County
- Culture of Wyoming
  - commons:Category:Wyoming culture
- Cutthroat trout
  - Yellowstone cutthroat trout
  - Snake River fine-spotted cutthroat trout

== D ==
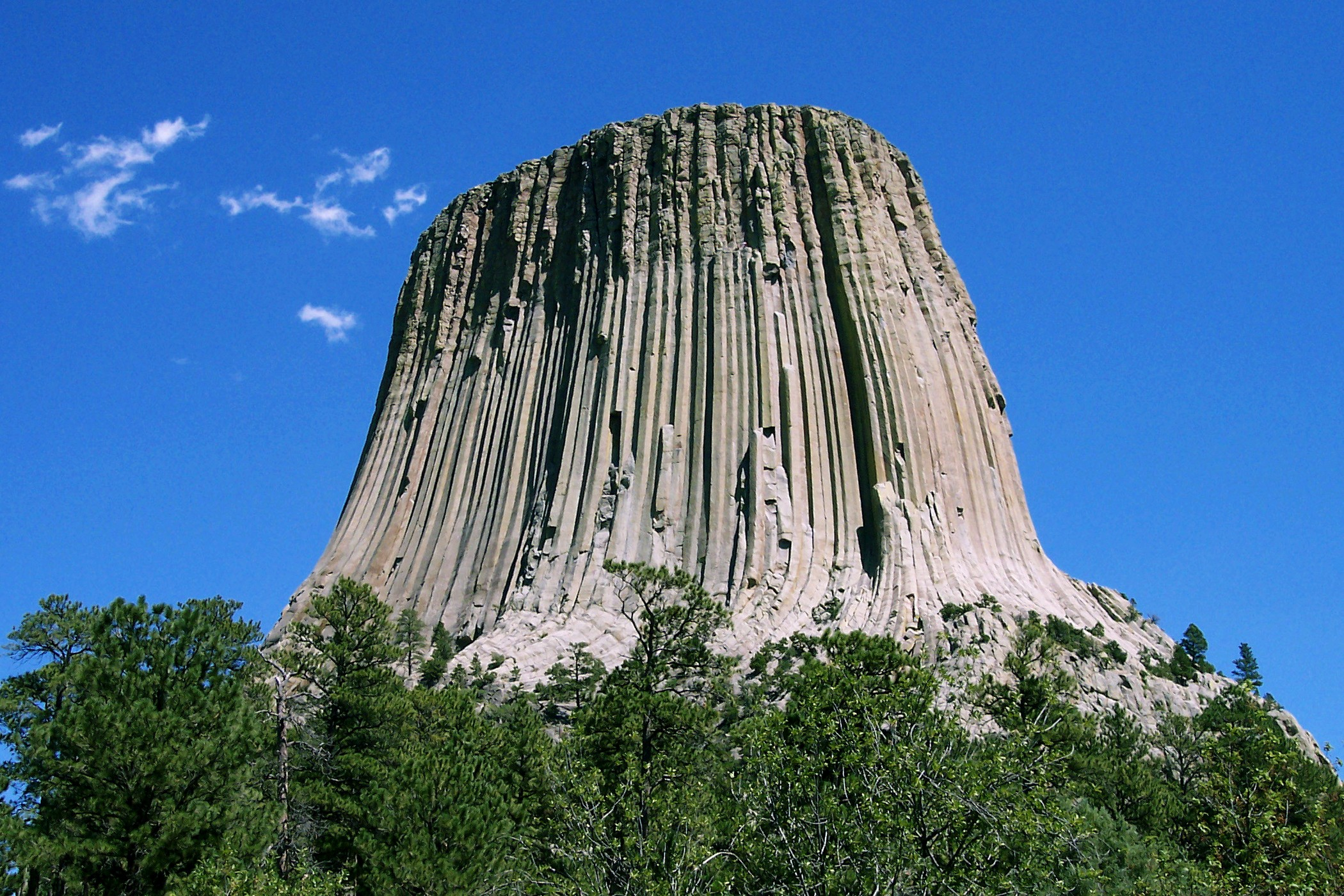
Devils Tower (Mato Tipila)

- Dams in Wyoming
- Demographics of Wyoming
- Devils Tower National Monument

== E ==
- Economy of Wyoming
  - Category:Economy of Wyoming
    - commons:Category:Economy of Wyoming
- Education in Wyoming
  - Category:Education in Wyoming
    - commons:Category:Education in Wyoming
- Elections in Wyoming
  - commons:Category:Elections in Wyoming
- Energy resource facilities in Wyoming
- Environment of Wyoming:
  - Category:Environment of Wyoming
  - commons:Category:Environment of Wyoming
- Equal Rights (motto)

== F ==
The Flag of the State of Wyoming

- Federal lands in Wyoming
- Fictional cities and towns in Wyoming
- Films set in Wyoming
- Flag of Wyoming
- Flora of Wyoming
- Forkwood (soil) website
- Forts in Wyoming
  - Fort Laramie
  - Category:Forts in Wyoming
    - commons:Category:Forts in Wyoming
- Fossil Butte National Monument
- Fremont County

== G ==
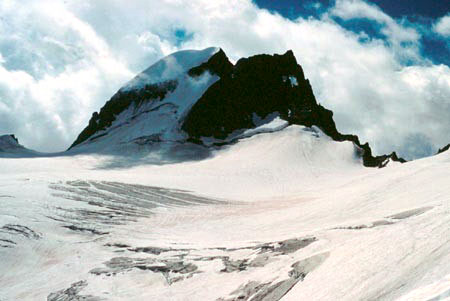
Gannett Peak

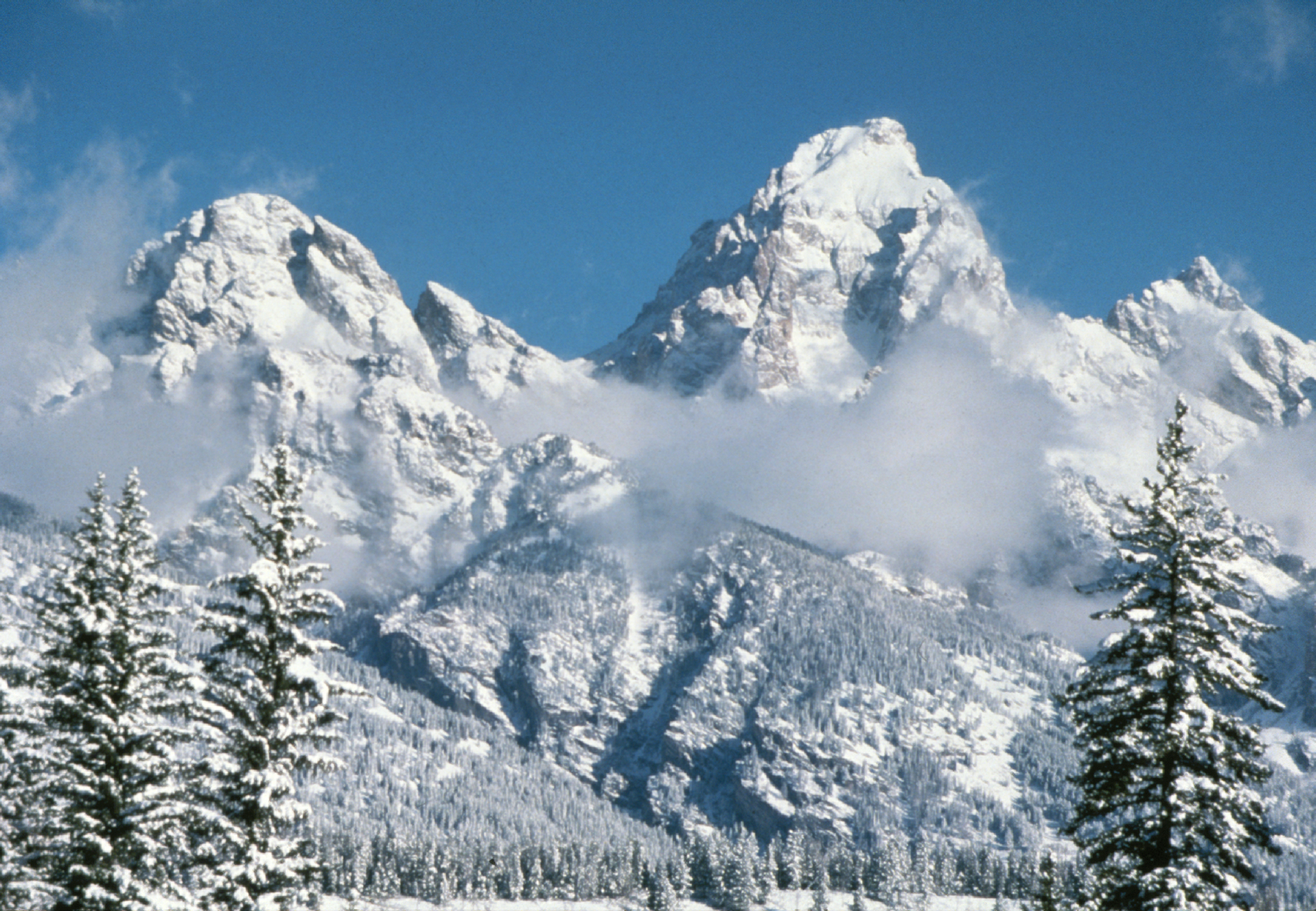
Grand Teton in winter

The Great Seal of the State of Wyoming

- Gangs in Wyoming
- Gannett Peak
- Geography of Wyoming
  - Category:Geography of Wyoming
    - commons:Category:Geography of Wyoming
- Geology of Wyoming
  - commons:Category:Geology of Wyoming
- George Floyd protests in Wyoming
- Geysers of Wyoming
  - commons:Category:Geysers of Wyoming
- Ghost towns in Wyoming
  - Category:Ghost towns in Wyoming
    - commons:Category:Ghost towns in Wyoming
- Glaciers of Wyoming
  - commons:Category:Glaciers of Wyoming
- Golf clubs and courses in Wyoming
- Goshen County
- Government of Wyoming website
  - Category:Government of Wyoming
    - commons:Category:Government of Wyoming
  - List of governors of Wyoming
  - Wyoming Governor's Mansion
- Grand Canyon of the Yellowstone
- Grand Teton
- Grand Teton National Park
- Great Basin
- Great Plains
- Great Seal of the State of Wyoming
- Green River

== H ==
- High Plains
- High Plains Uranium
- High schools in Wyoming
- Highway routes in Wyoming
- Hiking trails in Wyoming
  - commons:Category:Hiking trails in Wyoming
- History of Wyoming
  - Historical outline of Wyoming
    - Category:History of Wyoming
      - commons:Category:History of Wyoming
- Horned lizard
- Hot Springs County
- Hot springs of Wyoming
  - commons:Category:Hot springs of Wyoming
- Houses in Wyoming

== I ==
- Images of Wyoming
  - commons:Category:Wyoming
- Islands in Wyoming

== J ==
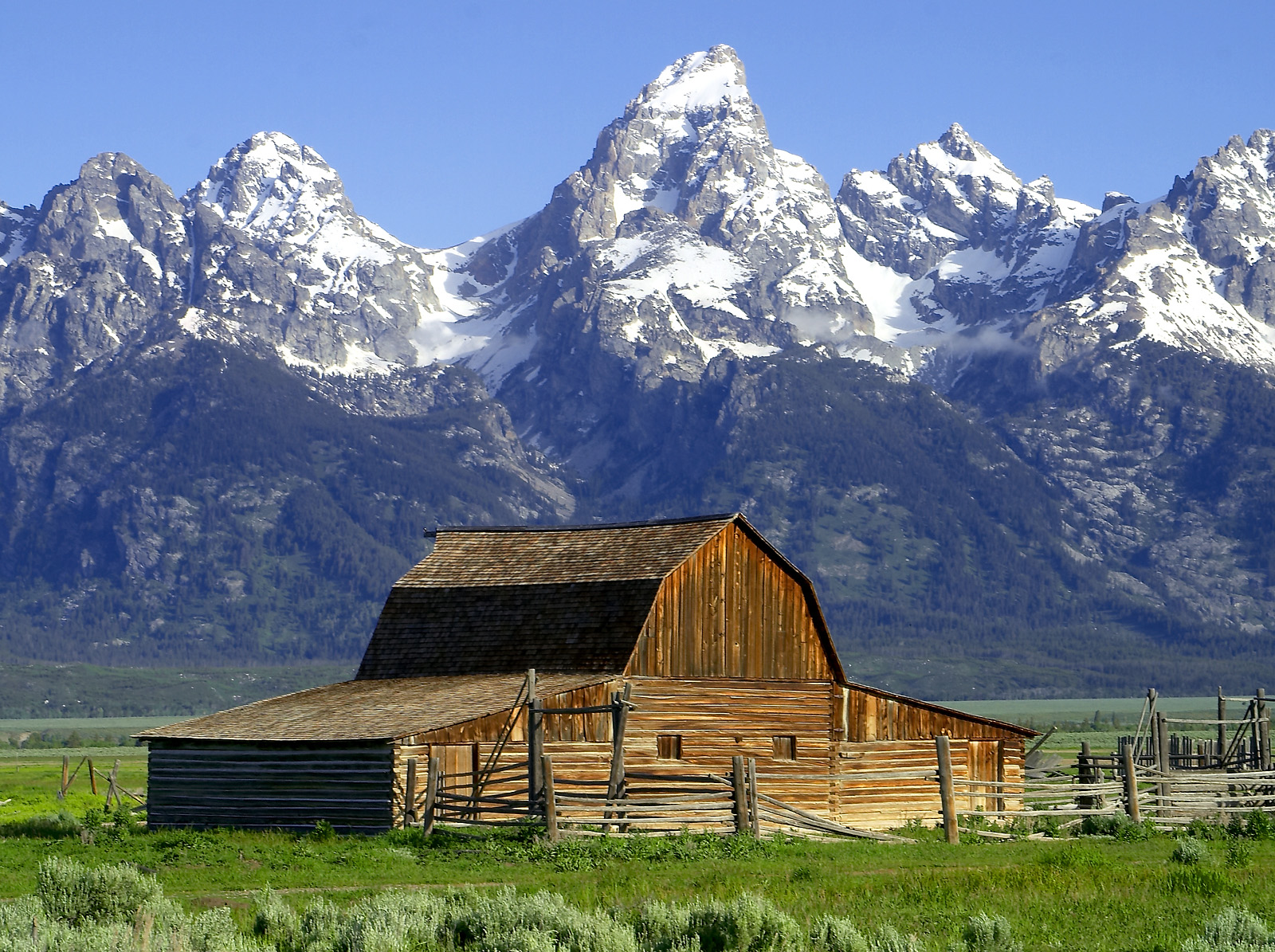
Jackson Hole with the Teton Range in the background

- Jackson Hole
- John D. Rockefeller, Jr. Memorial Parkway
- Johnson County

== K ==
- Knightia

== L ==
- Lakes of Wyoming
  - commons:Category:Lakes of Wyoming
- Landforms of Wyoming
- Landmarks in Wyoming
  - commons:Category:Landmarks in Wyoming
- Laramie County
- Laramie Peak
- Laramie Range
- Laramie River
- Law and government of Wyoming
- Law enforcement agencies in Wyoming
- Law schools in Wyoming
- Legislature of Wyoming
  - Wyoming Senate
  - Wyoming House of Representatives
  - Category:Members of the Wyoming Legislature
- Lincoln County
- Lists related to Wyoming:
  - List of airports in Wyoming
  - List of bridges on the National Register of Historic Places in Wyoming
  - List of census statistical areas in Wyoming
  - List of cities in Wyoming
  - List of colleges and universities in Wyoming
  - List of counties in Wyoming
  - List of dams and reservoirs in Wyoming
  - List of forts in Wyoming
  - List of ghost towns in Wyoming
  - List of governors of Wyoming
  - List of high schools in Wyoming
  - List of highway routes in Wyoming
  - List of islands in Wyoming
  - List of lakes in Wyoming
  - List of law enforcement agencies in Wyoming
  - List of museums in Wyoming
  - List of National Historic Landmarks in Wyoming
  - List of newspapers in Wyoming
  - List of people from Wyoming
  - List of power stations in Wyoming
  - List of radio stations in Wyoming
  - List of rivers of Wyoming
  - List of school districts in Wyoming
  - List of Wyoming companies
  - List of Wyoming's congressional delegations
  - List of Wyoming's congressional districts
  - List of state prisons of Wyoming
  - List of telephone area codes in Wyoming
  - List of television stations in Wyoming
  - List of United States representatives from Wyoming
  - List of United States senators from Wyoming
  - National Register of Historic Places listings in Wyoming
  - Louisiana Purchase of 1803

== M ==
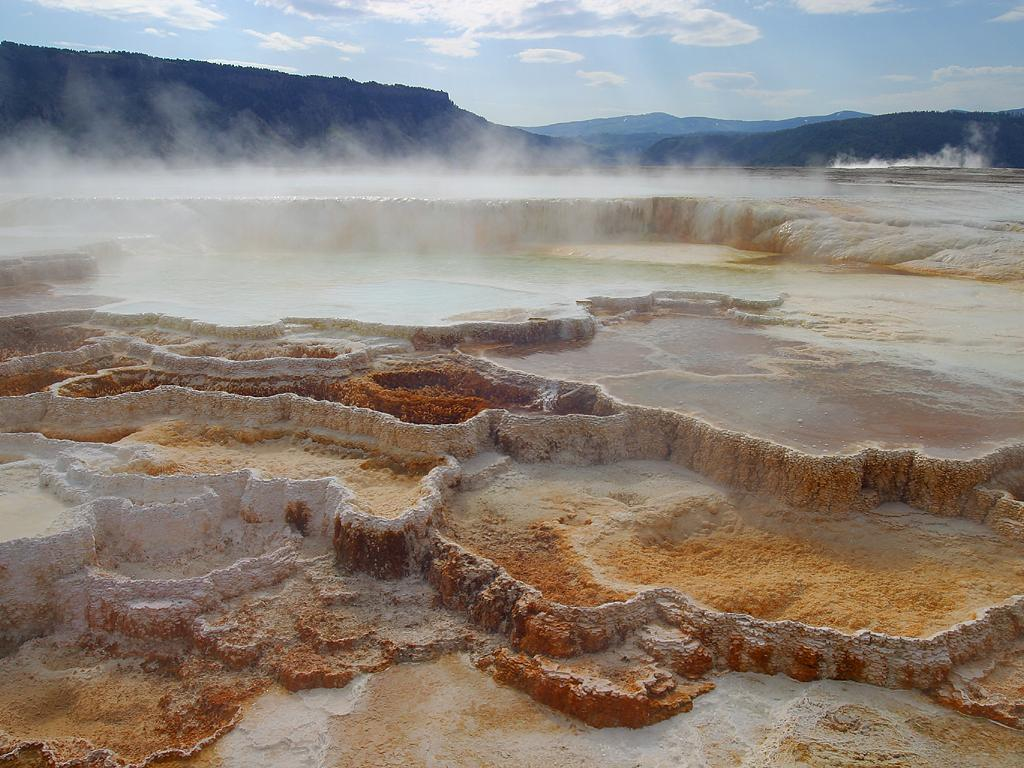
Mammoth Hot Springs in Yellowstone National Park

- Mammoth Hot Springs
- Maps of Wyoming
  - commons:Category:Maps of Wyoming
- Mass media in Wyoming
- Metropolitan areas of Wyoming
  - Metropolitan areas in Wyoming
  - Micropolitan statistical areas of Wyoming
- Military in Wyoming
- Mormon Trail
- Mountains of Wyoming
  - Mountain peaks of the Rocky Mountains
  - commons:Category:Mountains of Wyoming
- Mountain passes in Wyoming
- Mountain ranges in Wyoming
- Museums in Wyoming
  - Category:Museums in Wyoming
    - commons:Category:Museums in Wyoming
- Music of Wyoming
  - Category:Music of Wyoming
    - commons:Category:Music of Wyoming
  - Category:Musical groups from Wyoming
  - Category:Musicians from Wyoming

== N ==
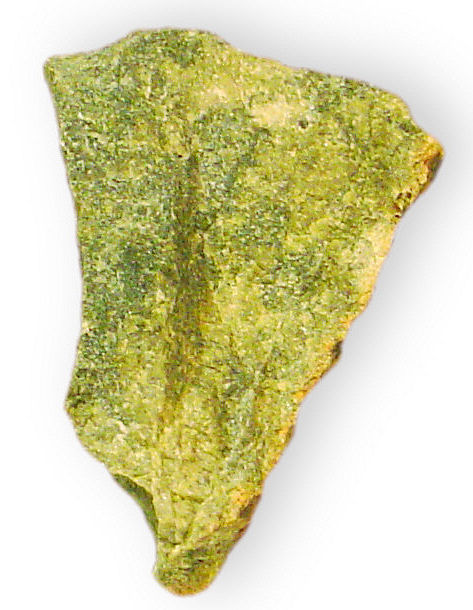
Native Wyoming nephrite

- National forests of Wyoming
  - commons:Category:National Forests of Wyoming
- National Historic Landmarks in Wyoming
  - Category:National Historic Landmarks in Wyoming
- National Natural Landmarks in Wyoming
- National parks in Wyoming
- National Wildlife Refuges in Wyoming
- Natrona County
- Natural arches of Wyoming
  - commons:Category:Natural arches of Wyoming
- Natural disasters in Wyoming
- Natural gas pipelines in Wyoming
- Natural history of Wyoming
  - commons:Category:Natural history of Wyoming
- Nephrite
- Newspapers in Wyoming
  - Category:Newspapers published in Wyoming
- Nez Perce War
- Niobrara County
- North Platte River

== O ==
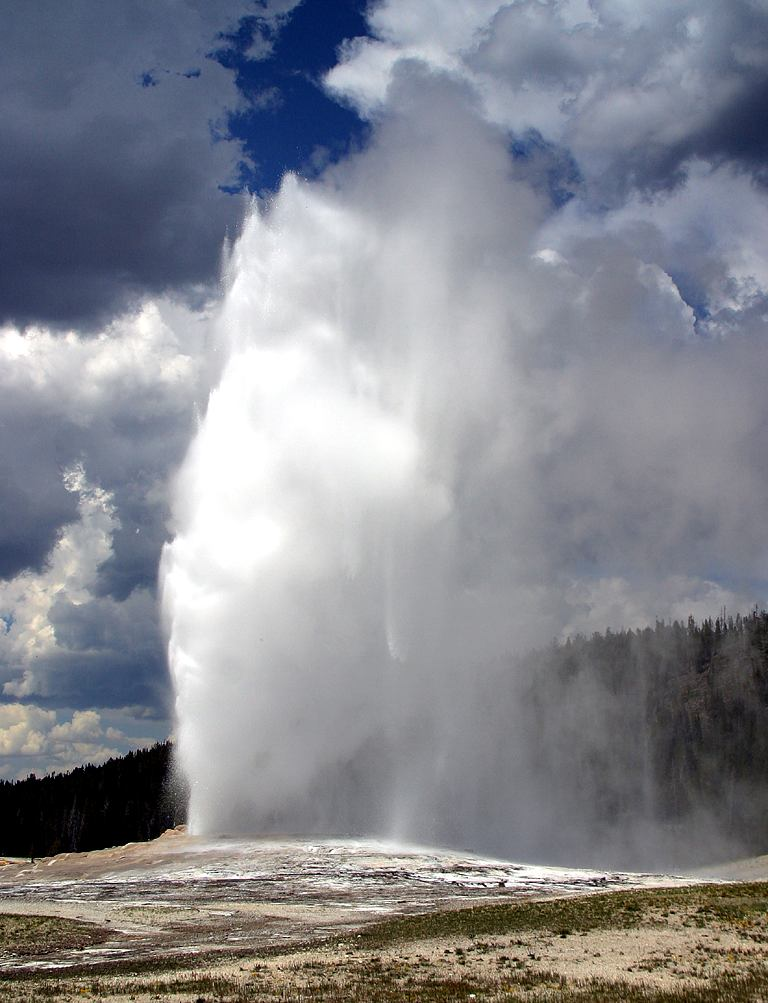
Old Faithful Geyser in Yellowstone National Park

- Old Faithful Geyser
- Oncorhynchus clarkii
- Oregon Country
- Oregon Trail
- Oregon Treaty of 1846

== P ==
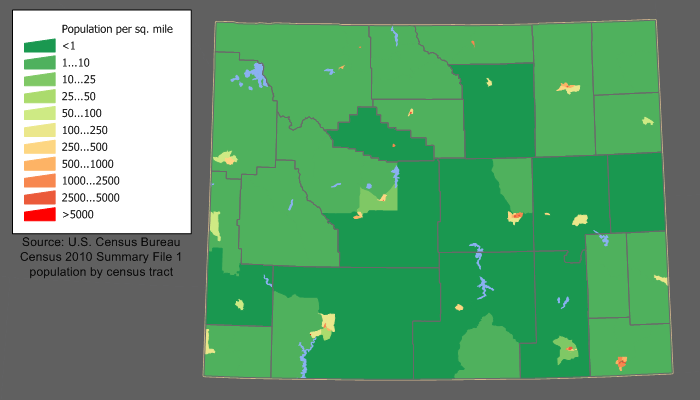
An enlargeable population density map of Wyoming

- Park County
- Parks in Wyoming
- Pascopyrum smithii
- People from Wyoming
  - Category:People from Wyoming
    - commons:Category:People from Wyoming
    - Category:People from Wyoming by populated place
    - Category:People from Wyoming by county
    - Category:People from Wyoming by occupation
- Phrynosoma douglassi brevirostre
- Wyoming places ranked by per capita income
- Plains cottonwood
- Platte County
- Politics of Wyoming
  - commons:Category:Politics of Wyoming
- Populus sargentii
- Powder River Country
- Prisons of Wyoming
  - Category:Prisons in Wyoming
- Protected areas of Wyoming
  - commons:Category:Protected areas of Wyoming

== R ==
- Radio stations in Wyoming
- Railroad museums in Wyoming
  - commons:Category:Railroad museums in Wyoming
- Red Cloud's War
- Red Desert (Wyoming)
- Regions of Wyoming
- Registered Historic Places in Wyoming
- Religion in Wyoming
  - Category:Religion in Wyoming
    - commons:Category:Religion in Wyoming
- Rivers of Wyoming
  - Category:Rivers of Wyoming
- Rock formations in Wyoming
- Rockefeller Memorial Parkway
- Rock formations in Wyoming
  - commons:Category:Rock formations in Wyoming
- Rocky Mountains
- Rodeo

== S ==
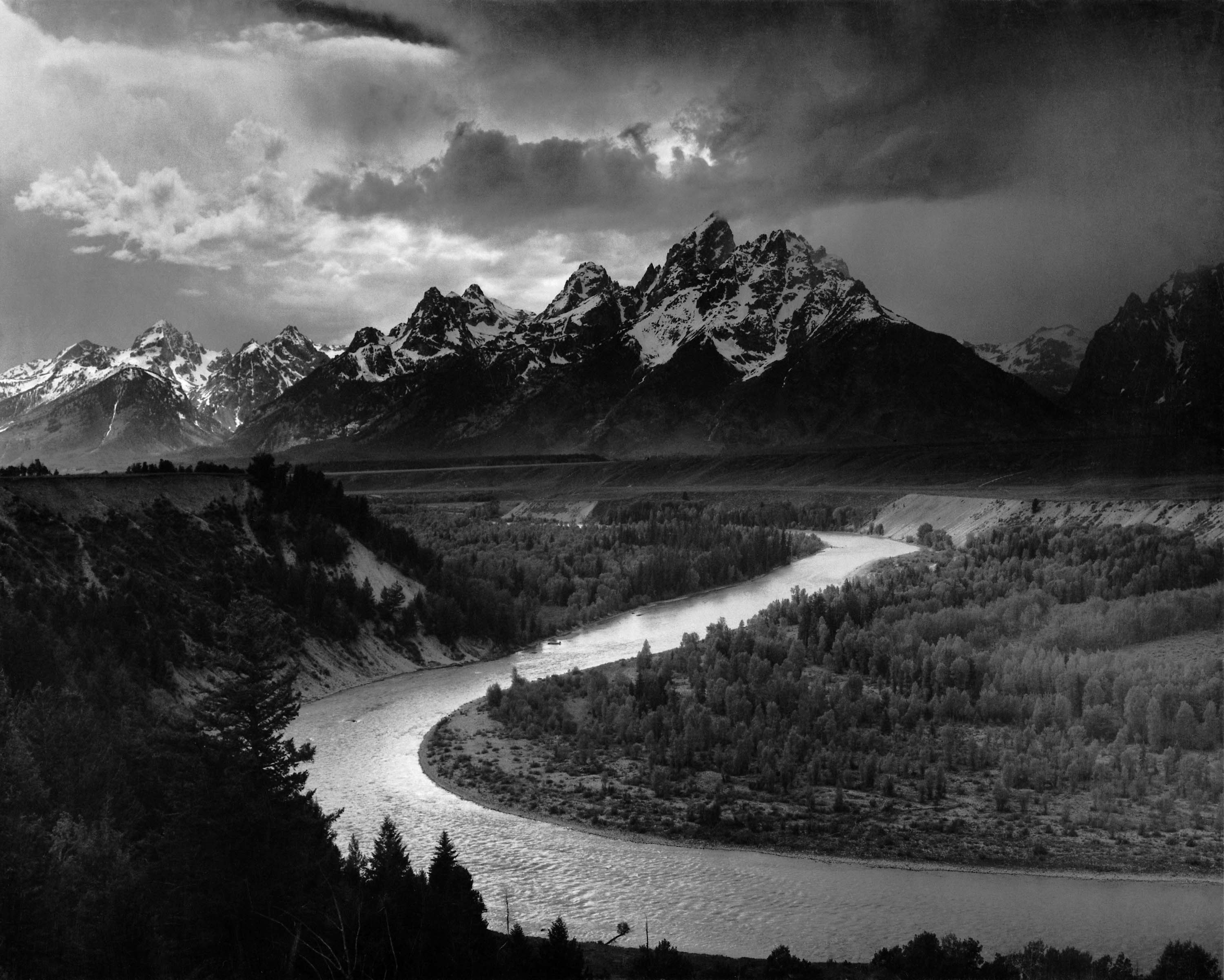
The Snake River in Wyoming by Ansel Adams, 1948

- Sacagawea dollar
- School districts in Wyoming
  - Category:School districts in Wyoming
- Scouting in Wyoming
- Settlements in Wyoming
  - Cities in Wyoming
  - Towns in Wyoming
  - Census-designated places in Wyoming
  - Other unincorporated communities in Wyoming
  - List of ghost towns in Wyoming
- Sheridan County
- Sheep wagon
- Shopping malls in Wyoming
- Ski areas and resorts in Wyoming
  - commons:Category:Ski areas and resorts in Wyoming
- Snake River
- Solar power in Wyoming
- South Pass (Wyoming)
- Sports in Wyoming
  - Category:Sports in Wyoming
    - commons:Category:Sports in Wyoming
  - Category:Sports venues in Wyoming
    - commons:Category:Sports venues in Wyoming
- State parks of Wyoming
- Structures in Wyoming
  - commons:Category:Buildings and structures in Wyoming
- Sturnella neglecta
- Supreme Court of Wyoming
- State symbols:
  - Wyoming state bird
  - Wyoming state coin
  - Wyoming state dinosaur
  - Wyoming state emblem
  - Wyoming state fish
  - Wyoming state flag
  - Wyoming state flower
  - Wyoming state fossil
  - Wyoming state gemstone
  - Wyoming state grass
  - Wyoming state mammal
  - Wyoming state motto
  - Wyoming state nickname
  - Wyoming state reptile
  - Wyoming state seal
  - Wyoming state soil website
  - Wyoming state song
  - Wyoming state sport
  - Wyoming state tree
- Sublette County
- Sweetwater County

== T ==
- Telecommunications in Wyoming
  - commons:Category:Communications in Wyoming
- Television shows set in Wyoming
- Telephone area codes in Wyoming
- Television stations in Wyoming
- Territories:
  - Dakota Territory, (1861–1863)-(1864–1868)-1889
  - Idaho Territory, (1863–1868)-1890
  - Louisiana Territory, 1805–1812
  - Missouri Territory, 1812–1821
  - Nebraska Territory, (1854–1863)-1867
  - Oregon Territory, (1848–1853)-1859
  - Utah Territory, (1850–1868)-1896
  - Washington Territory, (1853–1863)-1889
  - Wyoming Territory, 1868–1890
- Teton County
- Teton Range
- Tourism in Wyoming website
  - commons:Category:Tourism in Wyoming
- Towns in Wyoming
- Triceratops
- Transportation in Wyoming
  - Category:Transportation in Wyoming
    - commons:Category:Transport in Wyoming
- Treaty of Guadalupe Hidalgo of 1848

== U ==
- Unincorporated communities in Wyoming
- Uinta County
- Uinta Mountains
- United States of America
  - States of the United States of America
  - United States census statistical areas of Wyoming
  - Wyoming's congressional delegations
  - United States congressional district of Wyoming
  - United States Court of Appeals for the Tenth Circuit
  - United States District Court for the District of Wyoming
  - United States representatives from Wyoming
  - United States senators from Wyoming
- Universities and colleges in Wyoming
  - Category:Universities and colleges in Wyoming
- University of Wyoming
- Uranium mining in Wyoming
- US-WY – ISO 3166-2:US region code for Wyoming

== V ==
- Valleys of Wyoming
- Volcanoes of Wyoming

== W ==
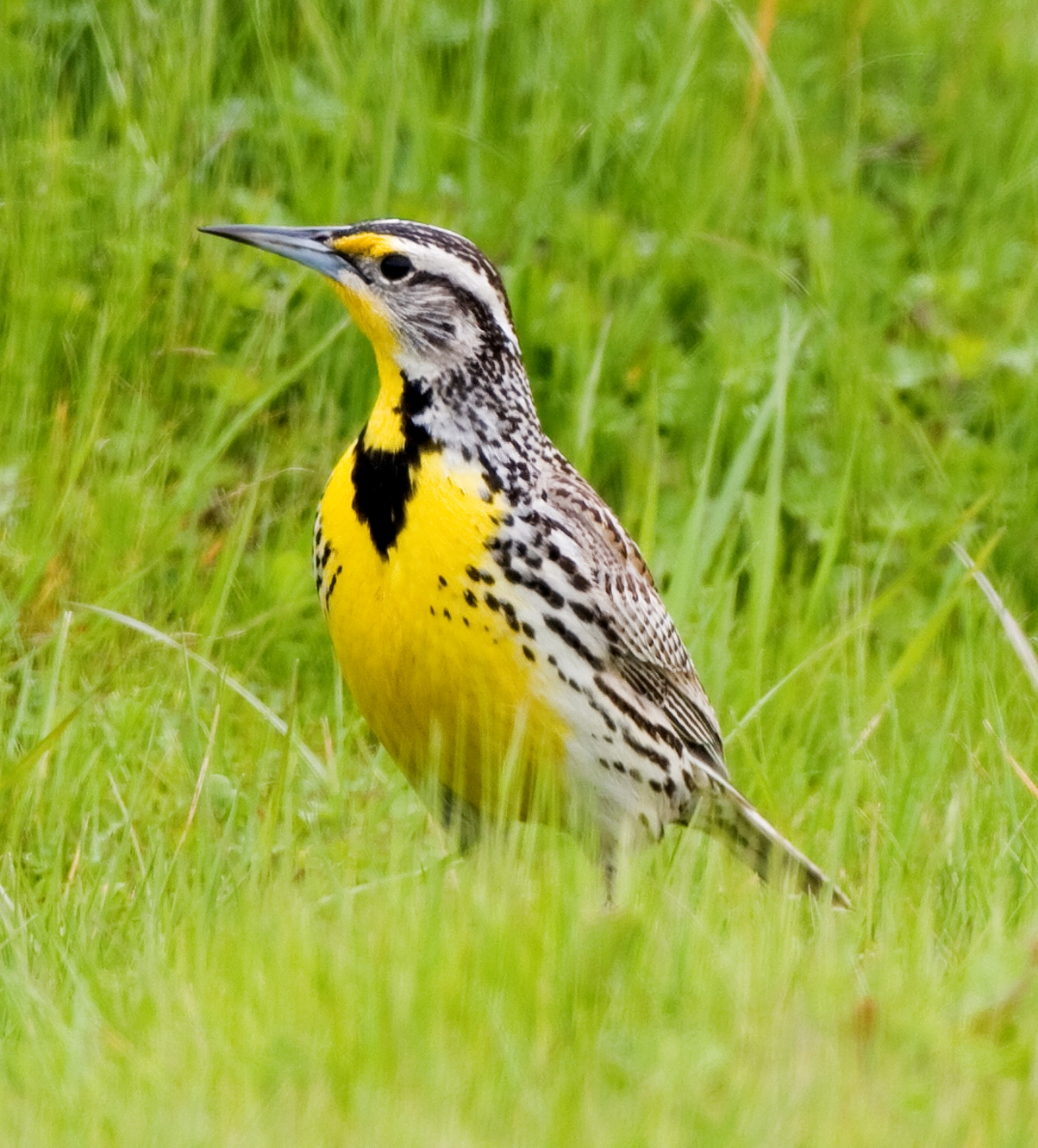
Western meadowlark

- Washakie County
- Waterfalls of Wyoming
  - commons:Category:Waterfalls of Wyoming
- Watersheds in Wyoming
- Western meadowlark
- Western wheatgrass
- Weston County
  Wikimedia
  - Wikimedia Commons:Category:Wyoming
    - commons:Category:Maps of Wyoming
  - Wikinews:Category:Wyoming
    - Wikinews:Portal:Wyoming
  - Wikipedia Category:Wyoming
    - Wikipedia:WikiProject Wyoming
      - Category:WikiProject Wyoming articles
      - Category:WikiProject Wyoming participants
- Wilderness areas in Wyoming
- Wind power in Wyoming
- Wind River Peak
- Wind River Range
- Writers of Wyoming
- WY – United States Postal Service postal code for Wyoming
- Wyoming website
  - Category:Wyoming
    - commons:Category:Wyoming
      - commons:Category:Maps of Wyoming
- Wyoming (song)
- Wyoming Community Foundation
- Wyoming Contractors Association
- Wyoming Cowboys soccer
- Wyoming Department of Revenue
- Wyoming Governor's Mansion
- Wyoming Indian paintbrush
- Wyoming Writers, Inc.
- Wyoming State Capital
- Wyoming State Capitol
- Wyoming state prisons
- Wyoming Supreme Court
- Wyoming Territory
- Wyoming Workforce Development Council

== Y ==
- Yellowstone Caldera
- Yellowstone Falls
- Yellowstone Lake
- Yellowstone National Park
- Yellowstone River
- Yellowstone Park bison herd

== See also ==
- Topic overview:
  - Wyoming
  - Outline of Wyoming
