= Outline of Wyoming =

U.S. state

The flag of Wyoming

The seal of Wyoming

The location of the state of Wyoming in the United States of America

The following outline is provided as an overview of and topical guide to the U.S. state of Wyoming:

Wyoming – U.S. state in the mountain region of the Western United States. The western two thirds of the state is covered mostly with the mountain ranges and rangelands in the foothills of the Eastern Rocky Mountains, while the eastern third of the state is high elevation prairie known as the High Plains. Wyoming is the least populous U.S. state, with a U.S. Census population of 563,626 in 2010.

== General reference ==
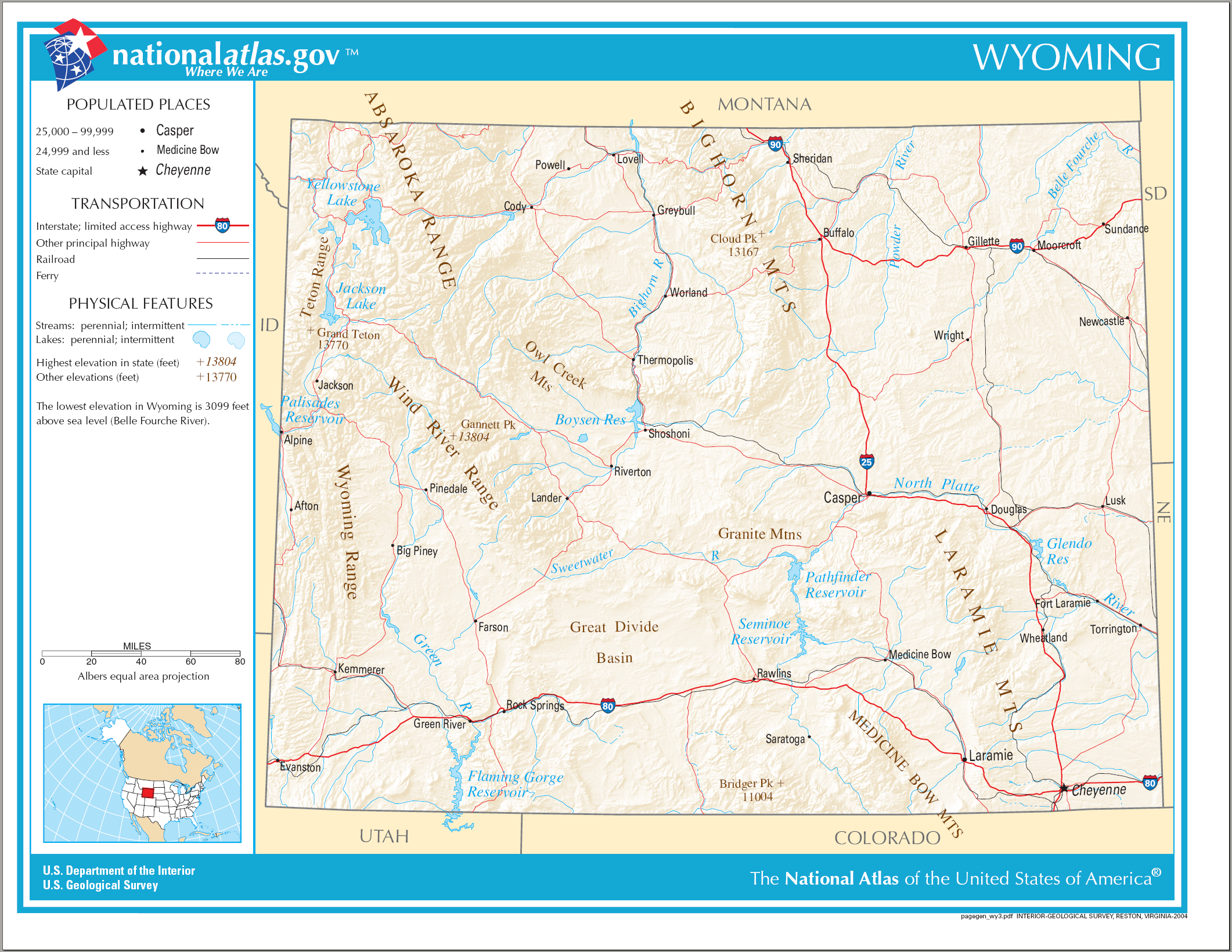
An enlargeable map of the state of Wyoming

- Names
  - Common name: Wyoming
    - Pronunciation: /waɪˈoʊmɪŋ/
  - Official name: State of Wyoming
  - Abbreviations and name codes
    - Postal symbol: WY
    - ISO 3166-2 code: US-WY
    - Internet second-level domain: .wy.us
  - Nicknames
    - Cowboy State
    - Equality State
    - Park State
    - Forever West (On highway welcome signs)
- Adjectival: Wyoming
- Demonym: Wyomingite

== Geography of Wyoming ==
Geography of Wyoming

- Wyoming is: a U.S. state, a federal state of the United States of America
- Location
  - Northern Hemisphere
  - Western Hemisphere
    - Americas
      - North America
        - Anglo America
        - Northern America
          - United States of America
            - Contiguous United States
              - Western United States
                - Mountain West United States
                - Northwestern United States
- Population of Wyoming: 563,626 (2010 U.S. Census)
- Area of Wyoming: 97,813 sq mi (253,335 km^{2})
- Atlas of Wyoming

=== Places in Wyoming ===
- Historic places in Wyoming
  - National Historic Landmarks in Wyoming
  - National Register of Historic Places listings in Wyoming
    - Bridges on the National Register of Historic Places in Wyoming
- National Natural Landmarks in Wyoming
- National parks in Wyoming
- State parks in Wyoming

=== Environment of Wyoming ===
Environment of Wyoming

- Climate of Wyoming
- Geology of Wyoming
  - Volcanism of Wyoming
- Superfund sites in Wyoming
- Wildlife of Wyoming
  - Fauna of Wyoming
    - Birds of Wyoming
    - Mammals of Wyoming

==== Natural geographic features of Wyoming ====
- Rivers of Wyoming

=== Regions of Wyoming ===
==== Administrative divisions of Wyoming ====
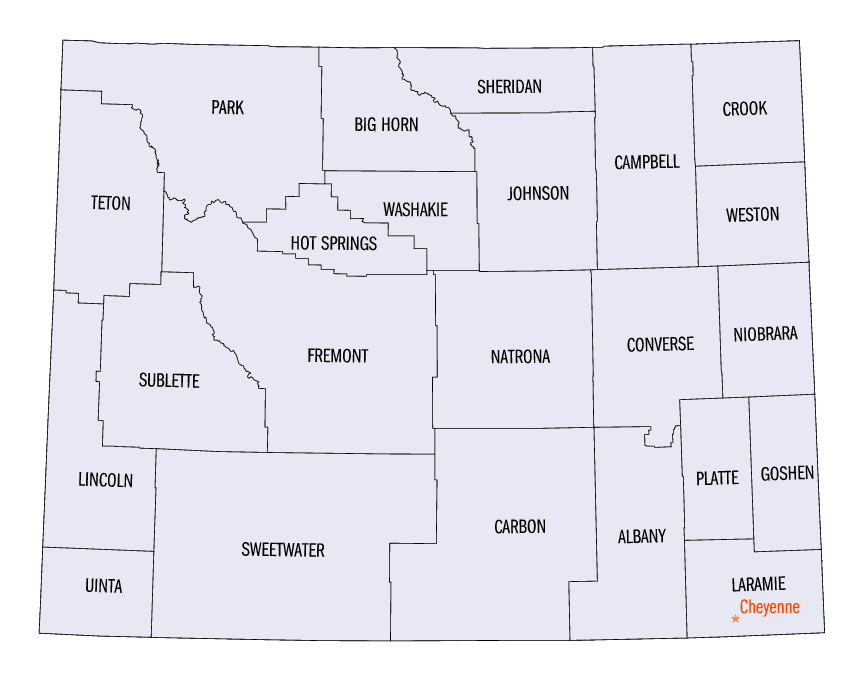
An enlargeable map of the 23 counties of the state of Wyoming

- The 23 counties of the state of Wyoming
  - Municipalities in Wyoming
    - Cities in Wyoming
      - State capital of Wyoming: Cheyenne
      - Largest city in Wyoming: Cheyenne
      - City nicknames in Wyoming
    - Unincorporated communities in Wyoming
  - Census-designated places in Wyoming

=== Demography of Wyoming ===
Demographics of Wyoming

== Government and politics of Wyoming ==
Politics of Wyoming

- Form of government: U.S. state government
- Wyoming's congressional delegations
- Wyoming State Capitol
- Elections in Wyoming
  - Electoral reform in Wyoming
- Political party strength in Wyoming

=== Branches of the government of Wyoming ===
Government of Wyoming

==== Executive branch of the government of Wyoming ====
- Governor of Wyoming
  - Lieutenant Governor of Wyoming
  - Secretary of State of Wyoming
- State departments
  - Wyoming Department of Transportation

==== Legislative branch of the government of Wyoming ====
- Wyoming Legislature (bicameral)
  - Upper house: Wyoming Senate
  - Lower house: Wyoming House of Representatives

==== Judicial branch of the government of Wyoming ====
Courts of Wyoming

- Supreme Court of Wyoming

=== Law and order in Wyoming ===
Law of Wyoming

- Adoption in Wyoming
- Cannabis in Wyoming
- Capital punishment in Wyoming
  - Individuals executed in Wyoming
- Constitution of Wyoming
- Crime in Wyoming
  - Organized crime in Wyoming
- Gun laws in Wyoming
- Law enforcement in Wyoming
  - Law enforcement agencies in Wyoming
    - Wyoming Highway Patrol
  - Prisons in Wyoming
- Same-sex marriage in Wyoming

=== Military in Wyoming ===
Wyoming Military Department

- Wyoming Air National Guard
- Wyoming Army National Guard

== History of Wyoming ==
History of Wyoming

=== History of Wyoming, by period ===
- Prehistory of Wyoming
  - Indigenous peoples
- French colony of Louisiane east of Continental Divide, 1699–1764
  - Treaty of Fontainebleau of 1762
- Spanish (though predominantly Francophone) district of Alta Luisiana east of Continental Divide, 1764–1803
  - Third Treaty of San Ildefonso of 1800
- French district of Haute-Louisiane east of Continental Divide, 1803
  - Louisiana Purchase of 1803
- Unorganized U.S. territory created by the Louisiana Purchase east of Continental Divide, 1803–1804
- District of Louisiana east of Continental Divide, 1804–1805
- Territory of Louisiana east of Continental Divide, 1805–1812
- Territory of Missouri east of Continental Divide, 1812–1821
  - War of 1812, June 18, 1812 – March 23, 1815
    - Treaty of Ghent, December 24, 1814
- Oregon Country west of Continental Divide, 1818–1846
  - Anglo-American Convention of 1818
  - Oregon Trail, 1841–1869
  - California Trail, 1841–1869
  - Provisional Government of Oregon, 1843–1848
  - Oregon Treaty of 1846
- Spanish colony of Santa Fé de Nuevo Méjico south of the 42nd parallel north and west of 106°10'42"W, 1598-(1819–1821)
  - Adams–Onís Treaty of 1819
  - Treaty of Córdoba of 1821
- Unorganized Territory east of Continental Divide, 1821–1854
  - Treaty of Fort Laramie of 1851
- Mexican territory of Santa Fé de Nuevo México south of the 42nd parallel north and west of 106°10'42"W, 1821–1846
  - Territorial claims of the Republic of Texas south of the 42nd parallel north between 106°10'42"W and 107°23'33"W, 1836–1845
- Mexican–American War, April 25, 1846 – February 2, 1848
  - Mormon Trail, 1847–1869
  - Treaty of Guadalupe Hidalgo, February 2, 1848
- Territory of Oregon, 1848–1859
- State of Deseret (extralegal), 1849–1850
- Territory of Utah, (1850–1868)-1896
- Territory of Washington, 1853-(1859–1863)-1889
- Territory of Nebraska, (1854–1863)-1867
  - Pony Express, 1860–1861
  - American Civil War, April 12, 1861 – May 13, 1865
  - First Transcontinental Telegraph completed 1861
- Territory of Jefferson (extralegal), 1859–1861
- Territory of Dakota, 1861-(1864–1868)-1889
  - Red Cloud's War, 1866–1868
- Territory of Idaho, (1863–1868)-1890
- Territory of Wyoming, 1868–1890
  - Treaty of Fort Laramie of 1868
  - History of women's suffrage in Wyoming since 1869
  - First transcontinental railroad completed 1869
  - Powell Geographic Expedition of 1869
  - Yellowstone National Park designated first United States National Park on March 1, 1872
  - Nez Perce War, 1877
- State of Wyoming becomes 44th state admitted to the United States of America on July 10, 1890
  - Grand Teton National Park established on February 26, 1929

=== History of Wyoming, by subject ===
- Territorial evolution of Wyoming
- Uranium mining in Wyoming

== Culture of Wyoming ==
Culture of Wyoming

- Museums in Wyoming
- Religion in Wyoming
  - The Church of Jesus Christ of Latter-day Saints in Wyoming
  - Episcopal Diocese of Wyoming
- Scouting in Wyoming
- State symbols of Wyoming
  - Flag of the state of Wyoming
  - Great Seal of the State of Wyoming

=== The arts in Wyoming ===
- Music of Wyoming

=== Sports in Wyoming ===
Sports in Wyoming

== Economy and infrastructure of Wyoming ==
Economy of Wyoming

- Communications in Wyoming
  - Newspapers in Wyoming
  - Radio stations in Wyoming
  - Television stations in Wyoming
- Energy in Wyoming
  - Power stations in Wyoming
  - Solar power in Wyoming
  - Wind power in Wyoming
- Health care in Wyoming
  - Hospitals in Wyoming
- Mining in Wyoming
  - Coal mining in Wyoming
  - Uranium mining in Wyoming
- Transportation in Wyoming
  - Airports in Wyoming
  - Roads in Wyoming
    - State highways in Wyoming

== Education in Wyoming ==
Education in Wyoming

- Schools in Wyoming
  - School districts in Wyoming
    - High schools in Wyoming
  - Colleges and universities in Wyoming
    - University of Wyoming
    - Wyoming Catholic College

== See also ==
- Topic overview:
  - Wyoming
  - Index of Wyoming-related articles
