= Fred Schmalz =

American soccer coach

Personal information
- Date of birth: 1943 (age 82–83)
- Place of birth: St. Louis, Missouri, United States

Youth career
- Years: Team
- 1964–1966: Quincy Hawks

Managerial career
- 1969–1970: Wyoming
- 1970–72: Davis & Elkins Senators (assistant)
- 1973–78: Davis & Elkins Senators
- 1979–2002: Evansville Purple Aces

Fred Schmalz is a retired American soccer coach. He coached at the collegiate level for 33 years. He was a National Coach of the Year and has been named to six Halls of Fame for his play and his coaching successes.

== Career ==
A native of St. Louis, Missouri, Schmalz is a graduate of Quincy College, in Quincy, Illinois, where he played on the school's first intercollegiate team in 1964 and was a member of the 1966 team that won the first of Quincy's record eleven NAIA National Championships.

Following his graduation from Quincy, Schmalz was a physical education instructor at the University of Wyoming before becoming an assistant coach at Davis & Elkins College in Elkins, West Virginia. After three seasons, he was named Davis & Elkins' head coach in 1973, and in six seasons, led the team to a record of 91–21–5 and six NAIA tournaments, including a second-place finish in 1974.

In 1979, Schmalz was named the third head coach of the University of Evansville Purple Aces in Evansville, Indiana. In eight seasons as an independent, seven as a member of the Midwestern City/Midwestern Collegiate Conference, and nine as a member of the Missouri Valley Conference, Schmalz' Purple Aces teams built a record of 302–165–49, won six conference tournaments (5 MCC, 1 MVC), and advanced to the NCAA Division I Men's Soccer Championship eleven times, including nine years in a row from 1984 through 1992, with third-place finishes in the NCAA College Cup in 1985 and 1990. Among the players Schmalz mentored at Evansville were 13 All-Americans, 17 Academic All-Americans, and 31 who went on to play professionally.

In addition to his collegiate coaching, Schmalz was a U.S. Soccer Federation national staff coach and coached in six Olympic Sports Festivals.

Although "retired," Schmalz has continued to work with youth soccer in Evansville.

== Honors ==
1985 Soccer America College Coach of the Year.

1988 Bill Jeffrey Award from the National Soccer Coaches Association of America (NSCAA) "...recognizing long-term service to collegiate soccer."

Schmalz was the recipient of the first Ron Wigg Award in 1998—the highest honor presented by the U.S. Olympic Development Program.

Schmalz was the first to coach gold medal-winning soccer teams from separate regions in the U.S. Olympic Sports Festival, coaching the West in 1990 and the North in 1991.

Quincy Hawks Hall of Fame Class of 1993.

The Indiana Soccer Hall of Fame Class of 1997.

Davis & Elkins College Athletic Hall of Fame Class of 2003.

University of Evansville Athletics Hall of Fame class of 2003–04.

Saint Louis Soccer Hall of Fame Class of 2009.

The Missouri Valley Conference Hall of Fame Class of 2011.
