= List of Wyoming state symbols =

Location of the state of Wyoming in the United States of America

The following is a list of symbols of the U.S. state of Wyoming.

== Insignia ==
Type	Symbol	Image	Adopted
Flag	Flag of the State of Wyoming		1916
Seal	Great Seal of the State of Wyoming		1869
Emblem	Bucking Horse and Rider		1918 (trademarked 1936)
Motto	Equal Rights		1869
Nickname	The Equality State; The Cowboy State		1890; 1974
Slogan	Like No Place on Earth		unofficial

== Wyoming State Code ==
Wyoming enacted the "Code of the West" as the State Code of Wyoming on March 3, 2010. The code includes the following:

1. Live each day with courage;
2. Take pride in your work;
3. Always finish what you start;
4. Do what has to be done;
5. Be tough, but fair;
6. When you make a promise, keep it;
7. Ride for the brand;
8. Talk less, say more;
9. Remember that some things are not for sale;
10. Know where to draw the line.

== Living symbols ==
Type	Symbol	Image	Adopted
Bird	Western meadowlark Sturnella neglecta		1927
Fish	Cutthroat trout Oncorhynchus clarkii		1987
Flower	Wyoming paintbrush Castilleja linariaefolia		1917
Grass	Western wheatgrass Pascopyrum smithii		2007
Insect	Sheridan's green hairstreak butterfly Callophrys sheridanii		2009
Mammal	American bison Bison bison		1985
Reptile	Horned toad Phrynosoma		1993
Tree	Plains cottonwood Populus Sargentii		1947

== Earth symbols ==
Type	Symbol	Image	Adopted
Dinosaur	Triceratops		1994
Fossil	Knightia		1987
Gemstone	Jade		1967
Soil	Forkwood		unofficial

== Cultural symbols ==
Type	Symbol	Image	Adopted
Song	"Wyoming"		1955
Sport	Rodeo		2003

== United States coin ==
Type	Symbol	Image	Coined
Coin	Sacagawea dollar 2000		2004
Quarter dollar	Wyoming quarter 2007		2007
