= Verna Keays =

American artist and flag designer

- Born: Verna Keays; August 16, 1893; Buffalo, Wyoming, U.S.
- Died: October 31, 1982 (aged 89)
- Education: School of the Art Institute of Chicago
- Occupations: artist interior designer
- Spouse: Arthur Keyes
- Children: 2

Verna Keays Keyes (August 16, 1893 – October 31, 1982) was an American artist and interior designer who designed the Flag of Wyoming.

== Early life and education ==
Keays was born on August 16, 1893, in Buffalo, Wyoming, to Estella Keays and Wilbur Parke Keays, an attorney, civic leader and entrepreneur. Her maternal grandfather was a criminal attorney in Ohio.

She graduated from the School of the Art Institute of Chicago in 1916 and was the first student from Wyoming to graduate from the institute.

== Career ==
In 1916, upon graduating, she returned to Wyoming. She won an interior design contest hosted by the Chicago, Burlington, and Quincy Railroad where she decorated a Pullman dining car. Later that year, at the behest of her father, she entered a contest sponsored by the Daughters of the American Revolution to design a state flag for Wyoming. Her design was selected as the winner, out of thirty-seven entries, by Wyoming DAR State Regent Grace Raymond Hebard. Her design became the official Flag of Wyoming on January 31, 1917. Following designing the state flag, she opened an interior design business called Distinctive Designs.

From 1917 to 1919, she worked as a bill clerk for the Wyoming Senate.

In the 1930s, she organized the first Girl Scouts of the USA troup in the Bighorn Mountains.

== Personal life ==
In 1921, she married World War I Marine Corps veteran Arthur Keyes. The couple, lived in Montana and then in Casper, Wyoming. They had two daughters, Betty and Priscilla.

In 1946, Kearny donated her papers to the American Heritage Center at the University of Wyoming.

She died on October 31, 1982.
