= Electoral reform in Wyoming =

Electoral reform in Wyoming refers to efforts to change the voting laws in this U.S. state. Because Wyoming has only one Congressional district, gerrymandering is not a consideration in federal races. In March 2003, Governor Dave Freudenthal signed a bill to allow people convicted of a non-violent first-time felony to apply for restoration of voting rights five years after completion of sentence. Wyoming also has a "no-excuse" absentee ballot policy, meaning that citizens need not provide a reason for requesting an absentee ballot.

== See also ==
- Wyoming Rule
