= Wyoming Contractors Association =

American non-profit trade organization

The Wyoming Contractors Association (WCA) is a nonprofit trade organization, which offers advancement for member employees, promotes the construction industry and ensures a competitive opportunity that benefits all citizens of Wyoming through political involvement, training, safety programs, and career opportunities. The Headquarters are located in Cheyenne, WY.

Katie Legerski is the current executive director.

== WCA & Winifred Read Family Scholarship ==
Distributions from the fund are used to make scholarship grants to students enrolled in the Department of Civil Engineering at the University of Wyoming.
