= Environment of Wyoming =

Wyoming straddles the Continental Divide, and its abrupt topographic relief includes alternating basins and mountain ranges. Major mountain ranges include the Beartooth, Gros Ventre, Teton, Wind River, Bighorn, Sierra Madre, and Medicine Bow. Internal basins and eastern plains are rolling to flat, and in the east are the Great Plains.

Typical vegetation includes sagebrush, greasewood, and saltbush shrubs in the intermountain basins, grasses on the Great Plains, juniper and mountain mahogany in the foothills, and forest and alpine meadows in the mountains.

The state lies within the US Environmental Protection Agency's Region 8.

== Agriculture in Wyoming ==
The state of Wyoming, also known as the Cowboy State, has 30.2 million acres dedicated to farm land alone. Being one of the top agricultural states in the U.S., Wyoming has 11,000 farms with the average farm size being 2,726 acres. “In 2001 agricultural lands in Wyoming produced 652.7 million pounds of beef, 31.2 million pounds of sheep and lamb, 3.0 million bushels of wheat, 7.0 million bushels of barley, 6.4 million bushels of corn, and 1.9 million tons of hay” The top crops grown in Wyoming are hay, barley, wheat, beans, sugar beets, and corn. The largest commodity is by far the beef industry in Wyoming.

=== Farm Land ===
With approximately 30.2 million acres in agricultural production, Wyoming has eight times more land in agricultural production than the national average. About 27.18 million acres (90%) of the total agricultural land in Wyoming is grazing land; and approximately 9% is cropland (Foulke, Coupal, and Taylor 5). The majority of the agricultural land in Wyoming is dedicated to agriculture operations which owns 5,000 or more acres.

=== Livestock ===
In 2008, the beef industry brought in around $599 million. The beef industry is the largest commodity in Wyoming. According to the Western Regional Science Association, in 2001, livestock sales brought in 652.7 million pounds of beef and 31.2 million pounds of sheep and lamb. Sheep ranchers in 2007 brought in 3,124,299 pounds of wool. On a statewide basis Wyoming was ranked fourth on lamb and sheep sales for a total amount of 411,952 head. Also in 2007, inventory was taken and the total hog, horses and colonies of bees was: 107,180 hogs and pigs, 80,476 horses and 45,633 colonies of bees.

=== Crops ===
In Wyoming, the main crops that are grown are: hay, barley, wheat, beans and corn. Bringing in $65 million in 2008, wheat is the largest crop commodity. The second largest crop commodity is barley, bringing in $32 million and $31 million for wheat sales. Nationwide, Wyoming is 8th in barley, 20th in hay and 33rd in wheat production. Approximately 3.0 million bushels of wheat, 7.0 million bushels of barley, 6.4 million bushels of corn, and 1.9 million tons of hay were produced in 2001 alone.

=== Summary ===
Agriculture plays a big role in the state of Wyoming. Land in Wyoming that is related to agriculture takes up about 55 percent of the total land in Wyoming In 2001, agriculture profits were up to $185.6 million in net farm income. This net income of $185.6 million sustained about 12,345 jobs “The State also ranks number 1 in terms of average size of agriculture enterprises and number 8 in terms of total land in agriculture”

== Land Use in Wyoming ==
Due to Wyoming’s low population, land use is available for many different options: from mineral refining, to national forests, national parks, open ranges, state parks, BLM (Bureau of Land Management), and privately owned land. Referring to the NETSTATE website, Wyoming is separated by the Continental Divide, and can be classified into three separate geographical land terms; the Rocky Mountains, the Great Plains, and Intermontane Basins. The major mountain ranges would consist of the Beartooth, Teton, Bighorn, Medicine Bow, Gros Ventre, Wind River, and Sierra Madre, and holds the lowlands of the Great Plains to the east. The US Department of Agriculture counts Wyoming with 22 state parks, four national forests, and one national grassland. This gives Wyoming a vast amount of public land for recreation and wildlife habitat.

=== Green Mountain Common Allotment ===
According to Geoffrey O’Gara of High Country News, The Green Mountain Common Allotment was once one of the largest unfenced open ranges in North America. O’Gara claims the allotment contains over 500,000 acres, split north to south by the Continental Divide, spanning 60 miles by 20 miles and is a mix of private and public land. It is primarily used for grazing by 17 different ranching controls and is considered on the high plains of Wyoming, where the habitat harbors wild horses, cattle, wildlife, shrubbery, and grasslands. The range has recently been getting pressures to divide it, fence it, and prevent grazing damage and protect natural ecosystems, as well as fencing for developments and privatization. Opposition says the Green Mountain Common Allotment needs to stay unfenced not only for sentiment of the “old west,” but also to prevent such things as tangled pronghorn and sage grouse, as once seen in the tragedy of the Red Rim fence disaster.

=== Wyoming Natural Energy and Resources ===
In 2010, the Wyoming Bureau of Land Management released to the public their annual report. In the annual report, they disseminate information about the natural energy and resources held in the state, many in which they mine and refine from the land and environment. The report claims Wyoming “leads the country in coal production with the 10 largest producing coal mines in the United States, providing coal to 35 states and generating nearly 40 percent of the nation’s electricity”. The report also says that the state holds about 70% of the world’s discovered bentonite supply. In addition, Wyoming also has multiple wind farm applications and 34 turbines operating on the Foote Creek Rim wind farm on BLM administered land. Even with all wind turbines, farms, and plants considered, Wyoming has only capitalized on one percent of the possible wind energy. One other resource being capitalized, Wyoming mines uranium and is accountable for nearly 31% of national production. The Nuclear Regulatory Commission is reviewing four uranium plans of operation, each of which are situated at the Casper Field Office, the Rawlins Field Office, the Lander Field Office, and the Buffalo Field Office.

=== Wild Horse Herds ===
The Bureau of Land Management reports that the Wild Free-Roaming Horse and Burros Act of 1971 governs and protects the free ranging and unbranded horses roaming on BLM land of the western United States. They allow the animals to be adopted when population levels overflow the manageable level. The BLM Wyoming estimates the wild horse population was just shy of 4000 horses (3,985 claimed) current in 2010. They claim the state population management level is in a range of 2,490 to 3,725 horses, thus they gathered 1,804 horses, removed 1,238, and used fertility control on 224 mares before releasing the mares back into the wild. Within the horses captured from the wild, 134 were adopted in 2010.

=== Habitat Changes ===
In January 2009, the Wyoming Game and Fish Department released their Strategic Habitat Plan, covering many topics on preserving the Wyoming wildlife habitat and providing coexistence with wildlife and civilization. The plan is partly designed to start assessing the necessary steps required to keep up with the natural changes in the climate, environment, and ecosystems. According to the plan, predictions gathered in 2007 by a panel on climate change deem average air temperatures to change in North America by 1-3 °C between the years 2010 and 2039. Correlating with climate change, scientists also predict that new plant and animal congregations and associations will change the environment and the ecosystem . For more natural changes happening readily in the ecosystems and habitat, the plan stresses that insects such as bark beetles and budworms combined with drought are significantly changing the Wyoming landscape.

== Climate statistics for selected cities ==
Climate data for Cheyenne Regional Airport, Wyoming (1991–2020 normals, (Note: Mean monthly maxima and minima (i.e. the expected highest and lowest temperature readings at any point during the year or given month) calculated based on data at said location from 1991 to 2020.) extremes 1872−present (Note: Official records for Cheyenne kept at the City Office from January 1871 to August 1935 and at Cheyenne Regional since September 1935.))
Month	Jan	Feb	Mar	Apr	May	Jun	Jul	Aug	Sep	Oct	Nov	Dec	Year
Record high °F (°C)	70 (21)	71 (22)	83 (28)	84 (29)	91 (33)	100 (38)	100 (38)	98 (37)	97 (36)	85 (29)	75 (24)	70 (21)	100 (38)
Mean maximum °F (°C)	58.4 (14.7)	60.0 (15.6)	68.6 (20.3)	74.8 (23.8)	82.7 (28.2)	90.8 (32.7)	94.4 (34.7)	92.5 (33.6)	88.1 (31.2)	78.5 (25.8)	67.2 (19.6)	58.8 (14.9)	95.2 (35.1)
Mean daily maximum °F (°C)	40.0 (4.4)	40.6 (4.8)	49.1 (9.5)	54.8 (12.7)	64.4 (18.0)	76.7 (24.8)	84.1 (28.9)	82.0 (27.8)	73.3 (22.9)	59.1 (15.1)	47.5 (8.6)	39.3 (4.1)	59.2 (15.1)
Daily mean °F (°C)	29.2 (−1.6)	29.5 (−1.4)	37.1 (2.8)	42.8 (6.0)	52.3 (11.3)	63.1 (17.3)	70.1 (21.2)	68.1 (20.1)	59.6 (15.3)	46.5 (8.1)	36.1 (2.3)	28.7 (−1.8)	46.9 (8.3)
Mean daily minimum °F (°C)	18.4 (−7.6)	18.4 (−7.6)	25.1 (−3.8)	30.8 (−0.7)	40.2 (4.6)	49.4 (9.7)	56.1 (13.4)	54.3 (12.4)	45.8 (7.7)	33.9 (1.1)	24.7 (−4.1)	18.1 (−7.7)	34.6 (1.4)
Mean minimum °F (°C)	−5.8 (−21.0)	−3.8 (−19.9)	6.6 (−14.1)	16.2 (−8.8)	26.6 (−3.0)	38.5 (3.6)	47.1 (8.4)	44.8 (7.1)	31.9 (−0.1)	16.4 (−8.7)	3.2 (−16.0)	−4.7 (−20.4)	−13.0 (−25.0)
Record low °F (°C)	−38 (−39)	−34 (−37)	−21 (−29)	−8 (−22)	8 (−13)	25 (−4)	33 (1)	25 (−4)	8 (−13)	−5 (−21)	−21 (−29)	−28 (−33)	−38 (−39)
Average precipitation inches (mm)	0.35 (8.9)	0.52 (13)	0.96 (24)	1.79 (45)	2.44 (62)	2.16 (55)	2.11 (54)	1.52 (39)	1.47 (37)	1.00 (25)	0.61 (15)	0.48 (12)	15.41 (391)
Average snowfall inches (cm)	6.3 (16)	9.0 (23)	9.7 (25)	11.3 (29)	3.4 (8.6)	0.0 (0.0)	0.0 (0.0)	0.0 (0.0)	1.0 (2.5)	5.9 (15)	7.5 (19)	8.8 (22)	62.9 (160)
Average extreme snow depth inches (cm)	3.8 (9.7)	3.9 (9.9)	3.8 (9.7)	3.4 (8.6)	1.7 (4.3)	0.0 (0.0)	0.0 (0.0)	0.0 (0.0)	0.5 (1.3)	2.8 (7.1)	4.0 (10)	4.4 (11)	8.5 (22)
Average precipitation days (≥ 0.01 in)	5.1	6.9	7.9	10.6	12.9	10.7	10.5	10.3	7.3	7.1	6.2	6.0	101.5
Average snowy days (≥ 0.1 in)	5.9	7.3	6.8	6.8	1.9	0.1	0.0	0.0	0.5	3.2	5.8	6.7	45.0
Average relative humidity (%)	52.5	54.6	56.1	54.3	55.8	53.5	51.3	51.4	51.5	50.0	53.6	54.0	53.2
Average dew point °F (°C)	9.9 (−12.3)	12.7 (−10.7)	17.1 (−8.3)	24.1 (−4.4)	33.3 (0.7)	41.4 (5.2)	46.2 (7.9)	44.4 (6.9)	35.8 (2.1)	25.5 (−3.6)	17.4 (−8.1)	11.1 (−11.6)	26.6 (−3.0)
Mean monthly sunshine hours	190.7	202.6	253.1	271.9	291.9	303.2	317.5	297.4	262.3	237.0	178.8	175.4	2,981.8
Percentage possible sunshine	64	68	68	68	65	67	69	70	70	69	60	61	67
Average ultraviolet index	1.7	2.7	4.5	6.4	8.2	9.7	10.2	8.8	6.5	3.9	2.2	1.4	5.5
Source 1: NOAA (relative humidity, dew points and sun 1961−1990)
Source 2: UV Index Today (1995 to 2022)

== See also ==
- Environmental issues in Wyoming
- List of Superfund sites in Wyoming
