= List of Wyoming locations by per capita income =

Wyoming has the thirty-sixth highest per capita income in the United States of America, at $19,134 (2000). Its personal per capita income is $32,808 (2003).

== Wyoming counties ranked by per capita income ==
Note: Data is from the 2010 United States Census Data and the 2006-2010 American Community Survey 5-Year Estimates.

Rank	County	Per capita income	Median household income	Median family income	Population	Number of households
1	Teton	$42,224	$70,271	$90,596	21,294	8,973
2	Campbell	$31,968	$76,576	$83,965	46,133	17,172
3	Sublette	$31,433	$70,147	$81,389	10,247	3,906
4	Sweetwater	$30,961	$69,828	$79,527	43,806	16,475
5	Washakie	$28,557	$48,379	$61,340	8,533	3,492
6	Weston	$28,463	$53,853	$63,438	7,208	3,021
7	Natrona	$28,235	$50,936	$62,859	75,450	30,616
	Wyoming	$27,860	$53,802	$65,964	563,626	226,879
8	Converse	$27,656	$54,599	$69,057	13,833	5,673
9	Laramie	$27,406	$52,824	$64,589	91,738	37,576
	United States	$27,334	$51,914	$62,982	308,745,538	116,716,292
10	Sheridan	$26,756	$48,141	$61,959	29,116	12,360
11	Johnson	$26,753	$45,638	$58,983	8,569	3,782
12	Park	$26,203	$46,637	$58,297	28,205	11,885
13	Carbon	$26,122	$56,565	$65,171	15,885	6,388
14	Albany	$25,622	$42,890	$70,054	36,299	15,691
15	Hot Springs	$25,269	$42,469	$54,709	4,812	2,185
16	Crook	$24,520	$49,890	$55,765	7,083	2,921
17	Big Horn	$24,486	$48,270	$57,705	11,668	4,561
18	Uinta	$24,460	$58,346	$68,949	21,118	7,668
19	Lincoln	$24,421	$57,794	$65,347	18,106	6,861
20	Platte	$24,185	$42,947	$51,759	8,667	3,838
21	Fremont	$24,173	$46,397	$55,531	40,123	15,455
22	Goshen	$23,753	$42,590	$51,978	13,249	5,311
23	Niobrara	$22,885	$45,813	$57,153	2,484	1,069
