= List of colleges and universities in Wyoming =

This is a list of colleges and universities in Wyoming. In addition to colleges and universities, this list also includes other educational institutions in Wyoming providing higher education, meaning tertiary, quaternary, and, in some cases, post-secondary education.

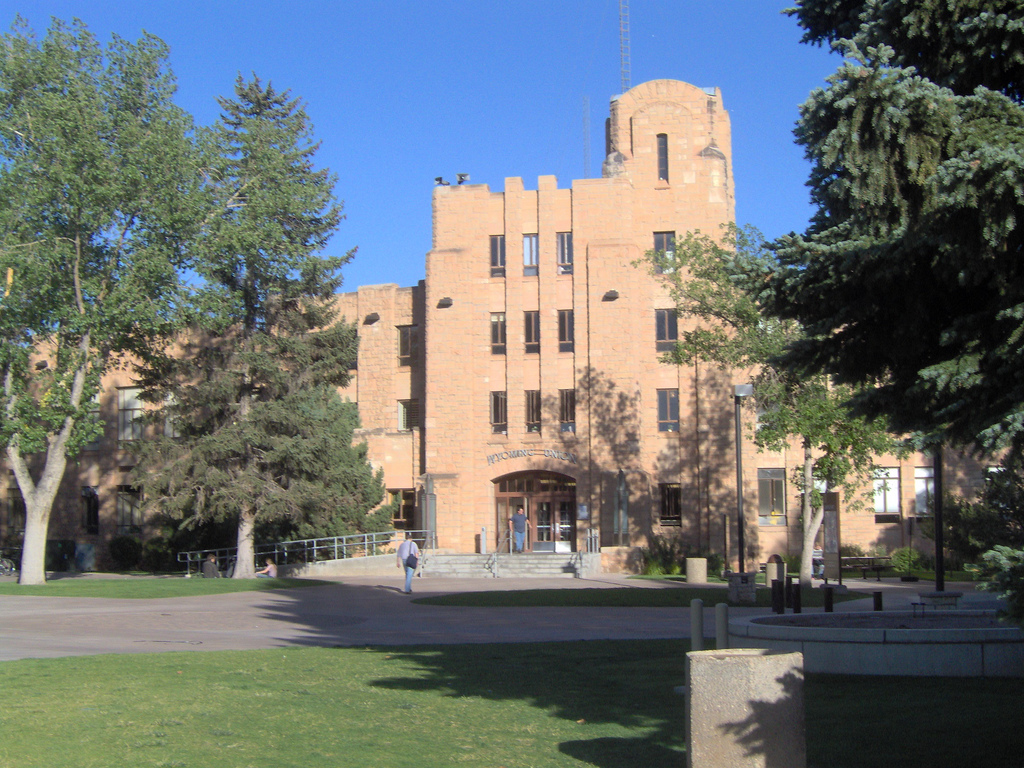
Student Union at the University of Wyoming

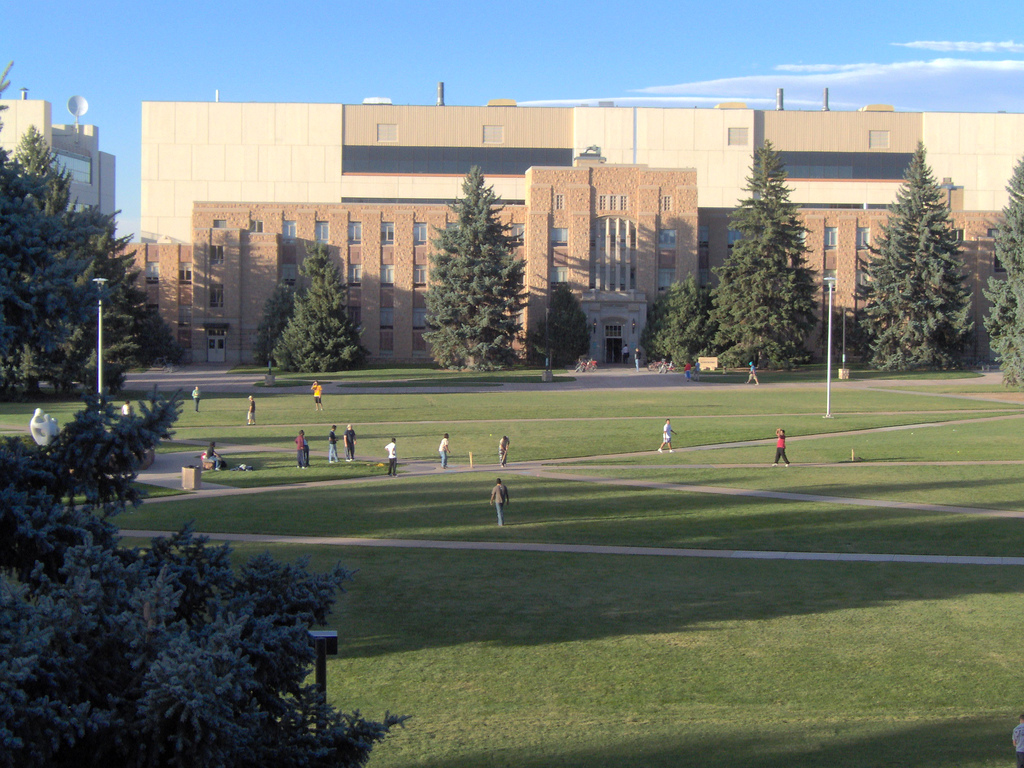
Prexy's Pasture at the University of Wyoming

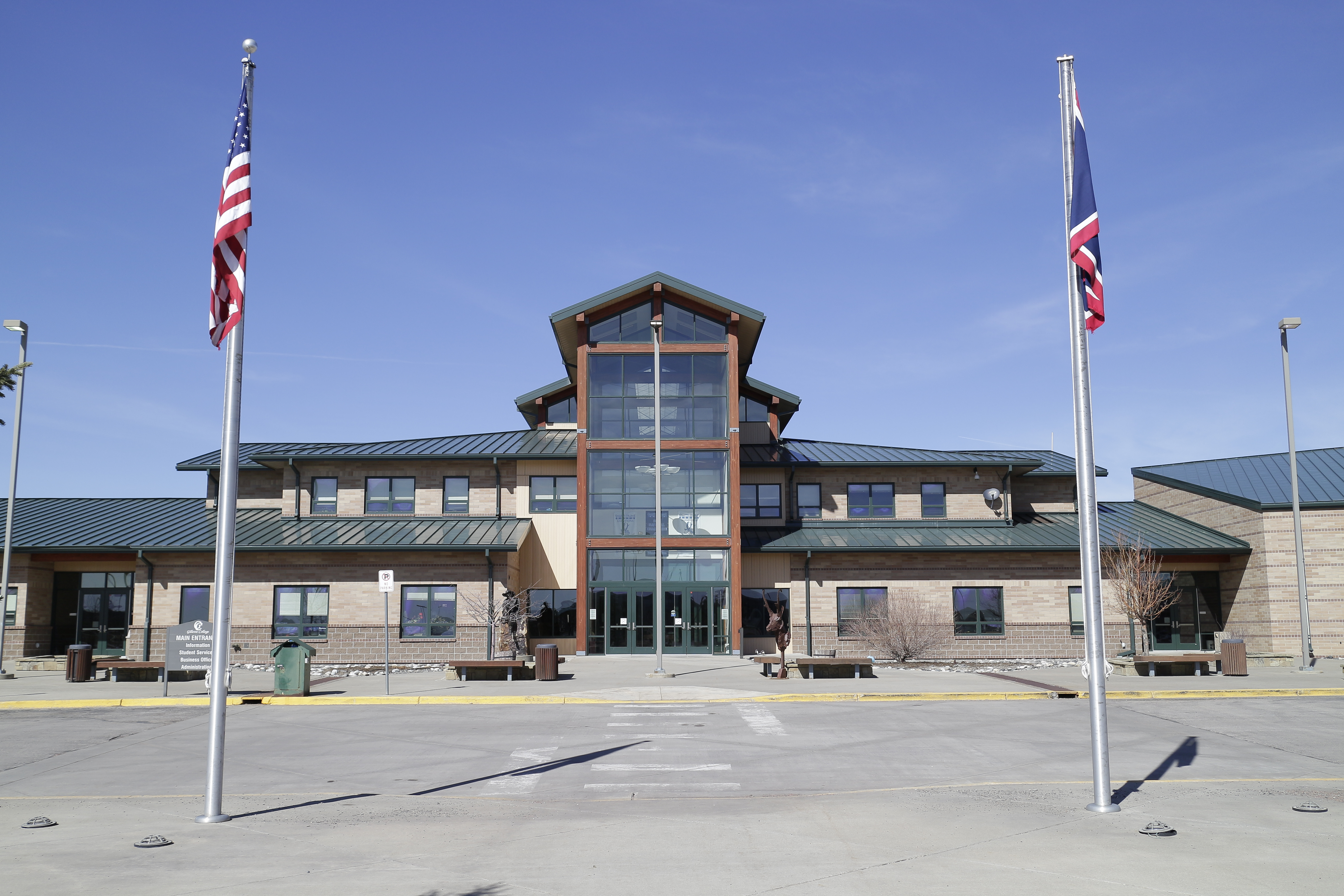
Gillette College

== List ==
Name	Location	Control	Type	Founded	Enrollment (Fall 2024)	Male %/ Female %
Casper College	Casper	Community	Associate's	1944	3,403	44%/56%
Central Wyoming College	Riverton	Community	Associate's	1966	2,205	42%/58%
Eastern Wyoming College	Torrington	Community	Associate's	1948	1,457	40%/60%
Gillette College	Gillette	Community	Associate's	1969		
Laramie County Community College	Cheyenne	Community	Associate's	1968	4,193	36%/64%
Northwest College	Powell	Community	Associate's	1946	1,486	45%/55%
Sheridan College	Sheridan	Community	Associate's	1948	3,534	44%/56%
Western Wyoming Community College	Rock Springs	Community	Associate's	1959	2,653	40%/60%
University of Wyoming	Laramie	Public	Doctoral	1886	10,813	46%/54%
Wyoming Catholic College	Lander	Private	Baccalaureate	2005		
Wyoming Technical Institute (WyoTech)	Laramie	For-profit	Associate's	1966	1,335	92%/8%
Wind River Tribal College	Fort Washakie	Tribal	Associate's	1997		

== See also ==
- Higher education in the United States
- List of college athletic programs in Wyoming
- List of American institutions of higher education
- List of recognized higher education accreditation organizations
- List of colleges and universities
- List of colleges and universities by country
