= Solar power in Wyoming =

Wyoming Solar Power

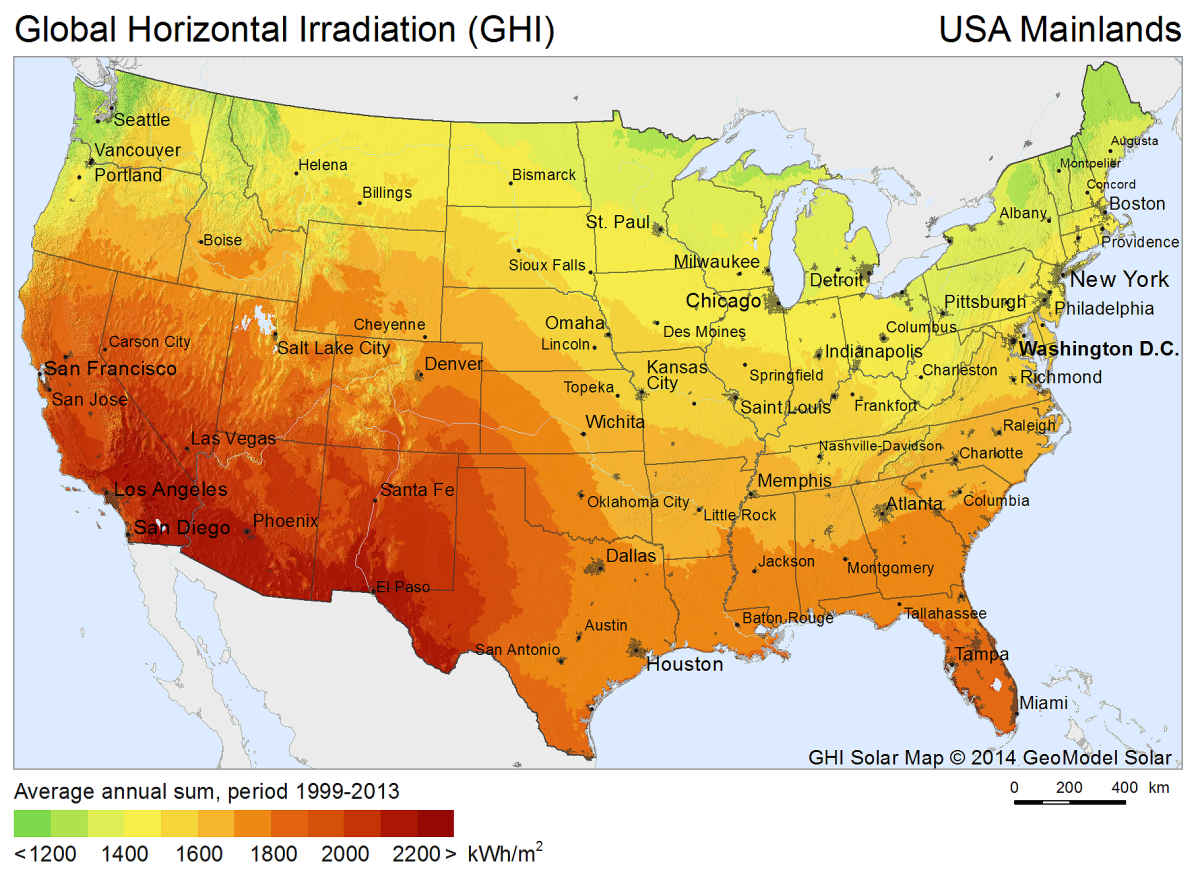
U.S. solar potential

Solar power in Wyoming has the potential to generate 72 million MWh/yr. Wyoming used 12 million MWh in 1999. Net metering is available to all consumers generating up to 25 kW. The state has an installed capacity of 146 MW as of 2022.

== Facilities ==
The dormitories near Old Faithful Geyser installed 30.78 kW of solar panels in 2015.

The 92MW Sweetwater Solar project near Green River came online as the first utility-scale solar farm in Wyoming in December 2018. Additional projects are in advanced stages of development to be located near Kemmerer as the region's economy transitions from a scheduled closure of the Naugton coal plant.

The largest solar farm is the South Cheyenne Solar Facility in Laramie County at 150 MW. Developers have proposed a 771 MW project near Cheyenne.

== Statistics ==
Source: NREL

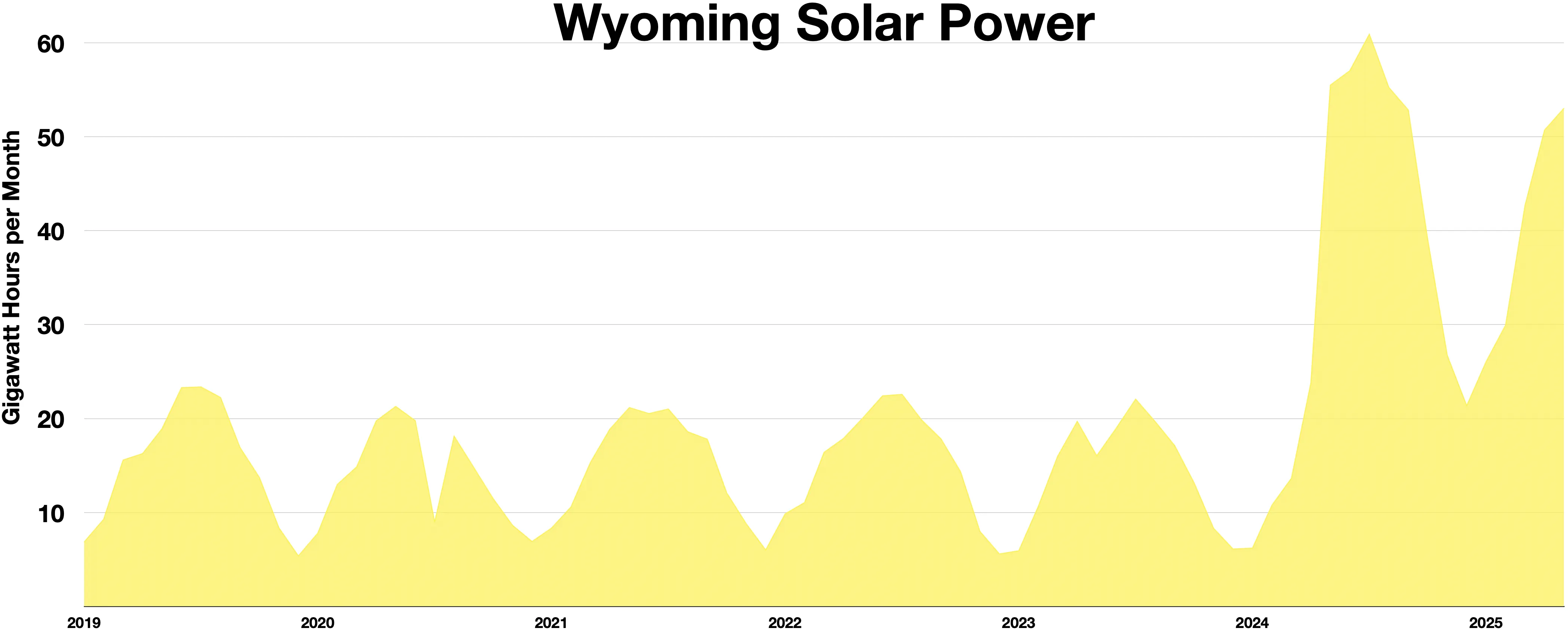
Wyoming solar power

Wyoming grid-connected PV capacity (MW)
Year	Capacity	Change	% change
2009	0.1		
2010	0.2	0.1	100%
2011	0.2	<0.1	0%
2012	0.6	0.4	200%
2013	1.0	0.4	66%
2014	1.2	0.2	20%
2015	1.5	0.3	25%
2016	1.9	0.4	26%
2017	2.3	0.4	21%
2018	112.3	110	4,782%
2019	117.6	5.3	4%
2020	140	22.4	19%
2021	141.9	1.9	%
2022	146	4.1	%

Utility-scale solar generation in Wyoming (GWh)
Year	Total	Jan	Feb	Mar	Apr	May	Jun	Jul	Aug	Sep	Oct	Nov	Dec
2018	1	0	0	0	0	0	0	0	0	0	0	0	1
2019	179	7	9	16	16	19	23	23	22	17	14	8	5
2020	166	8	13	15	20	21	20	9	18	15	11	9	7
2021	135	8	11	15	19	21	21	21	19				

== See also ==
- Wind power in Wyoming
- Solar power in the United States
- Renewable energy in the United States
