= Wyoming (song) =

Song
- Released: 1903

A Piano arrangement of Wyoming by Jack Ryan Morris

"Wyoming" is the state song of Wyoming. Judge Charles Edwin Winter (1870–1948) wrote the words during the summer of 1903, and Earle R. Clemens (1878–1943) wrote music to it soon thereafter. They copyrighted the song in 1913 and the Wyoming Publishing Company in Casper published it that same year and the song became the unofficial Wyoming state song. Clemens was a newspaper editor for the Grand Encampment Herald, the newspaper of Grand Encampment, Wyoming.

In 1920, George Edwin Knapp (1886–1967) composed a new melody for Judge Winter's poem. He copyrighted and published it through Richter Music Company of Casper. The song was adopted as the official state song on February 15, 1955. Knapp — a baritone singer and choral conductor — was professor of voice and director of the music department University of Wyoming from 1920 to 1930.

== History ==
Governor Fenimore Chatterton has been credited as the first to announce "Wyoming" as the official state song, during a 1903 convention in Sheridan of the State Industrial Association. The song was later endorsed as the official song by the state press association, state industrial convention, and the state university, then Wyoming State University.

== Extant published versions ==
- "Wyoming", lyrics by Winter, music by Knapp, Casper: Bailey School Supply (1925); OCLC 21145585
- "Wyoming" ("In the Far and Mighty West"), march song, lyrics by Winter, music by Knapp, Casper: Richter Music (1920); OCLC 21111316

== Lyrics ==
In the far and mighty West,
Where the crimson sun seeks rest,
There's a growing splendid state that lies above,
On the breast of this great land;
Where the massive Rockies stand,
There's Wyoming young and strong, the State I love!

In the flowers wild and sweet,
Colors rare and perfumes meet;
There's the columbine so pure, the daisy too,
Wild the rose and red it springs,
White the button and its rings,
Thou art loyal for they're red and white and blue.

Where thy peaks with crowned head,
Rising until the sky they wed,
Sit like snow queens ruling wood and stream and plain;
'Neath thy granite bases deep,
'Neath thy bosom's broadened sweep,
Lie the riches that have gained and brought thee fame.

Other treasures thou dost hold,
Men and women thou dost mould;
True and earnest are the lives that thou dost raise,
Strength thy children thou dost teach,
Nature's truth thou givest to each,
Free and noble are thy workings and thy ways.

In the nation's banner free
There's one star that has for me
A radiance pure and a splendor like the sun;
Mine it is, Wyoming's star
Home it leads me near or far;
O Wyoming! All my heart and love you've won!

Chorus
Wyoming, Wyoming! Land of the sunlight clear!
Wyoming, Wyoming! Land that we hold so dear!
Wyoming, Wyoming! Precious art thou and thine!
Wyoming, Wyoming! Beloved state of mine.
