= Wind power in Wyoming =

Electricity from wind in U.S. state

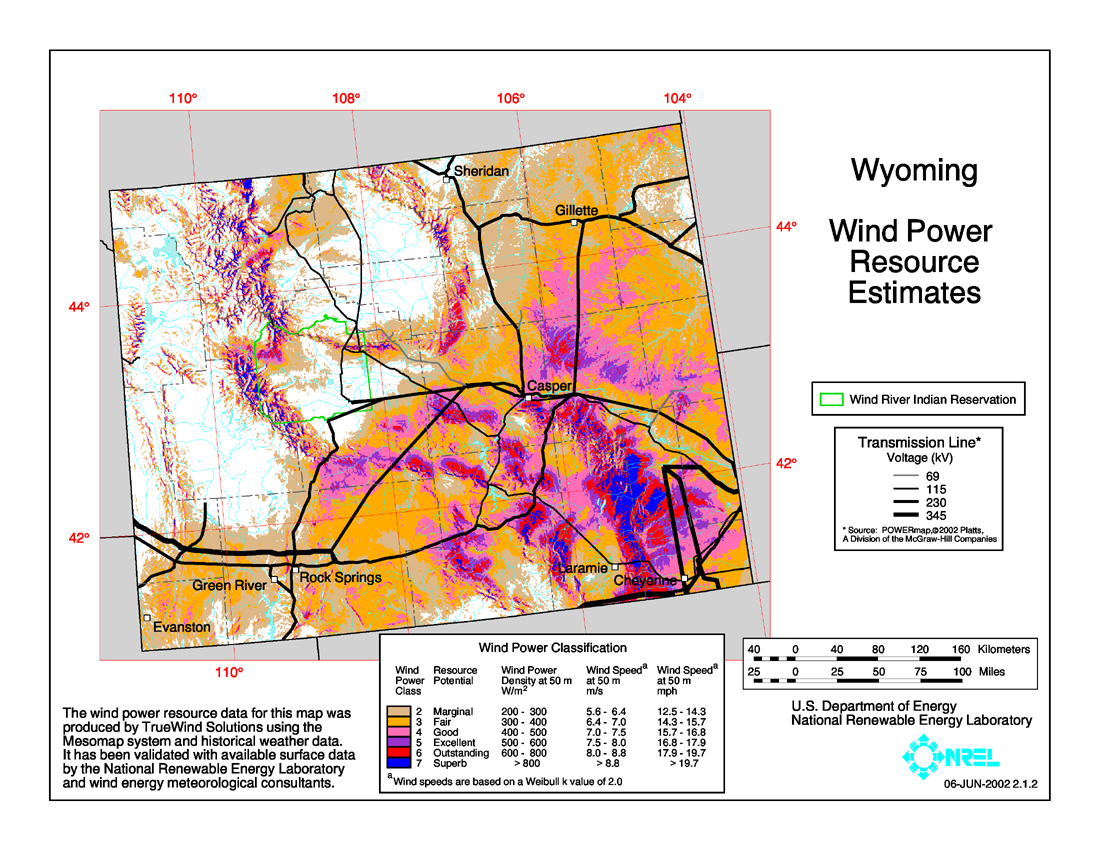
Wind resource map at 50m above ground

Wyoming has one of the highest wind power potentials of any state in the United States. In 2019, Wyoming had wind powered electricity generating capacity of 1,589 MW, which produced 9.85% of its electric generation, with an additional 3,753 MW under construction. However, the wind generation in that year was Wyoming's third-lowest in the 2010s. By 2020, wind capacity increased to 2738 MW, and 8448 gigawatt-hours of electricity were produced from wind in 2021, more than double 2019 production. Additional wind capacity and needed transmission lines are under construction or planned, despite political headwinds from Wyoming's strong coal and oil sectors.

== Resource ==
Wyoming's geography of high-altitude prairies with broad ridges makes it an ideal site for the development of wind resources. Other factors that positively affect the state's wind power development potential include transmission capabilities, the high energy needs of nearby population centers, high public support of wind power development in the state (97% support), and the historical importance of energy sectors to the state's economy.

Disadvantages to large-scale wind power production include competition from fossil fuels industry, as coal power provided 42.7 TWh (90%) of Wyoming electricity in 2016, compared to 3.8 TWh for wind. Wyoming taxes wind power at $1/MWh, which provided the state with $3.8 million in 2015.

The Big Hollow is a wind eroded deflation basin located to the west of Laramie, Wyoming in the United States. It is the second largest wind eroded depression in the world, and the largest deflation basin in North America.

== History ==
At the end of 2013, Wyoming had the highest per capita wind power capacity.

The first two wind turbines in Wyoming were constructed in Medicine Bow on September 4, 1982, by NASA and the United States Department of Energy. The turbines were the largest in the U.S. The two turbines included the WTS-4 at 391 feet tall, and the MOD-2 at 350 feet tall. Mayor of Medicine Bow Gerald Cook held an event with 500 residents at the construction site and declared September 4 "Wind Turbine Day."

Wyoming's first commercial wind farm was the Foote Creek Rim wind project located near Arlington, completed on April 4, 1999. This 85 MW wind project had 69 wind turbines, and it is located in one of the windiest locations in the state. Due to average winds of 25 mph in the area, the wind project has a capacity factor of 43% of peak output annually, which is higher than most wind farms. As of 2016, the Foote Creek wind project had 183 turbines with a generating capacity of 134.7 MW.

In 2003, the Wyoming Wind Energy Center began operations. It has 80 turbines with a 144 MW capacity, and is located near Evanston in Uinta County.

In 2008, the Glenrock Wind Project outside of Glenrock began operations on top of a reclaimed surface coal mine. PacifiCorp, the owner, "believe[s] this is the first wind facility in the West to recycle land that once provided fossil fuels into one that captures renewable energy." The wind project has 66 turbines that generate up to 99 MW, later up to 158 MW.

Seven Mile Hill and Seven Mile Hill II began operations between Hanna and Medicine Bow. They have 79 turbines with a generating capacity of 118.5 MW. In 2008, Mountain Wind Power, LLC and Mountain Wind Power II, LLC began operations. They have 67 turbines with a 140 MW capacity.

As of 2016, Wyoming had 1,489 MW of wind powered electricity generating capacity, responsible for 9.42% of in-state electricity production. Wyoming produced of 3,800 GWh in 2015, about 9% of the total.

Wyoming wind generation by year	Wyoming wind generation capacity by year
Wind generation since 2001 (gigawatt-hours)	Wind generation capacity since 2001 (installed megawatts)

In November 2008, The New York Times reported a land rush in Wyoming in anticipation of future wind power development projects. Citizens and land-owners in Wyoming have formed numerous "wind associations" in the hopes of collectively bargaining for higher compensation for the use of their land in wind power production and transmission projects. Most of these associations are located in the wind-power dense counties of southeastern Wyoming, including Platte, Converse, Goshen and Laramie counties.

In 2010, the High Plains and McFadden Ridge Wind Energy Project near Rock River began operations with 66 turbines. It has a capacity of 99 MW. Three Buttes Windpower, LLC, began operations in Converse County near Glenrock and has 66 turbines with a 99 MW capacity. Casper Wind Farm began operations near Casper in Natrona County and has 11 turbines with a generating capacity of 16.5 MW.

Energy Transportation Inc., headquartered in Casper, is a well-known logistics firm that transports overweight and outsized components used in the wind power industry. The Casper landfill is also a disposal site for windmill blades.

In 2010, Dunalap I began operations near Medicine Bow. It has 74 turbines with 111 MW capacity. The Top of the World Windpower Project began operations in Converse County near Glenrock, and has 110 turbines with a 200 MW capacity.

On November 16, 2016, Microsoft Corp bought 237 MW of wind power from Duke Energy's Happy Jack and Silver Sage wind farms in Wyoming along with Allianz Risk Transfer AG's Bloom Wind Project in Kansas to power a data center located in Cheyenne. This was the largest wind purchase in the history of Microsoft. Between 2011 and 2017, no wind farms were built in Wyoming.

The Chokecherry and Sierra Madre Wind Energy Project is the largest commercial wind generation facility under development in North America. Power Company of Wyoming has applied to the BLM to build approximately 1,000 wind turbines in an area located south of Rawlins, Wyoming, in Carbon County. The project is proposed to generate 2,000 to 3,000 megawatts (MW) of electricity, and construction may take 3–4 years, with a project life estimate of 30 years.

== Wind energy generation ==
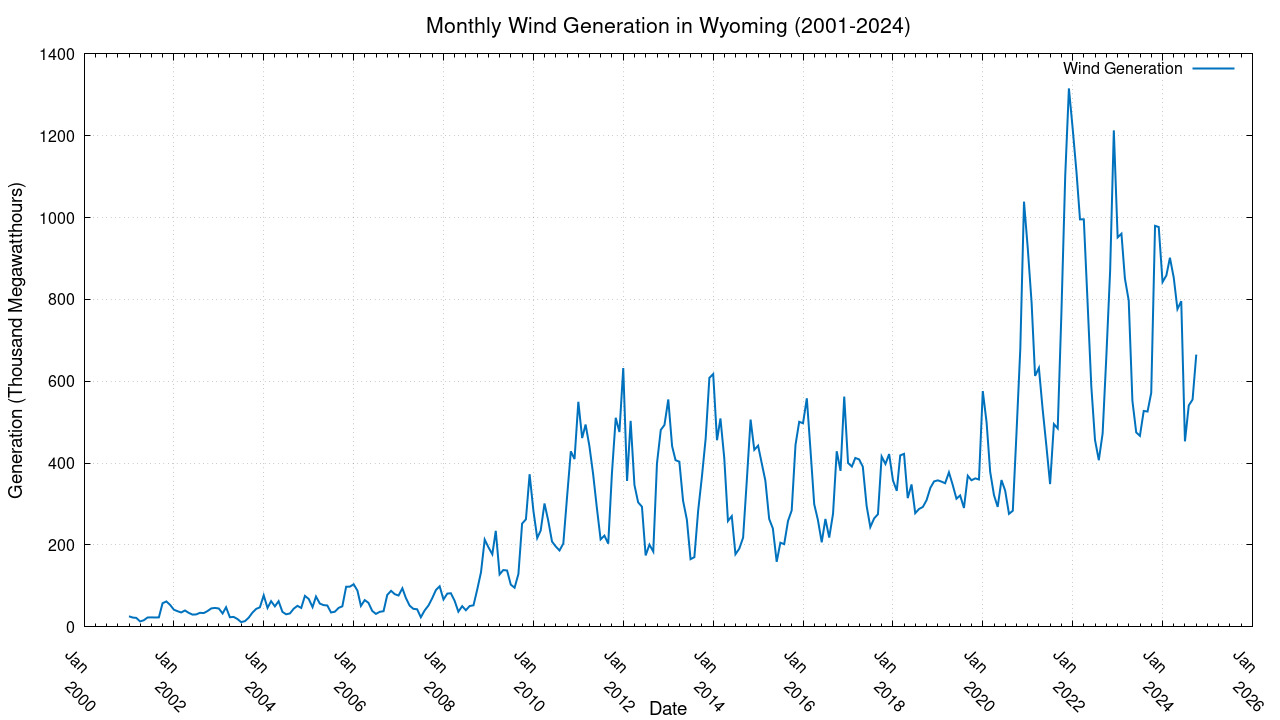
Monthly wind energy generation in Wyoming from 2001 to 2024, measured in thousand megawatt-hours

Wyoming wind generation monthly average (2001–2024)

Net generation for wind monthly (thousand megawatthours)
Year	Jan	Feb	Mar	Apr	May	Jun	Jul	Aug	Sep	Oct	Nov	Dec	Total
2001	25.784	22.671	21.956	13.247	16.013	22.828	23.136	22.838	23.136	57.769	62.057	53.724	365.009
2002	41.829	38.066	35.100	39.981	34.283	29.934	30.322	34.270	33.710	38.522	45.067	46.247	447.351
2003	44.855	32.632	47.914	23.440	24.315	19.253	11.672	13.782	22.393	34.624	43.916	47.683	366.479
2004	77.118	46.169	62.807	50.060	62.690	36.625	30.695	32.739	44.406	51.313	46.219	75.674	616.515
2005	68.085	48.180	74.094	56.886	53.132	52.212	35.103	36.940	46.362	50.111	98.032	98.129	717.266
2006	104.063	88.413	51.098	65.377	58.789	38.897	31.665	36.661	38.238	78.001	88.015	79.845	759.061
2007	76.569	94.247	70.813	51.770	44.046	42.929	23.382	40.055	52.162	69.628	90.194	99.086	754.981
2008	66.800	81.232	82.108	63.375	36.974	50.500	40.536	50.882	52.599	90.813	133.471	213.252	962.541
2009	194.059	177.284	234.608	128.126	138.771	137.646	103.198	95.559	129.162	252.278	262.666	372.847	2226.204
2010	283.229	217.034	235.208	301.414	260.064	208.498	196.472	186.585	203.626	315.960	428.802	409.901	3247.792
2011	549.885	461.290	494.330	441.525	373.562	289.523	213.625	222.934	203.309	375.097	510.798	475.988	4611.866
2012	632.265	356.512	503.267	346.555	304.274	293.559	174.419	200.810	184.006	399.066	481.052	493.321	4768.106
2013	555.595	441.555	407.225	403.540	308.350	261.835	165.344	170.238	284.531	366.110	460.648	608.312	4433.283
2014	617.675	455.949	509.132	412.031	258.495	270.506	177.399	191.013	217.869	356.796	506.418	432.474	4405.757
2015	442.749	397.522	357.181	263.694	240.391	158.878	205.549	202.021	258.565	284.487	444.702	500.970	4196.208
2016	497.419	558.400	435.234	299.626	261.165	206.552	263.607	218.109	276.358	429.063	381.175	562.630	4889.338
2017	400.354	391.616	412.626	409.090	391.397	295.420	243.760	264.945	275.166	416.124	397.966	422.192	4321.656
2018	357.914	332.286	418.895	422.695	314.457	347.952	277.682	287.966	292.954	309.383	339.610	355.364	4057.158
2019	357.900	354.641	350.889	377.411	347.378	313.021	321.069	290.421	369.181	358.148	362.732	360.028	4263.820
2020	576.068	499.309	378.914	321.803	293.096	358.655	332.671	276.113	283.637	473.860	679.634	1038.876	5512.636
2021	923.099	790.771	613.125	632.710	533.289	441.728	348.789	495.337	484.829	766.906	1101.722	1315.555	8448.860
2022	1215.994	1109.383	995.561	995.661	797.271	587.562	456.705	407.139	472.618	659.651	869.536	1213.061	9779.141
2023	951.534	960.570	851.223	797.401	552.169	475.046	466.690	527.435	526.041	571.845	979.781	976.861	8636.616
2024	842.326	858.602	901.797	853.084	776.319	795.773	453.209	540.972	555.293	665.177			7242.552

== See also ==
- Solar power in Wyoming
- Wind power in the United States
- Renewable energy in the United States
