= Wyoming Cowboys soccer =

The Wyoming Cowboys soccer team was a former NCAA Division I men's college soccer team that represented the University of Wyoming.
