= List of Superfund sites in Wyoming =

This is a list of Superfund sites in Wyoming designated under the Comprehensive Environmental Response, Compensation, and Liability Act (CERCLA) environmental law. The CERCLA federal law of 1980 authorized the United States Environmental Protection Agency (EPA) to create a list of polluted locations requiring a long-term response to clean up hazardous material contaminations. These locations are known as Superfund sites, and are placed on the National Priorities List (NPL).

The NPL guides the EPA in "determining which sites warrant further investigation" for environmental remediation. As of March 26, 2010, there were two Superfund sites on the National Priorities List in Wyoming. No other sites are currently proposed for entry on the list, and one site has been cleaned up and removed from the NPL.

== Superfund sites ==
Deleted from National Priorities List

CERCLIS ID	Name	County	Reason	Proposed	Listed	Construction completed	Partially deleted	Deleted
WYD061112470	Baxter/Union Pacific Tie Treating	Albany	Pentachlorophenol, benzene, naphthalene, toluene, and phenol contaminated the shallow ground water beneath the site and the Laramie River.	12/30/1982	09/08/1983	07/26/2002	–	12/06/1999
WY5571924179	F. E. Warren Air Force Base	Laramie	Gasoline, solvents, oil, lubricating oils, hydraulic fluid, ethylene glycol, batteries, battery acid, coal ash, fly ash, paint, and trichloroethylene were formerly disposed of on the base. TCE and chloroform (a degradation product of carbon tetrachloride) are present in monitoring wells on the base.	07/14/1989	02/21/1990	–	–	–
WYD981546005	Mystery Bridge Rd/U.S. Highway 20	Natrona	An unlined waste pit on the site contained volatile halogenated organic compounds, xylenes, ethylbenzene, toluene, naphthalene, chrysene, methylnaphthalene, and benzene. Chlorinated organic solvents, including trichloroethylene, tetrachloroethylene, 1,1,1-trichloroethane, and 1,2-dichloroethylene were found in private wells 0.5 mile away.	06/24/1988	08/30/1990	12/16/1993	–	–

== See also ==
- List of Superfund sites in the United States
- List of environmental issues
- List of waste types
- TOXMAP
