= Music of Wyoming =

The music of Wyoming includes a number of well-regarded music festivals, as well as a heritage that includes Native American, European, and American music.

== Music history ==
The first music in Wyoming was played by various Native American tribes in the present-day U.S. state of Wyoming. European settlers later arrived, bringing with them harmonicas, flutes, fiddles, and guitars because these were relatively lightweight and easy to carry on the frontier. The military played a major role in the historical development of the music of Wyoming. Virtually all posts had a band, and many soldiers learned to play the bugle and served in the drum and bugle corps. Military music was often the most prominent source of entertainment in many parts of early colonial Wyoming.

Outsider musician Moondog lived in Wyoming as a child.

Pop punk band The Lillingtons were formed in Newcastle in 1995.

Rapper Kanye West's 2018 album Ye was recorded on his ranch in Jackson Hole, Wyoming and has a picture of the Teton Range on the cover.

== Notable Wyoming musicians ==
- Spencer Bohren – critically acclaimed American Folk and Blues artist.
- Chris Ledoux – (d. 2005 in Casper) country music singer-songwriter, bronze sculptor, and rodeo champion. He attended Casper College. He performed at the Cheyenne Frontier Days Arena in '97 and '99.
- Todd Sampson – Singer and songwriter behind 'Mountain Apple Epidemic'
- Chancey Williams – country music singer-songwriter and former saddle bronc rider.

== Music institutions ==
Music institutions in Wyoming include the Wyoming Symphony Orchestra and the Cheyenne Symphony Orchestra.

== Music festivals ==
Music festivals in Wyoming include the Cheyenne Frontier Days celebration, which dates back to 1896 and draws 300,000 people to Cheyenne at the end of July. The festival features various crafts, dances and food, as well as major country concerts every night. The Cheyenne Frontier Days Arena has hosted concerts since Johnny Cash in '77. Shoshoni is home to the Oldtime Fiddlers' Contest, while nearby Riverton hosts the Cowboy Poetry Round-up every October. The town of Cody is well known for the Buffalo Bill Historical Center, which features various music events throughout the year, while Jackson also hosts many music events during the year, especially Old West Days and the Cowboy Ski Challenge. The nearby Grand Targhee Resort in Alta is home to the annual Targhee Fest in mid-July, and their famous Bluegrass Music Festival in August. Jackson Hole is also home to the Grand Teton Music Festival, one of the largest festivals in the state. Laramie hosts the Wyoming International Chamber Music Festival each summer.
