= Flag of Wyoming =

U.S. state flag

Wyoming
- Use: Civil and state flag
- Proportion: 7:10
- Adopted: January 31, 1917; 109 years ago
- Design: A dark blue field bordered by white and red; in the centre is the white silhouette of a bison bearing the state seal.
- Designed by: Verna Keays

The flag of the U.S. state of Wyoming was adopted on January 31, 1917. Its design consists of a blue field bordered by white and red, with a white silhouette of an American bison in the center, bearing the state seal rendered in blue on its side.

== Statute ==
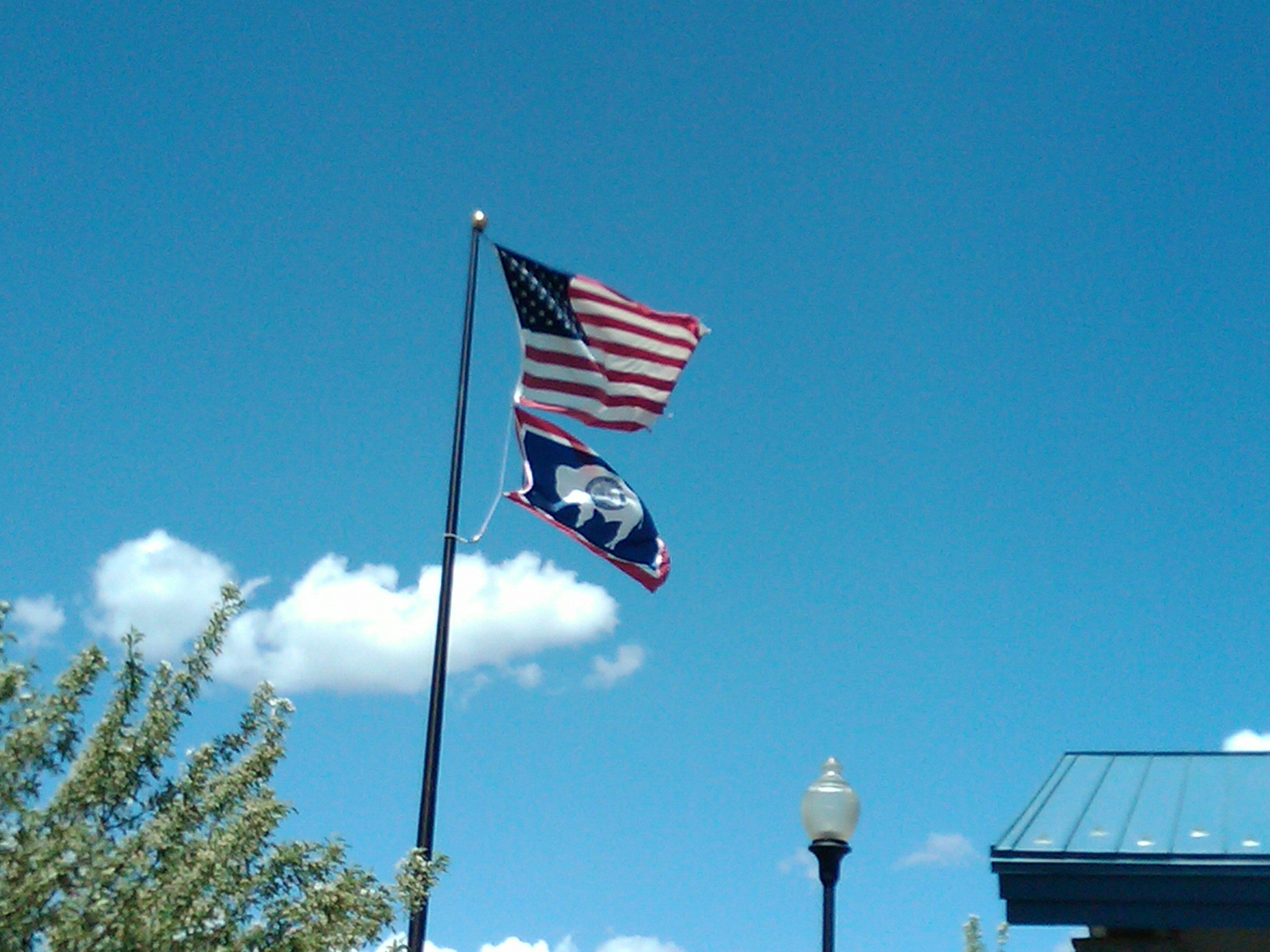
Flag of Wyoming flying below the United States flag.

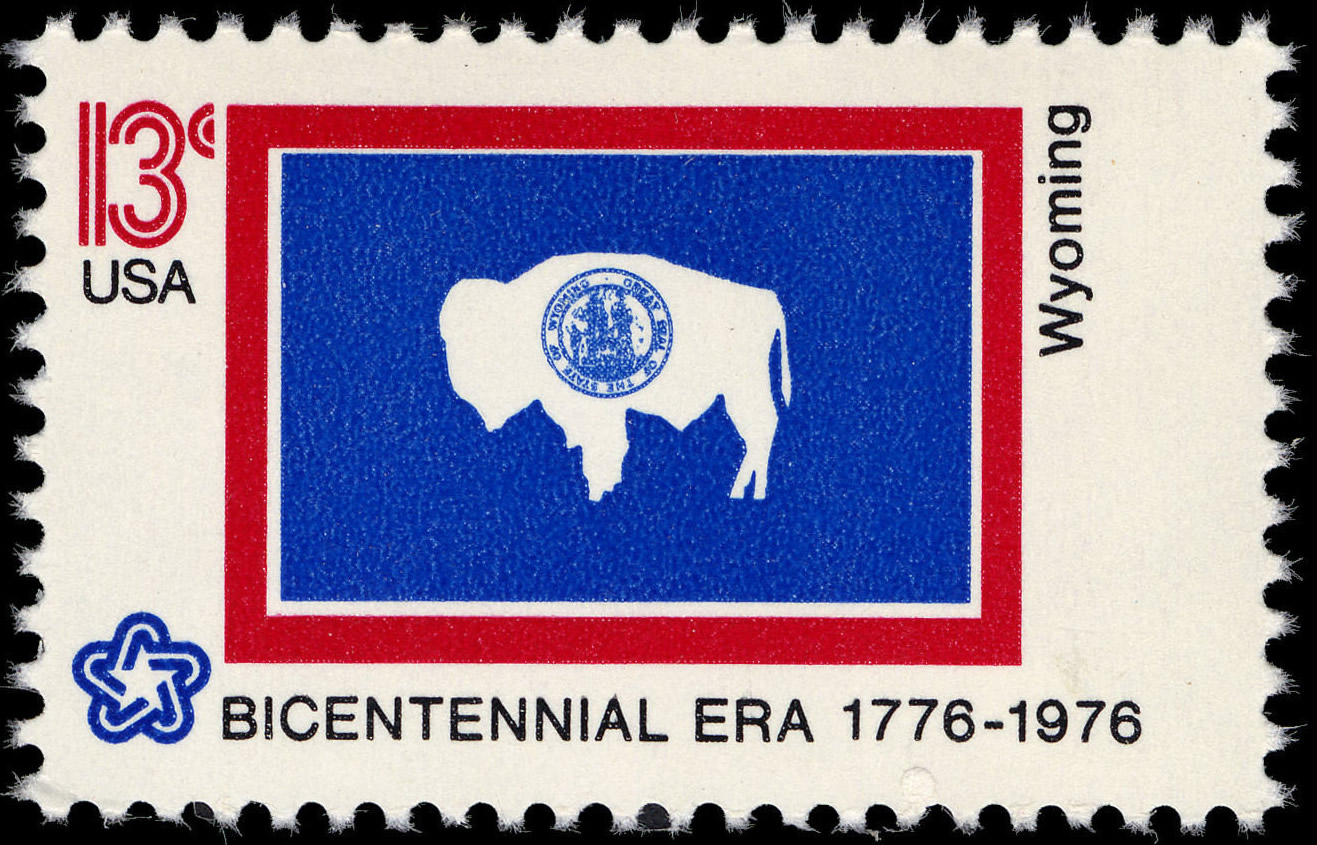
The Wyoming state flag as depicted in the 1976 bicentennial postage stamp series.

The 2024 Wyoming Statutes, Title 8, Chapter 3, § 8-3-102 defines the state flag as follows:

The width of the flag shall be seven-tenths (7/10) of its length; the outside border shall be in red, the width of which shall be one-twentieth (1/20) of the length of the flag; next to the border shall be a stripe of white on the four (4) sides of the field, which shall be in width one-fortieth (1/40) of the length of the flag. The remainder of the flag shall be a blue field, in the center of which shall be a white silhouetted buffalo, the length of which shall be one-half (1/2) of the length of the blue field; the other measurements of the buffalo shall be in proportion to its length. On the ribs of the buffalo shall be the great seal of the state of Wyoming in blue. The seal shall be in diameter one-fifth (1/5) the length of the flag. Attached to the flag shall be a cord of gold with gold tassels. The same colors shall be used in the flag, red, white and blue, as are used in the flag of the United States of America.

=== Design of the seal ===
The great seal of Wyoming, as defined in the 2024 Wyoming Statutes, Title 8, Chapter 3, § 8-3-101, is as follows:

- Circular seal with the outer rim inscribed "Great Seal of the State of Wyoming"
- Central pedestal with an eagle resting on a shield, the shield bearing a star and the number "44"
- Draped female figure modeled on the Louvre's "Victory," standing on the pedestal and holding a staff with a banner reading "Equal Rights," with broken chains hanging from her wrists
- Male figures flanking the pedestal representing the livestock and mining industries
- Two pillars in the background, each supporting a lighted lamp
- Scrolls around the pillars inscribed "Livestock" and "Grain" (right) and "Mines" and "Oil" (left)
- Dates "1869–1890" at the base of the pedestal

== Symbolism ==
The symbolism of the Wyoming state seal as detailed in the statute reflects both the state's history and values: the eagle and shield represent the United States and Wyoming's position as the 44th state; the central female figure embodies the political position and rights of women, with broken chains signifying freedom and progress; the male figures symbolize the key industries of livestock and mining; the two pillars and lamps signify the light of knowledge; the scrolls identify the primary economic sectors; and the dates "1869–1890" mark the organization of the Wyoming Territory and the state's admission to the Union.

In 1919, the Wyoming state legislature appropriated funds to print and distribute pamphlets for schoolchildren, containing color-embossed copies of the state flag along with explanatory remarks about its design. The pamphlet explained that the seal on the bison represents the western custom of branding, and that the bison itself was once "monarch of the plains." The red border symbolizes both the Native Americans, who "knew and loved our country long before any of us were here," and the blood of pioneers who gave their lives reclaiming the land. White signifies purity and uprightness, while blue, reminiscent of Wyoming's skies and distant mountains, represents fidelity, justice, and virility. Finally, the pamphlet notes that the red, white, and blue of Wyoming's flag correspond to the colors of the Stars and Stripes of the United States, the "greatest flag in all the world."

== History ==
=== Pre-official flags (before 1917) ===
"Wyoming" flag displayed at the National Woman Suffrage Convention in Washington, D.C., 1891, per description

One of the earliest documented flags representing Wyoming appeared at the National Woman Suffrage Convention in Washington, D.C., in February 1891. The flag was a modified United States flag where the canton featured a single white star and the word "Wyoming," symbolizing the newly admitted state, acknowledged at the event as the only state to grant women full voting rights. A contemporary account described it as "the emblem of the new state of Wyoming." Two years later it was referred to as the Suffragists's flag, with the note that two smaller stars were to be added in honor of the municipal suffrage givenn to women in Kansas and Michigan.

Several sources refer to a state flag, but do not describe its design. According to The Wyoming Commonwealth, in July of 1890 an Admission day paraded in Cheyenne, a lady named Mrs. Fannie Oilerenshaw carried with her what was described as a state flag. The design is not known. Another mention of a state flag was in 1910. It was being sent to the Virginia Fair by Adjutant General P. A. Gatchell. The flag was not described.

Rep. Frederick's 1911 proposal, per description

In February 1911, a bill was introduced by Representative Pep Frederick to the house to propose a state flag. The bill didn't pass the house with the state not having an official flag for another 6 years. The flag was described as:

...three alternate stripes of pale blue and white bunting, silk, or other appropriate material; said stripes to be equal width and parallel with the staff, the white stripe being the middle one and to have in its longitudinal center a correct outline or color reproduction of the STATE SEAL whose diameter shall be five-sixth's... of the width of the white stripe; the proportion of the flag being a width of two-thirds... its length.

=== Current flag (1917–present) ===
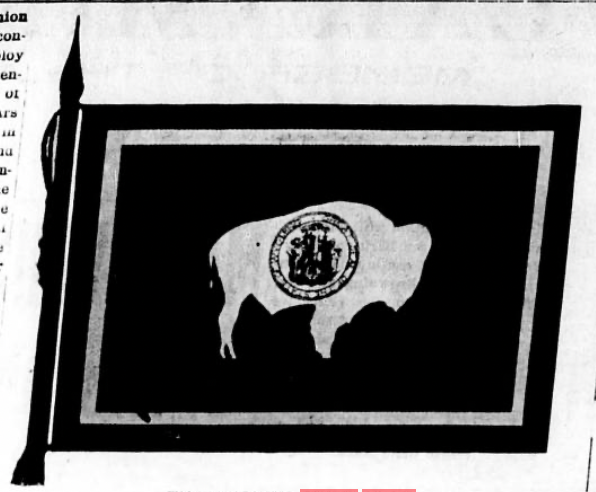
Verna Keays' original design

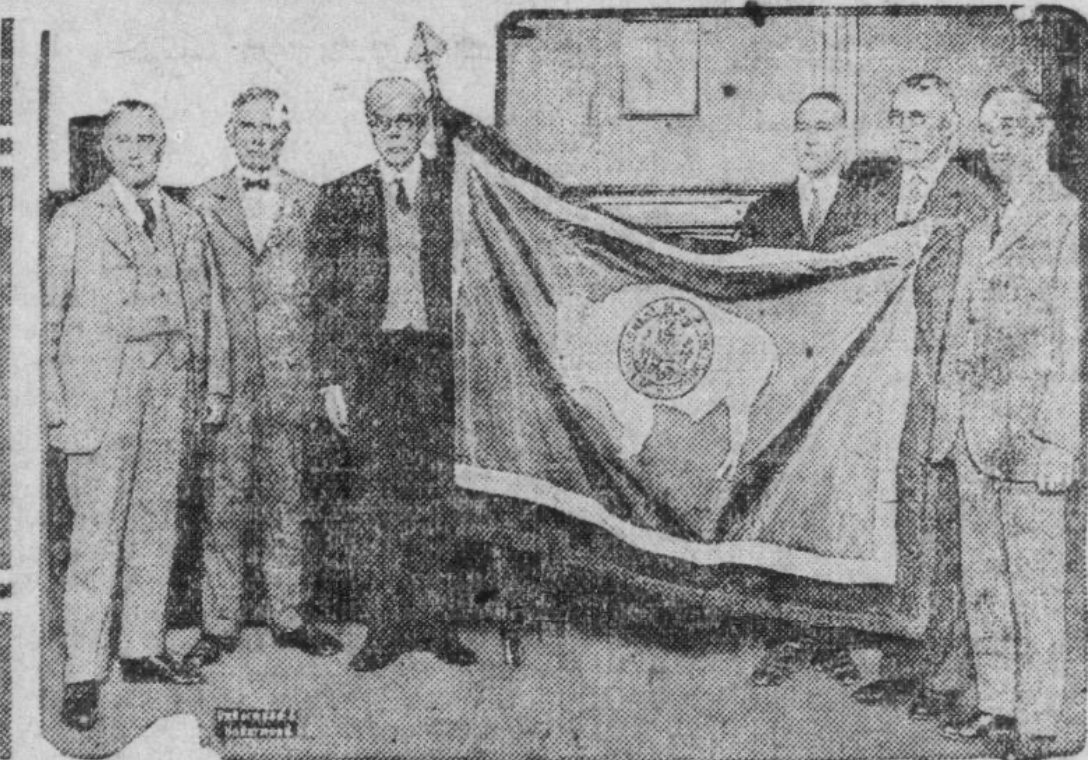
The Wyoming state flag presented to the Post Office Department by a delegation from Wyoming, 1926

In 1916, the Wyoming Daughters of the American Revolution (DAR) hosted a public contest to design a state flag. The contest, advertised in Wyoming newspapers beginning in early September 1916, offered a $20 prize (equivalent to $592 in 2025) and gave designers approximately one month to submit entries, all of which were to be postmarked to the address of DAR state regent Grace Raymond Hebard. A total of 37 submissions were received, and the winning design was selected by DAR members. The chosen entry was created by Verna Keays, a recent graduate of the Art Institute of Chicago, who had already achieved professional success as a designer. Keays later described having conceived the design in a dream, waking her friend in excitement at the moment of what she considered a divine inspiration.

The contest was part of a broader campaign led by Hebard, who was in the second and final year of her term as DAR state regent and was determined to secure legislative adoption of both a state flag and a state flower during the 1917 session. Hebard, a prominent civic figure who served as a cartographer, deputy state engineer, and secretary of the University of Wyoming Board of Trustees, as well as a professor of political economy, viewed the flag as both a lasting memorial to the DAR and a practical necessity. A state flag, she believed, would allow Wyoming troops to carry a distinct emblem if sent into battle. This was during a period of tensions along the Mexican border and the mobilization of the Wyoming National Guard, as well as growing concerns that the United States might be drawn into the Great War.

After the contest concluded, Hebard actively promoted Keays's design, seeking approval from educators and legislators. She later prepared a formal written description of the flag for State Senator William W. Daley of Carbon County, who introduced the bill in the Wyoming Legislature. During the Senate floor debate, each political party proposed substituting the bison with a different animal, but Keays's design ultimately prevailed. Hebard's description specifying the flag's colors, dimensions, and principal motifs was subsequently incorporated directly into the statute. On January 31, 1917, Governor Robert D. Carey signed the state flag bill into law, officially adopting the bison flag.

In Keays's original design, the bison faced the fly. After adoption, however, Hebard insisted that the bison should face the hoist. In personal correspondence, Hebard remarked that a bison on a postcard reproduction of the flag was turned the "wrong way," similar to earlier critiques of deformed bison in other reproductions. This specification was never formally adopted by legislature, but has become the practical standard.

== Other flags ==
44 star American flag flown to celebrate Wyoming statehood

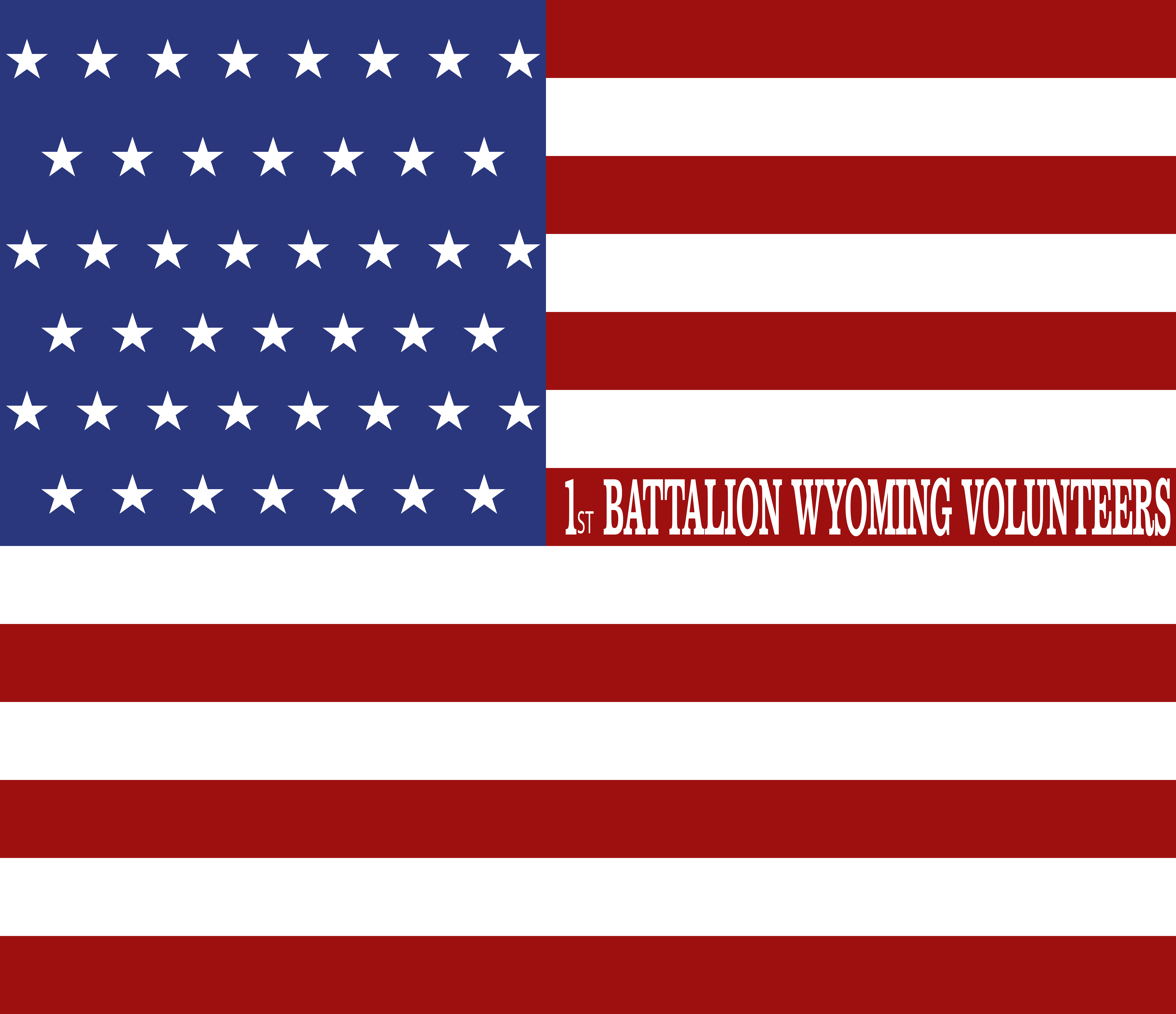
Flag carried by 1st Wyoming Volunteer Infantry Battalion during the Spanish-American War
