= Seal of Wyoming =

Official government emblem of the U.S. state of Wyoming

Great Seal of the State of Wyoming

Versions
- Seal of the Governor
- Armiger: State of Wyoming
- Adopted: 1893
- Motto: Equal Rights

The Great Seal of the State of Wyoming was adopted by the second legislature in 1893, and revised by the sixteenth legislature in 1921.

The two dates on the Great Seal, 1869 and 1890, commemorate the organization of the territorial government and Wyoming's admission to the Union. The draped figure in the center holds a staff from which flows a banner bearing the words, "Equal Rights." The banner symbolizes the political status women have enjoyed in Wyoming since the passage of the territorial suffrage amendment in 1869. The male figures typify the livestock and mining industries of the state. The number 44 on the five-pointed star signifies that Wyoming was the 44th state admitted to the Union. On top of the pillars rest lamps from which burn the Light of Knowledge. Scrolls encircling the two pillars bear the words, Oil, Mines, Livestock, and Grain, four of Wyoming's major industries.

The state seal is displayed in stained glass in the ceilings of both the Wyoming's House of Representatives Chamber and the Wyoming Senate Chamber in the state capital. The seal is also incorporated into the design of the flag of Wyoming, which prominently features the seal set against the silhouette of an American bison.
