= List of highest-income counties in the United States =

There are 3,144 counties and county-equivalents in the United States. The source of the data is the U.S. Census Bureau and the data is current as of the indicated year. Independent cities are considered county-equivalent by the Census Bureau.

== Summary ==
As of 2020, Loudoun County, Virginia, a suburb of Washington, D.C. in Virginia has a median household income of $147,111, the highest of any county in the nation.

== Median household income ==
=== 2020 Census estimates ===
The chart below depicts the 100 highest income counties in the United States by median household income according to the US Census Bureau's American Community Survey data for 2016-2020, in constant 2020 dollars. Virginia has the most counties in the top 100 with 18 followed by California with 11; Maryland with 10; New Jersey with nine; Texas with seven, New York and Illinois with six each; Colorado and Massachusetts with four each; Georgia, Minnesota, and Pennsylvania with three each; Indiana, Ohio, Utah, and Washington with two each; and Alaska, Connecticut, Washington, D.C., Kansas, Kentucky, New Hampshire, New Mexico and Tennessee with one each.

Rank	County or Equivalent	State	Median Household Income
1	Loudoun County	Virginia	$147,111
2	Falls Church	Virginia	$146,922
3	Santa Clara County	California	$130,890
4	San Mateo County	California	$128,091
5	Fairfax County	Virginia	$127,866
6	Howard County	Maryland	$124,042
7	Arlington County	Virginia	$122,604
8	Marin County	California	$121,671
9	Douglas County	Colorado	$121,393
10	Nassau County	(New York (state)) New York	$120,036
11	Los Alamos County	New Mexico	$119,266
12	San Francisco County	California	$119,136
13	Hunterdon County	New Jersey	$117,858
14	Morris County	New Jersey	$117,298
15	Somerset County	New Jersey	$116,510
16	Forsyth County	(Georgia (U.S. state)) Georgia	$112,834
17	Calvert County	Maryland	$112,696
18	Nantucket County	Massachusetts	$112,306
19	Stafford County	Virginia	$112,247
20	Montgomery County	Maryland	$111,812
21	Delaware County	Ohio	$111,411
22	Williamson County	Tennessee	$111,196
23	Fairfax	Virginia	$109,708
24	Prince William County	Virginia	$107,707
25	Putnam County	(New York (state)) New York	$107,246
26	Summit County	Utah	$106,973
27	Middlesex County	Massachusetts	$106,202
28	Rockwall County	Texas	$105,956
29	Fauquier County	Virginia	$105,665
30	Suffolk County	(New York (state)) New York	$105,362
31	Norfolk County	Massachusetts	$105,320
32	Alameda County	California	$104,888
33	Bergen County	New Jersey	$104,623
34	Elbert County	Colorado	$104,231
35	Chester County	Pennsylvania	$104,161
36	Carver County	Minnesota	$104,011
37	Contra Costa County	California	$103,997
38	Oldham County	Kentucky	$103,761
39	Charles County	Maryland	$103,678
40	Monmouth County	New Jersey	$103,523
41	Scott County	Minnesota	$103,261
42	Anne Arundel County	Maryland	$103,225
43	Alexandria	Virginia	$102,227
44	Broomfield County	Colorado	$101,206
45	Poquoson	Virginia	$100,696
46	Frederick County	Maryland	$100,685
47	Collin County	Texas	$100,541
48	Morgan County	Utah	$100,408
49	Fort Bend County	Texas	$100,189
50	Carroll County	Maryland	$99,569
51	Westchester County	(New York (state)) New York	$99,489
52	King County	(Washington (state)) Washington	$99,158
53	Hamilton County	Indiana	$98,880
54	Kendall County	Texas	$98,692
55	New Kent County	Virginia	$97,688
56	Washington County	Minnesota	$97,584
57	Fairfield County	Connecticut	$97,539
58	Goochland County	Virginia	$97,146
59	Kendall County	Illinois	$96,854
60	King George County	Virginia	$96,711
61	Queen Anne's County	Maryland	$96,467
62	Sussex County	New Jersey	$96,222
63	Chambers County	Texas	$95,989
64	St. Mary's County	Maryland	$95,864
65	Oconee County	(Georgia (U.S. state)) Georgia	$95,064
66	DuPage County	Illinois	$94,930
67	Rockland County	(New York (state)) New York	$94,840
68	Orange County	California	$94,441
69	Harford County	Maryland	$94,003
70	Rockingham County	New Hampshire	$93,962
71	Powhatan County	Virginia	$93,833
72	Fayette County	(Georgia (U.S. state)) Georgia	$93,777
73	Placer County	California	$93,677
74	Montgomery County	Pennsylvania	$93,518
75	York County	Virginia	$93,356
76	Bucks County	Pennsylvania	$93,181
77	Plymouth County	Massachusetts	$92,906
78	Lake County	Illinois	$92,654
79	Napa County	California	$92,219
80	Middlesex County	New Jersey	$91,731
81	James City County	Virginia	$91,675
82	Johnson County	Kansas	$91,650
83	Hanover County	Virginia	$91,444
84	Spotsylvania County	Virginia	$90,913
85	Chugach Census Area	Alaska	$90,776
86	Washington	(Washington, D.C.) District of Columbia	$90,842
87	Williamson County	Texas	$90,834
88	Will County	Illinois	$90,800
89	Gilpin County	Colorado	$90,547
90	Denton County	Texas	$90,354
91	Burlington County	New Jersey	$90,329
92	McHenry County	Illinois	$90,014
93	Santa Cruz County	California	$89,986
94	New York County	(New York (state)) New York	$89,812
95	Monroe County	Illinois	$89,648
96	Boone County	Indiana	$89,444
97	Warren County	Ohio	$89,410
98	Ventura County	California	$89,295
99	Snohomish County	(Washington (state)) Washington	$89,273
100	Gloucester County	New Jersey	$89,056

== Per capita income ==
=== 2021 census estimates ===
The following table of the 100 highest income counties in the United States by per capita income is from the American Community Survey data for 2017-2021, in constant 2021 dollars.

Rank	County or Equivalent	State	Per Capita Inc
1	New York County	(New York (state)) New York	$83,008
2	Marin County	California	$78,995
3	Arlington County	Virginia	$77,535
4	San Francisco County	California	$77,267
5	Pitkin County	Colorado	$76,883
6	Falls Church	Virginia	$76,354
7	San Mateo County	California	$69,919
8	Alexandria	Virginia	$68,640
9	Gilpin County	Colorado	$66,627
10	Teton County	Wyoming	$66,296
11	Santa Clara County	California	$65,052
12	Los Alamos County	New Mexico	$64,521
13	Washington	(Washington, D.C.) District of Columbia	$63,793
14	Harding County	New Mexico	$62,435
15	Fairfax County	Virginia	$61,957
16	Morris County	New Jersey	$61,915
17	Westchester County	(New York (state)) New York	$61,830
18	Somerset County	New Jersey	$61,805
19	Fairfield County	Connecticut	$61,651
20	Hunterdon County	New Jersey	$61,328
21	Loudoun County	Virginia	$61,045
22	Summit County	Utah	$60,768
23	Norfolk County	Massachusetts	$60,406
24	King County	(Washington (state)) Washington	$59,843
25	Montgomery County	Maryland	$59,384
26	Howard County	Maryland	$58,560
27	Middlesex County	Massachusetts	$58,399
28	Monmouth County	New Jersey	$57,836
29	Douglas County	Colorado	$57,481
30	Fairfax	Virginia	$57,091
31	Goochland County	Virginia	$57,064
32	Williamson County	Tennessee	$56,545
33	Nassau County	(New York (state)) New York	$55,763
34	Bergen County	New Jersey	$55,710
35	Chester County	Pennsylvania	$55,702
36	Broomfield County	Colorado	$55,176
37	Alameda County	California	$53,815
38	Sublette County	Wyoming	$53,693
39	Contra Costa County	California	$53,656
40	Loving County	Texas	$53,358
41	Montgomery County	Pennsylvania	$53,343
42	Kendall County	Texas	$53,156
43	San Juan County	(Washington (state)) Washington	$52,881
44	Fulton County	(Georgia (U.S. state)) Georgia	$52,842
45	Hamilton County	Indiana	$52,437
46	Boulder County	Colorado	$52,401
47	Delaware County	Ohio	$52,397
48	Clear Creek County	Colorado	$52,364
49	Nantucket County	Massachusetts	$52,324
50	Newport County	Rhode Island	$52,030
51	Bristol County	Rhode Island	$51,917
52	San Miguel County	Colorado	$51,725
53	Johnson County	Kansas	$51,663
54	Rockingham County	New Hampshire	$51,627
55	Dukes County	Massachusetts	$51,354
56	Collier County	Florida	$51,296
57	Talbot County	Maryland	$51,234
58	Anne Arundel County	Maryland	$51,113
59	Ozaukee County	Wisconsin	$51,032
60	Waukesha County	Wisconsin	$50,837
61	Denver County	Colorado	$50,642
62	Routt County	Colorado	$50,571
63	Calvert County	Maryland	$50,496
64	Carver County	Minnesota	$50,492
65	Hennepin County	Minnesota	$50,478
66	DuPage County	Illinois	$50,344
67	Bucks County	Pennsylvania	$50,315
68	Washington County	Minnesota	$50,207
69	Elbert County	Colorado	$50,147
70	Monroe County	Florida	$50,050
71	Barnstable County	Massachusetts	$49,973
72	Albemarle County	Virginia	$49,942
73	Putnam County	(New York (state)) New York	$49,808
74	Kalawao County	Hawaii	$49,700
75	Boone County	Indiana	$49,666
76	Napa County	California	$49,641
77	Forsyth County	(Georgia (U.S. state)) Georgia	$49,506
78	Fauquier County	Virginia	$49,440
78	Lake County	Illinois	$49,440
80	Oconee County	(Georgia (U.S. state)) Georgia	$49,429
81	Suffolk County	(New York (state)) New York	$49,404
82	Jefferson County	Colorado	$49,213
83	Travis County	Texas	$49,191
84	Queen Anne's County	Maryland	$49,178
85	Oakland County	Michigan	$49,012
86	Eagle County	Colorado	$49,010
87	El Dorado County	California	$48,953
88	Plymouth County	Massachusetts	$48,785
89	Sussex County	New Jersey	$48,744
90	Rappahannock County	Virginia	$48,672
91	Middlesex County	Connecticut	$48,670
92	Placer County	California	$48,580
93	Summit County	Colorado	$48,488
94	Collin County	Texas	$48,438
95	Sarasota County	Florida	$48,265
96	Chatham County	North Carolina	$48,143
97	Suffolk County	Massachusetts	$47,916
98	Saratoga County	(New York (state)) New York	$47,902
99	Litchfield County	Connecticut	$47,811
100	Rockwall County	Texas	$47,802

== Highest-income counties and places by state ==
For more detailed lists of rankings of counties and places in the individual states, see the following pages:

- Alabama
- Alaska
- Arizona
- Arkansas
- California
- Colorado
- Connecticut
- Delaware
- Florida
- Georgia
- Hawaii
- Idaho
- Illinois
- Indiana
- Iowa
- Kansas
- Kentucky
- Louisiana
- Maine
- Maryland
- Massachusetts
- Michigan
- Minnesota
- Mississippi
- Missouri
- Montana
- Nebraska
- Nevada
- New Hampshire
- New Jersey
- New Mexico
- New York
- North Carolina
- North Dakota
- Ohio
- Oklahoma
- Oregon
- Pennsylvania
- Rhode Island
- South Carolina
- South Dakota
- Tennessee
- Texas
- Utah
- Vermont
- Virginia
- Washington
- West Virginia
- Wisconsin
- Wyoming

== See also ==
- List of lowest-income counties in the United States
- List of United States counties by per capita income
