= List of counties in Pennsylvania =

Counties of Pennsylvania
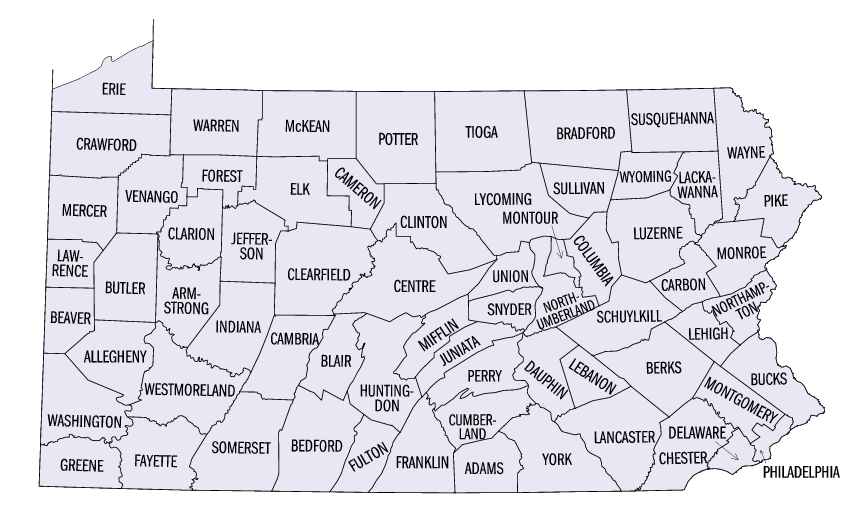
- Pennsylvania counties (clickable map)
- Location: Pennsylvania
- Number: 67
- Populations: 4,211 (Cameron) – 1,574,281 (Philadelphia)
- Areas: 132 square miles (340 km^{2}) (Montour) – 1,244 square miles (3,220 km^{2}) (Lycoming)
- Government: County government

The following is a list of the 67 counties (Pennsylvania German: Kaundis, singular Kaundi) of the U.S. state of Pennsylvania. The city of Philadelphia is coterminous with Philadelphia County, the municipalities having been consolidated in 1854, and all remaining county government functions having been merged into the city after a 1951 referendum. Eight of the ten most populous counties are in the southeastern portion of the state, including four of the top five, and eight of the top ten most populous counties are in either the Greater Philadelphia or Greater Pittsburgh metropolitan statistical areas.

== FIPS code ==
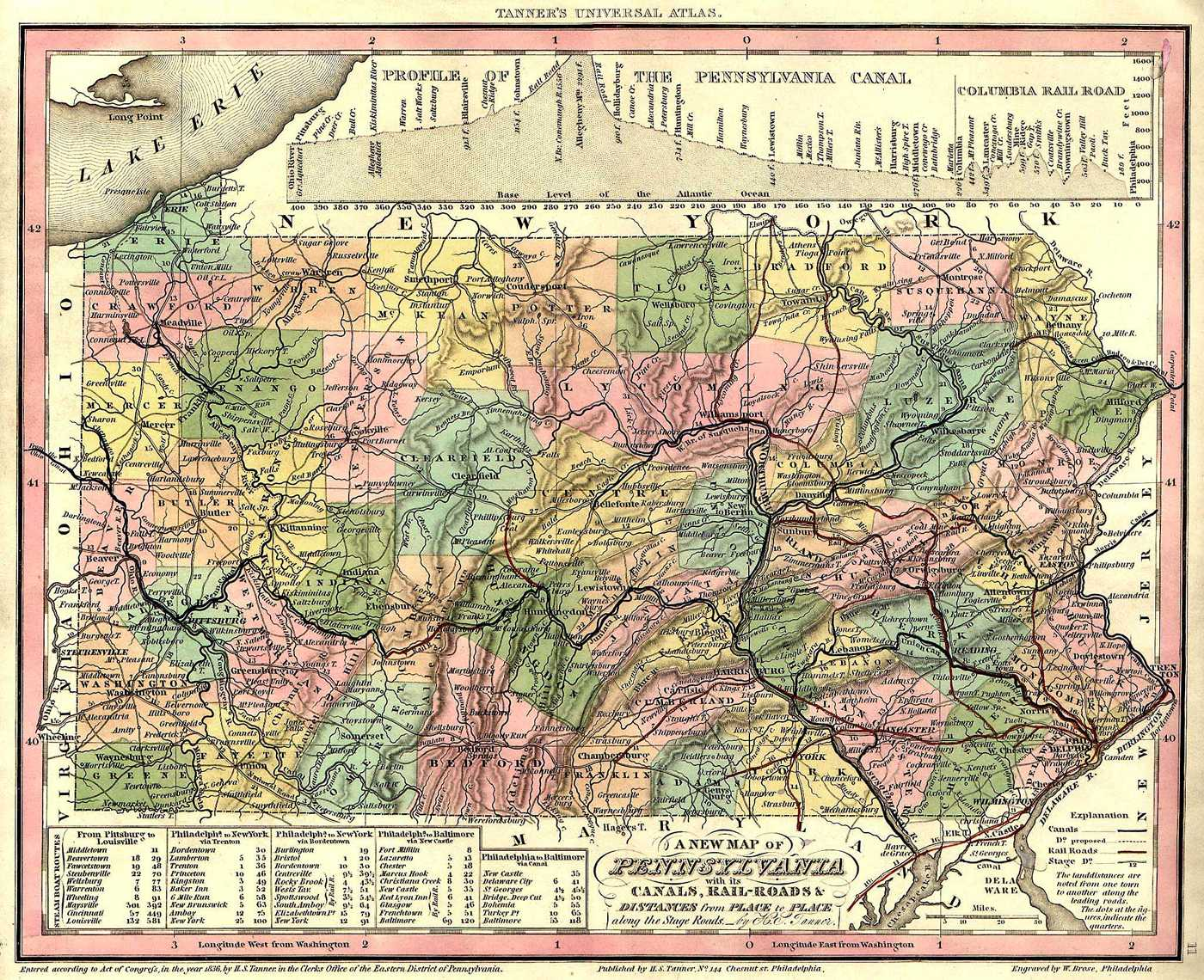
An 1836 map of Pennsylvania's counties

The Federal Information Processing Standards (FIPS) code, used by the U.S. government to uniquely identify counties, is provided with each entry. FIPS codes are five-digit numbers; for Pennsylvania the codes start with 42 and are completed with the three-digit county code. The FIPS code for each county in the table links to census data for the specific county.

== County list ==
County	FIPS code	County seat	Established	Origin	Etymology	Population	Area	Map
Adams County	001	Gettysburg	January 22, 1800	Parts of York County	John Adams, second U.S. president	107,594	522 sq mi (1,352 km^{2})	State map highlighting Adams County
Allegheny County	003	Pittsburgh	September 24, 1788	Parts of Washington and Westmoreland counties	Delaware word for the Allegheny River, which possibly translates to "beautiful river"	1,225,035	745 sq mi (1,930 km^{2})	State map highlighting Allegheny County
Armstrong County	005	Kittanning	March 12, 1800	Parts of Allegheny, Lycoming, and Westmoreland counties	John Armstrong, Revolutionary War general	63,698	664 sq mi (1,720 km^{2})	State map highlighting Armstrong County
Beaver County	007	Beaver	March 12, 1800	Parts of Allegheny and Washington counties	Beaver River, itself named for the beaver that was seen along its banks	166,032	444 sq mi (1,150 km^{2})	State map highlighting Beaver County
Bedford County	009	Bedford	March 9, 1771	Parts of Cumberland County	Fort Bedford, which is named for John Russell, 4th Duke of Bedford	47,480	1,015 sq mi (2,629 km^{2})	State map highlighting Bedford County
Berks County	011	Reading	March 11, 1752	Parts of Chester, Lancaster and Philadelphia counties	The English county of Berkshire	440,072	866 sq mi (2,243 km^{2})	State map highlighting Berks County
Blair County	013	Hollidaysburg	July 27, 1846	Parts of Huntingdon and Bedford counties	John Blair (1766-1832) a local pioneer farmer, merchant, and public servant	119,541	527 sq mi (1,365 km^{2})	State map highlighting Blair County
Bradford County	015	Towanda	February 21, 1810	Parts of Luzerne and Lycoming counties; originally called Ontario County, renamed as Bradford County in 1812.	William Bradford, second U.S. attorney general	59,600	1,161 sq mi (3,007 km^{2})	State map highlighting Bradford County
Bucks County	017	Doylestown	August 24, 1682	One of the original counties at the formation of Pennsylvania	The English county of Buckinghamshire	647,828	622 sq mi (1,611 km^{2})	State map highlighting Bucks County
Butler County	019	Butler	March 12, 1800	Parts of Allegheny County	Richard Butler, Revolutionary War general	200,169	795 sq mi (2,059 km^{2})	State map highlighting Butler County
Cambria County	021	Ebensburg	March 26, 1804	Parts of Somerset and Huntingdon counties	Cambria, a name for Wales	128,968	693 sq mi (1,795 km^{2})	State map highlighting Cambria County
Cameron County	023	Emporium	October 12, 1860	Parts of Clinton, Elk, McKean, and Potter counties	Simon Cameron, senator from Pennsylvania	4,211	399 sq mi (1,033 km^{2})	State map highlighting Cameron County
Carbon County	025	Jim Thorpe	September 1, 1843	Parts of Monroe and Northampton Counties	Carbon, the element found in coal	65,868	387 sq mi (1,002 km^{2})	State map highlighting Carbon County
Centre County	027	Bellefonte	February 13, 1800	Parts of Lycoming, Mifflin, Northumberland, and Huntingdon counties	Centre Furnace, the first industrial facility in the area	157,393	1,112 sq mi (2,880 km^{2})	State map highlighting Centre County
Chester County	029	West Chester	August 24, 1682	One of the original counties at the formation of Pennsylvania	The English city of Chester in the county of Cheshire	557,116	760 sq mi (1,968 km^{2})	State map highlighting Chester County
Clarion County	031	Clarion	September 1, 1840	Parts of Venango and Armstrong counties	Clarion River, itself so named for its clarity	36,680	609 sq mi (1,577 km^{2})	State map highlighting Clarion County
Clearfield County	033	Clearfield	March 26, 1804	Parts of Lycoming and Huntingdon counties; Clearfield functioned as a part of Centre County for judiciary purposes until 1822.	The cleared fields from logging in the area	78,100	1,154 sq mi (2,989 km^{2})	State map highlighting Clearfield County
Clinton County	035	Lock Haven	June 21, 1839	Parts of Lycoming and Centre counties	DeWitt Clinton, governor of New York and prominent statesman	37,870	898 sq mi (2,326 km^{2})	State map highlighting Clinton County
Columbia County	037	Bloomsburg	September 6, 1813	Parts of Northumberland and Luzerne counties	Columbia, the first popular and poetic name for the United States	66,193	490 sq mi (1,269 km^{2})	State map highlighting Columbia County
Crawford County	039	Meadville	March 12, 1800	Parts of Allegheny County	Colonel William Crawford, surveyor who helped to open trans-Appalachian lands to settlement	81,792	1,038 sq mi (2,688 km^{2})	State map highlighting Crawford County
Cumberland County	041	Carlisle	January 27, 1750	Parts of Lancaster County	The historic English county of Cumberland	277,270	551 sq mi (1,427 km^{2})	State map highlighting Cumberland County
Dauphin County	043	Harrisburg	March 4, 1785	Parts of Lancaster County	Louis-Joseph, Dauphin of France	293,351	558 sq mi (1,445 km^{2})	State map highlighting Dauphin County
Delaware County	045	Media	September 26, 1789	Parts of Chester County	Delaware River, itself named for Lord De La Warr	580,937	191 sq mi (495 km^{2})	State map highlighting Delaware County
Elk County	047	Ridgway	April 18, 1843	Parts of Jefferson, McKean, and Clearfield counties	Elk, which inhabit the forested county	29,926	832 sq mi (2,155 km^{2})	State map highlighting Elk County
Erie County	049	Erie	March 12, 1800	Parts of Allegheny County; attached to Crawford County until 1803.	Lake Erie	265,832	799 sq mi (2,069 km^{2})	State map highlighting Erie County
Fayette County	051	Uniontown	September 26, 1783	Parts of Westmoreland County	The Marquis de Lafayette, French-born Revolutionary War general	123,021	798 sq mi (2,067 km^{2})	State map highlighting Fayette County
Forest County	053	Tionesta	April 11, 1848	Parts of Jefferson County; attached to Jefferson County until 1857.	Chief natural feature	6,614	431 sq mi (1,116 km^{2})	State map highlighting Forest County
Franklin County	055	Chambersburg	September 9, 1784	Parts of Cumberland County	Benjamin Franklin, key Founding Father of the United States	160,652	771 sq mi (1,997 km^{2})	State map highlighting Franklin County
Fulton County	057	McConnellsburg	September 1, 1850	Parts of Bedford County	Robert Fulton, inventor of the steamboat	14,483	438 sq mi (1,134 km^{2})	State map highlighting Fulton County
Greene County	059	Waynesburg	February 9, 1796	Parts of Washington County	Nathanael Greene, Revolutionary War general	33,885	578 sq mi (1,497 km^{2})	State map highlighting Greene County
Huntingdon County	061	Huntingdon	September 20, 1787	Parts of Bedford County	The historic English county of Huntingdonshire	43,001	889 sq mi (2,302 km^{2})	State map highlighting Huntingdon County
Indiana County	063	Indiana	March 30, 1803	Parts of Lycoming and Westmoreland counties; attached to Westmoreland County until 1806	From the Indiana Grant of 1768, that the Iroquois Six Nations were forced to make to "suffering traders" under the Fort Stanwix Treaty of 1768	82,878	834 sq mi (2,160 km^{2})	State map highlighting Indiana County
Jefferson County	065	Brookville	March 26, 1804	Parts of Lycoming County. Attached to Westmoreland County until 1806 and to Indiana County until 1830.	Thomas Jefferson, third U.S. president	43,255	657 sq mi (1,702 km^{2})	State map highlighting Jefferson County
Juniata County	067	Mifflintown	September 1, 1831	Parts of Mifflin County	Juniata River, itself named for the Iroquoian word Onayutta, meaning "Standing Stone"	23,403	394 sq mi (1,020 km^{2})	State map highlighting Juniata County
Lackawanna County	069	Scranton	August 21, 1878	Parts of Luzerne County	Lackawanna River, itself named for the Delaware word meaning "stream that forks"	216,502	465 sq mi (1,204 km^{2})	State map highlighting Lackawanna County
Lancaster County	071	Lancaster	May 10, 1729	Parts of Chester County	The English city of Lancaster	563,159	984 sq mi (2,549 km^{2})	State map highlighting Lancaster County
Lawrence County	073	New Castle	September 1, 1849	Parts of Beaver and Mercer counties	USS Lawrence, itself named in honor of James Lawrence, War of 1812 captain	83,911	363 sq mi (940 km^{2})	State map highlighting Lawrence County
Lebanon County	075	Lebanon	February 16, 1813	Parts of Dauphin and Lancaster counties	Lebanon, the Biblical term for "White Mountain"; refers to the piety of the county's Moravian founders	146,380	363 sq mi (940 km^{2})	State map highlighting Lebanon County
Lehigh County	077	Allentown	March 6, 1812	Parts of Northampton County	Lehigh River, from the Lenape Lechewuekink, "where there are forks"	384,383	349 sq mi (904 km^{2})	State map highlighting Lehigh County
Luzerne County	079	Wilkes-Barre	September 25, 1786	Parts of Northumberland County	Anne-César de La Luzerne, French ambassador to the U.S. who aided republican causes	332,126	907 sq mi (2,349 km^{2})	State map highlighting Luzerne County
Lycoming County	081	Williamsport	April 13, 1795	Parts of Northumberland County; originally called Jefferson County; was renamed Lycoming County.	Lycoming Creek, itself named for the Delaware word iacomic, meaning "great steam"	112,587	1,244 sq mi (3,222 km^{2})	State map highlighting Lycoming County
McKean County	083	Smethport	March 26, 1804	Parts of Lycoming County; Attached to Centre County until 1814 and to Lycoming County until 1826 for judicial and elective purposes. McKean was fully organized only in 1826.	Thomas McKean, second governor of Pennsylvania	38,984	984 sq mi (2,549 km^{2})	State map highlighting McKean County
Mercer County	085	Mercer	March 12, 1800	Parts of Allegheny County	Hugh Mercer, Revolutionary War general	107,860	683 sq mi (1,769 km^{2})	State map highlighting Mercer County
Mifflin County	087	Lewistown	September 19, 1789	Parts of Cumberland and Northumberland counties	Thomas Mifflin, first governor of Pennsylvania	46,127	415 sq mi (1,075 km^{2})	State map highlighting Mifflin County
Monroe County	089	Stroudsburg	September 1, 1836	Parts of Pike and Northampton counties	James Monroe, fifth U.S. president	167,179	617 sq mi (1,598 km^{2})	State map highlighting Monroe County
Montgomery County	091	Norristown	September 10, 1784	Parts of Philadelphia County	The historic Welsh county of Montgomeryshire or Richard Montgomery, a general killed in the 1775 Battle of Quebec	877,643	487 sq mi (1,261 km^{2})	State map highlighting Montgomery County
Montour County	093	Danville	November 1, 1850	Parts of Columbia County	Madame Montour, colonial ambassador to the Native Americans	17,868	132 sq mi (342 km^{2})	State map highlighting Montour County
Northampton County	095	Easton	March 11, 1752	Parts of Bucks County	The English town of Northampton	324,411	377 sq mi (976 km^{2})	State map highlighting Northampton County
Northumberland County	097	Sunbury	March 21, 1722	Parts of Lancaster, Berks, Bedford, Cumberland, and Northampton counties	The English county of Northumberland	89,920	477 sq mi (1,235 km^{2})	State map highlighting Northumberland County
Perry County	099	New Bloomfield	September 1, 1820	Parts of Cumberland County	Oliver Hazard Perry, War of 1812 commodore	46,806	556 sq mi (1,440 km^{2})	State map highlighting Perry County
Philadelphia County	101	Philadelphia	August 24, 1682	One of the original counties at the formation of Pennsylvania	"Brotherly love" from Greek philos ("love") and adelphos ("brother")	1,574,281	143 sq mi (370 km^{2})	State map highlighting Philadelphia County
Pike County	103	Milford	January 1814	Parts of Wayne County	Zebulon Pike, explorer of the American West	62,808	567 sq mi (1,469 km^{2})	State map highlighting Pike County
Potter County	105	Coudersport	March 26, 1804	From Lycoming county Attached to Lycoming County until 1826 and to McKean County until 1835 for judicial purposes, Potter was not fully organized until 1835.	James Potter, Revolutionary War general	15,897	1,081 sq mi (2,800 km^{2})	State map highlighting Potter County
Schuylkill County	107	Pottsville	March 1, 1811	Parts of Berks and Northampton counties	Schuylkill River, itself a Dutch corruption of a Delaware word possibly meaning "hidden river"	145,085	778 sq mi (2,015 km^{2})	State map highlighting Schuylkill County
Snyder County	109	Middleburg	December 1, 1855	Parts of Union County	Simon Snyder, third governor of Pennsylvania	39,655	332 sq mi (860 km^{2})	State map highlighting Snyder County
Somerset County	111	Somerset	April 17, 1795	Parts of Bedford County	The historic English county of Somerset	72,004	1,081 sq mi (2,800 km^{2})	State map highlighting Somerset County
Sullivan County	113	Laporte	January 3, 1848	Parts of Lycoming County; attached to Lycoming until 1848.	John Sullivan, Revolutionary War general	5,856	452 sq mi (1,171 km^{2})	State map highlighting Sullivan County
Susquehanna County	115	Montrose	February 21, 1810	Parts of Luzerne County; attached to Luzerne County until 1812.	Susquehanna River, itself named after an Algonquin word for "muddy current"	38,237	832 sq mi (2,155 km^{2})	State map highlighting Susquehanna County
Tioga County	117	Wellsboro	March 26, 1804	Parts of Lycoming County; attached to Lycoming until 1812.	Tioga River, itself named for the Delaware word for "forks of the stream"	40,502	1,137 sq mi (2,945 km^{2})	State map highlighting Tioga County
Union County	119	Lewisburg	November 1, 1813	Parts of Northumberland County	The federal union of states	42,313	317 sq mi (821 km^{2})	State map highlighting Union County
Venango County	121	Franklin	March 12, 1800	Parts of Allegheny and Lycoming counties; attached to until 1805.	A corruption of the Delaware word onenge, meaning "otter"	49,346	683 sq mi (1,769 km^{2})	State map highlighting Venango County
Warren County	123	Warren	March 12, 1800	Parts of Allegheny and Lycoming counties; attached to Crawford County until 1805 and then to Venango until Warren was formally organized in 1819.	Joseph Warren, Revolutionary War general	37,038	898 sq mi (2,326 km^{2})	State map highlighting Warren County
Washington County	125	Washington	March 28, 1781	Parts of Westmoreland County	George Washington, first U.S. president	210,802	861 sq mi (2,230 km^{2})	State map highlighting Washington County
Wayne County	127	Honesdale	March 21, 1798	Parts of Northampton County	Anthony Wayne, Revolutionary War general	51,703	751 sq mi (1,945 km^{2})	State map highlighting Wayne County
Westmoreland County	129	Greensburg	February 26, 1773	Parts of Bedford County	The historic English county of Westmorland	349,324	1,036 sq mi (2,683 km^{2})	State map highlighting Westmoreland County
Wyoming County	131	Tunkhannock	May 1, 1843	Parts of Luzerne County	The Delaware word xwéːwaməŋk, meaning "at the big river flat"	25,790	405 sq mi (1,049 km^{2})	State map highlighting Wyoming County
York County	133	York	August 19, 1749	Parts of Lancaster County	The English city of York	473,197	910 sq mi (2,357 km^{2})	State map highlighting York County

== Racial / Ethnic Profile of counties in Pennsylvania (2020 Census) ==
Racial / Ethnic Profile of counties in Pennsylvania (2020 Census)
Following is a table of counties in Pennsylvania by race/ethnicity. The majority racial/ethnic group is coded per the key below.

Majority minority with no dominant group
Majority White
Majority Black
Majority Hispanic
Majority Asian

Racial and ethnic composition of counties in Pennsylvania (2020 Census) (NH = Non-Hispanic) Note: the US Census treats Hispanic/Latino as an ethnic category. This table excludes Latinos from the racial categories and assigns them to a separate category. Hispanics/Latinos may be of any race.
County	Location of County	Total Population	White alone (NH)	%	Black or African American alone (NH)	%	Native American or Alaska Native alone (NH)	%	Asian alone (NH)	%	Pacific Islander alone (NH)	%	Other race alone (NH)	%	Mixed race or Multiracial (NH)	%	Hispanic or Latino (any race)	%
Adams		103,852	89,945	86.61%	1,473	1.42%	147	0.14%	952	0.92%	33	0.03%	333	0.32%	3,179	3.06%	7,790	7.50%
Allegheny		1,250,578	938,252	75.03%	161,554	12.92%	1,305	0.10%	58,318	4.66%	304	0.02%	6,064	0.48%	50,456	4.03%	34,325	2.74%
Armstrong		65,558	62,320	95.06%	438	0.67%	57	0.09%	147	0.22%	14	0.02%	120	0.18%	1,972	3.01%	490	0.75%
Beaver		168,215	143,881	85.53%	11,069	6.58%	195	0.12%	1,022	0.61%	53	0.03%	613	0.36%	7,771	4.62%	3,611	2.15%
Bedford		47,577	45,381	95.38%	181	0.38%	66	0.14%	153	0.32%	0	0.00%	50	0.11%	1,227	2.58%	519	1.09%
Berks		428,849	291,258	67.92%	18,087	4.22%	450	0.10%	6,225	1.45%	61	0.01%	1,551	0.36%	11,667	2.72%	99,550	23.21%
Blair		122,822	113,016	92.02%	2,463	2.01%	134	0.11%	868	0.71%	12	0.01%	367	0.30%	4,254	3.46%	1,708	1.39%
Bradford		59,967	55,717	92.91%	394	0.66%	117	0.20%	460	0.77%	13	0.02%	133	0.22%	2,260	3.77%	873	1.46%
Bucks		646,538	521,575	80.67%	25,277	3.91%	531	0.08%	35,053	5.42%	143	0.02%	2,512	0.39%	21,677	3.35%	39,770	6.15%
Butler		193,763	178,081	91.91%	2,174	1.12%	154	0.08%	2,792	1.44%	36	0.02%	577	0.30%	6,284	3.24%	3,665	1.89%
Cambria		133,472	119,380	89.44%	5,665	4.24%	96	0.07%	764	0.57%	35	0.03%	320	0.24%	4,747	3.56%	2,465	1.85%
Cameron		4,547	4,271	93.93%	12	0.26%	8	0.18%	29	0.64%	0	0.00%	12	0.26%	129	2.84%	86	1.89%
Carbon		64,749	57,439	88.71%	1,070	1.65%	95	0.15%	327	0.50%	14	0.02%	216	0.33%	1,946	3.01%	3,642	5.62%
Centre		158,172	129,668	81.98%	5,306	3.35%	120	0.08%	11,373	7.19%	39	0.02%	596	0.38%	5,419	3.43%	5,651	3.57%
Chester		534,413	405,476	75.87%	28,391	5.31%	532	0.10%	35,143	6.58%	119	0.02%	2,249	0.42%	18,961	3.55%	43,542	8.15%
Clarion		37,241	35,023	94.04%	521	1.40%	39	0.10%	175	0.47%	15	0.04%	111	0.30%	970	2.60%	387	1.04%
Clearfield		80,562	73,338	91.03%	1,760	2.18%	78	0.10%	450	0.56%	0	0.00%	146	0.18%	2,153	2.67%	2,637	3.27%
Clinton		37,450	34,933	93.28%	416	1.11%	51	0.14%	211	0.56%	7	0.02%	70	0.19%	1,100	2.94%	662	1.77%
Columbia		64,727	58,831	90.89%	867	1.34%	71	0.11%	748	1.16%	17	0.03%	159	0.25%	1,894	2.93%	2,140	3.31%
Crawford		83,938	77,347	92.15%	1,496	1.78%	109	0.13%	365	0.43%	26	0.03%	229	0.27%	3,125	3.72%	1,241	1.48%
Cumberland		259,469	211,990	81.70%	10,581	4.08%	318	0.12%	13,836	5.33%	113	0.04%	1,074	0.41%	9,582	3.69%	11,975	4.62%
Dauphin		286,401	175,175	61.16%	48,404	16.90%	396	0.14%	17,183	6.00%	88	0.03%	1,465	0.51%	12,439	4.34%	31,251	10.91%
Delaware		576,830	363,249	62.97%	127,055	22.03%	676	0.12%	36,317	6.30%	133	0.02%	2,596	0.45%	20,032	3.47%	26,772	4.64%
Elk		30,990	29,466	95.08%	74	0.24%	16	0.05%	113	0.36%	12	0.04%	46	0.15%	969	3.13%	294	0.95%
Erie		270,876	219,180	80.92%	19,821	7.32%	343	0.13%	6,358	2.35%	58	0.02%	1,046	0.39%	12,040	4.44%	12,030	4.44%
Fayette		128,804	115,322	89.53%	5,703	4.43%	166	0.13%	376	0.29%	160	0.12%	313	0.24%	5,186	4.03%	1,578	1.23%
Forest		6,973	5,278	75.69%	1,235	17.71%	8	0.11%	17	0.24%	0	0.00%	4	0.06%	108	1.55%	323	4.63%
Franklin		155,932	132,566	85.02%	4,998	3.21%	242	0.16%	1,408	0.90%	40	0.03%	501	0.32%	5,413	3.47%	10,764	6.90%
Fulton		14,556	13,726	94.30%	124	0.85%	25	0.17%	41	0.28%	3	0.02%	17	0.12%	474	3.26%	146	1.00%
Greene		35,954	32,898	91.50%	1,062	2.95%	69	0.19%	120	0.33%	6	0.02%	63	0.18%	1,226	3.41%	510	1.42%
Huntingdon		44,092	39,420	89.40%	2,267	5.14%	49	0.11%	210	0.48%	9	0.02%	100	0.23%	1,185	2.69%	852	1.93%
Indiana		83,246	75,718	90.96%	2,409	2.89%	116	0.14%	816	0.98%	7	0.01%	148	0.18%	2,556	3.07%	1,476	1.77%
Jefferson		44,492	42,317	95.11%	125	0.28%	45	0.10%	100	0.22%	8	0.02%	92	0.21%	1,408	3.16%	397	0.89%
Juniata		23,509	21,830	92.86%	115	0.49%	19	0.08%	69	0.29%	4	0.02%	48	0.20%	516	2.20%	908	3.86%
Lackawanna		215,896	175,246	81.17%	7,415	3.43%	276	0.13%	6,762	3.13%	28	0.01%	828	0.38%	7,074	3.28%	18,267	8.46%
Lancaster		552,984	440,613	79.68%	19,536	3.53%	522	0.09%	13,939	2.52%	110	0.02%	1,922	0.35%	15,171	2.74%	61,171	11.06%
Lawrence		86,070	75,811	88.08%	3,546	4.12%	75	0.09%	321	0.37%	4	0.00%	251	0.29%	4,407	5.12%	1,655	1.92%
Lebanon		143,257	114,004	79.58%	2,555	1.78%	119	0.08%	2,192	1.53%	39	0.03%	460	0.32%	3,540	2.47%	20,348	14.20%
Lehigh		374,557	227,994	60.87%	22,950	6.13%	337	0.09%	13,725	3.66%	91	0.02%	1,779	0.47%	10,700	2.86%	96,981	25.89%
Luzerne		325,594	250,304	76.88%	14,031	4.31%	295	0.09%	3,960	1.22%	65	0.02%	985	0.30%	9,056	2.78%	46,898	14.40%
Lycoming		114,188	99,687	87.30%	5,672	4.97%	191	0.17%	923	0.81%	27	0.02%	383	0.34%	4,931	4.32%	2,374	2.08%
McKean		40,432	36,991	91.49%	849	2.10%	102	0.25%	193	0.48%	2	0.00%	82	0.20%	1,571	3.89%	642	1.59%
Mercer		110,652	96,998	87.66%	6,289	5.68%	116	0.10%	683	0.62%	14	0.01%	342	0.31%	4,601	4.16%	1,609	1.45%
Mifflin		46,143	43,343	93.93%	350	0.76%	51	0.11%	160	0.35%	0	0.00%	78	0.17%	1,182	2.56%	979	2.12%
Monroe		168,327	104,716	62.21%	22,823	13.56%	289	0.17%	3,947	2.34%	56	0.03%	1,407	0.84%	6,531	3.88%	28,558	16.97%
Montgomery		856,553	618,244	72.18%	79,510	9.28%	763	0.09%	67,761	7.91%	168	0.02%	3,863	0.45%	31,732	3.70%	54,512	6.36%
Montour		18,136	16,105	88.80%	320	1.76%	27	0.15%	668	3.68%	0	0.00%	22	0.12%	507	2.80%	487	2.69%
Northampton		312,951	228,373	72.97%	17,429	5.57%	251	0.08%	9,892	3.16%	75	0.02%	1,647	0.53%	10,687	3.42%	44,597	14.25%
Northumberland		91,647	81,689	89.14%	2,392	2.61%	110	0.12%	444	0.48%	24	0.03%	199	0.22%	2,638	2.88%	4,151	4.53%
Perry		45,842	42,838	93.45%	289	0.63%	50	0.11%	139	0.30%	3	0.01%	139	0.30%	1,472	3.21%	912	1.99%
Philadelphia		1,603,797	550,828	34.35%	613,835	38.27%	2,596	0.16%	132,408	8.26%	579	0.04%	11,419	0.71%	53,855	3.36%	238,277	14.86%
Pike		58,535	45,375	77.52%	3,027	5.17%	121	0.21%	841	1.44%	14	0.02%	234	0.40%	2,204	3.77%	6,719	11.48%
Potter		16,396	15,494	94.50%	43	0.26%	25	0.15%	69	0.42%	0	0.00%	52	0.32%	466	2.84%	247	1.51%
Schuylkill		143,049	126,192	88.22%	4,115	2.88%	155	0.11%	748	0.52%	13	0.01%	287	0.20%	3,475	2.43%	8,064	5.64%
Snyder		39,736	36,992	93.09%	504	1.27%	32	0.08%	296	0.74%	11	0.03%	58	0.15%	866	2.18%	977	2.46%
Somerset		74,129	69,044	93.14%	1,863	2.51%	50	0.07%	194	0.26%	7	0.01%	126	0.17%	1,808	2.44%	1,037	1.40%
Sullivan		5,840	5,406	92.57%	77	1.32%	9	0.15%	17	0.29%	0	0.00%	29	0.50%	197	3.37%	105	1.80%
Susquehanna		38,434	35,799	93.14%	138	0.36%	59	0.15%	135	0.35%	0	0.00%	98	0.25%	1,358	3.53%	847	2.20%
Tioga		41,045	38,257	93.21%	321	0.78%	73	0.18%	189	0.46%	7	0.02%	99	0.24%	1,459	3.55%	640	1.56%
Union		42,681	36,050	84.46%	2,459	5.76%	82	0.19%	814	1.91%	8	0.02%	112	0.26%	1,156	2.71%	2,000	4.69%
Venango		50,454	47,117	93.39%	434	0.86%	68	0.13%	172	0.34%	10	0.02%	96	0.19%	1,980	3.92%	577	1.14%
Warren		38,587	36,310	94.10%	144	0.37%	71	0.18%	154	0.40%	5	0.01%	57	0.15%	1,431	3.71%	415	1.08%
Washington		209,349	186,900	89.28%	6,861	3.28%	230	0.11%	1,998	0.95%	63	0.03%	620	0.30%	8,656	4.13%	4,021	1.92%
Wayne		51,155	44,821	87.62%	1,647	3.22%	73	0.14%	418	0.82%	0	0.00%	165	0.32%	1,684	3.29%	2,347	4.59%
Westmoreland		354,663	323,114	91.11%	8,985	2.53%	295	0.08%	3,301	0.93%	36	0.01%	953	0.27%	12,749	3.59%	5,230	1.47%
Wyoming		26,069	24,142	92.61%	214	0.82%	32	0.12%	115	0.44%	3	0.01%	40	0.15%	942	3.61%	581	2.23%
York		456,438	365,353	80.04%	25,768	5.65%	640	0.14%	6,557	1.44%	118	0.03%	1,768	0.39%	16,874	3.70%	39,360	8.62%

== Former counties ==
The Province of Pennsylvania's Three Lower Counties were transferred from New York Colony in 1682. In 1701, these counties became a separate colony called Delaware Colony, although it shared the same colonial governor as Pennsylvania until independence in 1776.

County	FIPS code	County seat	Est.	History	Etymology	Population	Area	Map
Kent County	001	Dover	1683	Created from Whorekill (Hoarkill) District. Formerly known as St. Jones County.	The English county of Kent	194,786	800 sq mi (2,072 km^{2})	State map highlighting Kent County
New Castle County	003	Wilmington	1673	Original County (formally New Amstel)	The town of New Castle, Delaware as an anglicization of Nieuw Amstel	588,026	494 sq mi (1,279 km^{2})	State map highlighting New Castle County
Sussex County	005	Georgetown	1683	Created from Whorekill (Hoarkill) District. Formerly known as Deale County.	The English county of Sussex	277,140	1,196 sq mi (3,098 km^{2})	State map highlighting Sussex County

== See also ==
- List of Pennsylvania counties by per capita income
- List of county seats in Pennsylvania (by population)
- List of Pennsylvania Municipalities and Counties with Home Rule Charters, Optional Charters, or Optional Plans
- List of municipalities in Pennsylvania
- List of cities in Pennsylvania
- List of towns and boroughs in Pennsylvania
- List of townships in Pennsylvania
