= List of Tennessee locations by per capita income =

Tennessee is the thirty-fifth-richest state in the United States of America, with a per capita income of $28,764 (2017).

== Tennessee counties ranked by per capita income ==
Note: Data is from the 2010 United States Census Data and the 2006–2010 American Community Survey 5-Year Estimates.

Rank	County	Per capita income	Median household income	Median family income	Population	Number of households
1	Williamson	$27,925	$87,832	$100,407	183,182	64,886
2	Wilson	$27,814	$60,678	$70,092	113,993	42,563
3	Davidson	$27,780	$45,668	$56,084	626,681	259,499
4	Knox	$27,349	$46,759	$62,272	432,226	177,249
	United States	$27,334	$51,914	$62,982	308,745,538	116,716,292
5	Loudon	$27,046	$49,343	$59,044	48,556	19,826
6	Fayette	$26,898	$56,729	$63,186	38,413	14,505
7	Moore	$26,678	$44,433	$57,888	6,362	2,492
8	Hamilton	$26,588	$45,408	$58,004	336,463	136,682
9	Sumner	$26,014	$54,916	$65,313	160,645	60,975
10	Shelby	$25,002	$44,705	$55,923	927,644	350,971
11	Cheatham	$24,392	$52,585	$61,603	39,105	14,520
12	Rutherford	$24,390	$53,770	$63,483	262,604	96,232
13	Anderson	$24,242	$44,650	$55,895	75,129	31,253
14	Washington	$24,114	$41,256	$51,712	122,979	51,322
15	Blount	$24,071	$47,322	$56,516	123,010	49,265
	Tennessee	$23,722	$43,314	$53,246	6,346,105	2,493,552
16	Sullivan	$23,263	$39,957	$50,677	156,823	66,298
17	Roane	$23,196	$42,698	$51,924	54,181	22,376
18	Maury	$23,136	$46,278	$56,241	80,956	31,663
19	Madison	$22,948	$40,178	$52,043	98,294	38,073
20	Lincoln	$22,811	$42,962	$53,075	33,361	13,382
21	Robertson	$22,658	$50,820	$58,589	66,283	24,197
22	Montgomery	$22,092	$48,930	$55,447	172,331	63,673
23	Sevier	$22,047	$41,476	$48,446	89,889	35,343
24	Tipton	$21,585	$49,378	$57,623	61,081	21,617
25	Bradley	$21,444	$40,032	$48,850	98,963	37,947
26	Dickson	$21,415	$44,554	$53,521	49,666	19,107
27	Obion	$21,235	$39,543	$47,837	31,807	13,077
28	Hamblen	$21,162	$39,807	$48,353	62,544	24,560
29	Smith	$21,026	$43,200	$50,631	19,166	7,410
30	Humphreys	$20,874	$41,486	$49,041	18,538	7,454
31	Franklin	$20,817	$40,983	$49,597	41,052	16,011
32	Marion	$20,811	$38,785	$46,670	28,237	11,403
33	Coffee	$20,737	$40,078	$50,376	52,796	20,926
34	Henry	$20,687	$36,836	$48,204	32,330	13,604
35	Stewart	$20,670	$40,214	$47,517	13,324	5,386
36	Cumberland	$20,544	$36,813	$42,884	56,053	23,791
37	Unicoi	$20,540	$34,387	$47,145	18,313	7,726
38	Marshall	$20,157	$40,435	$49,185	30,617	11,850
39	Gibson	$20,065	$35,947	$47,843	49,683	19,690
40	Trousdale	$19,996	$44,205	$52,430	7,870	2,976
41	Henderson	$19,988	$38,887	$45,557	27,769	10,306
42	McMinn	$19,796	$37,146	$47,726	52,266	20,865
43	Giles	$19,778	$37,860	$45,642	29,485	11,875
44	Decatur	$19,757	$30,445	$41,948	11,757	4,927
45	Crockett	$19,742	$36,556	$45,294	14,586	5,709
46	Carroll	$19,712	$36,160	$46,211	28,522	11,507
47	Jefferson	$19,680	$38,239	$48,690	51,407	19,864
48	Hawkins	$19,600	$35,392	$42,478	56,833	23,343
49	Putnam	$19,434	$35,185	$46,655	72,321	28,930
50	Pickett	$19,327	$30,193	$41,281	5,077	2,177
51	Dyer	$19,169	$36,856	$44,254	38,335	15,183
52	Benton	$19,114	$33,953	$40,819	16,489	7,063
53	Weakley	$18,895	$32,358	$44,134	35,021	13,898
54	Greene	$18,782	$36,867	$43,644	68,831	28,018
55	Meigs	$18,768	$33,506	$39,767	11,753	4,686
56	Monroe	$18,651	$36,209	$44,984	44,519	17,711
57	Warren	$18,508	$34,946	$43,337	39,839	15,850
58	McNairy	$18,488	$34,777	$41,219	26,075	10,326
59	Bedford	$18,471	$38,550	$46,417	45,058	16,530
60	Hickman	$18,447	$42,075	$49,770	24,690	8,976
61	Clay	$18,367	$32,106	$42,821	7,861	3,358
62	Hardin	$18,122	$30,732	$37,867	26,026	10,643
63	Sequatchie	$18,094	$33,850	$41,808	14,112	5,519
64	Lawrence	$18,086	$34,985	$43,356	41,869	16,275
65	Cannon	$18,076	$38,733	$45,354	13,801	5,472
66	DeKalb	$17,976	$34,863	$44,558	18,723	7,420
67	Morgan	$17,883	$36,772	$45,956	21,987	7,692
68	White	$17,880	$33,865	$40,369	25,841	10,272
69	Houston	$17,791	$33,738	$42,098	8,426	3,349
70	Overton	$17,720	$34,347	$42,007	22,083	8,820
71	Rhea	$17,655	$36,761	$42,682	31,809	12,276
72	Carter	$17,601	$31,173	$39,631	57,424	24,197
73	Polk	$17,481	$34,027	$44,824	16,825	6,653
74	Lewis	$17,473	$35,000	$47,511	12,161	4,781
75	Jackson	$17,452	$32,722	$40,053	11,638	4,789
76	Chester	$17,343	$39,915	$47,798	17,131	6,208
77	Fentress	$17,291	$29,642	$37,689	17,959	7,250
78	Van Buren	$17,160	$29,087	$32,394	5,548	2,246
79	Claiborne	$17,128	$31,353	$40,962	32,213	12,853
80	Haywood	$17,047	$32,414	$40,344	18,787	7,459
81	Perry	$17,028	$31,776	$37,592	7,915	3,160
82	Cocke	$16,957	$28,809	$37,229	35,662	14,788
83	Grainger	$16,783	$30,623	$38,703	22,657	9,029
84	Johnson	$16,638	$29,949	$34,756	18,244	7,195
85	Macon	$16,518	$33,087	$39,648	22,248	8,561
86	Campbell	$16,426	$30,686	$37,013	40,716	16,354
87	Union	$16,155	$30,143	$38,919	19,109	7,391
88	Lauderdale	$16,006	$32,894	$37,554	27,815	9,795
89	Hardeman	$15,838	$32,539	$43,057	27,253	9,301
90	Wayne	$15,814	$34,993	$45,098	17,021	6,136
91	Scott	$15,087	$28,728	$39,988	22,228	8,671
92	Grundy	$14,000	$26,529	$33,151	13,703	5,405
93	Hancock	$13,717	$23,125	$31,495	6,819	2,825
94	Bledsoe	$12,907	$29,729	$36,077	12,876	4,697
95	Lake	$11,813	$24,700	$36,479	7,832	2,270

== Tennessee counties ranked by median income ==
Note: Data is from the 2020 United States Census and the 2016–2020 American Community Survey 5-Year Estimates.

Rank	County	Median household income	Mean household income
1	Williamson	$111,196	$149,051
2	Wilson	$78,962	$99,095
3	Sumner	$69,878	$90,612
4	Rutherford	$68,718	$85,132
5	Robertson	$66,088	$81,857
6	Cheatham	$63,988	$76,610
7	Moore	$63,762	$75,772
8	Fayette	$63,618	$86,784
9	Davidson	$62,515	$89,045
10	Tipton	$62,474	$77,232
11	Loudon	$61,664	$83,912
12	Montgomery	$60,878	$74,548
13	Maury	$60,567	$75,743
14	Blount	$60,301	$77,451
15	Knox	$59,250	$83,142
16	Dickson	$57,804	$75,015
17	Trousdale	$56,981	$65,182
18	Hamilton	$56,606	$82,225
19	Roane	$55,578	$77,128
20	Marshall	$55,299	$68,185
21	Lincoln	$53,923	$70,572
22	Chester	$53,336	$60,399
23	Bedford	$52,973	$71,947
24	Cannon	$52,518	$65,868
25	Anderson	$52,338	$69,652
26	Shelby	$52,092	$78,897
27	Jefferson	$51,899	$67,357
28	Bradley	$51,872	$67,769
29	Sevier	$51,734	$68,149
30	Coffee	$51,030	$66,065
31	Meigs	$50,733	$59,534
32	Marion	$50,059	$63,307
33	Giles	$49,815	$64,327
34	Stewart	$49,537	$62,454
35	Cumberland	$49,423	$61,033
36	Bledsoe	$49,382	$62,227
37	Washington	$48,923	$69,411
38	Perry	$48,716	$71,349
39	Smith	$48,611	$74,151
40	Humphreys	$48,411	$62,620
41	Madison	$48,396	$65,348
42	Franklin	$47,777	$69,022
43	Crockett	$47,581	$61,300
44	Van Buren	$47,576	$56,789
45	Hickman	$47,457	$73,071
46	Sullivan	$47,438	$67,009
47	McMinn	$46,872	$63,007
48	Rhea	$46,096	$61,694
49	Monroe	$45,576	$58,603
50	Gibson	$45,557	$58,772
51	Polk	$45,326	$66,271
52	Hawkins	$45,318	$59,997
53	Putnam	$45,160	$61,582
54	Union	$45,143	$61,952
55	Dyer	$45,042	$70,060
56	Grainger	$44,703	$58,929
57	Henderson	$44,534	$57,450
58	Unicoi	$44,526	$53,485
59	DeKalb	$44,389	$62,119
60	White	$44,282	$59,630
61	Sequatchie	$44,217	$58,397
62	Lawrence	$43,734	$58,722
63	Houston	$43,521	$59,969
64	Hamblen	$43,151	$58,965
65	Greene	$43,150	$60,468
66	Pickett	$43,125	$58,199
67	Grundy	$43,116	$53,971
68	Carroll	$42,877	$58,056
69	Warren	$42,668	$58,710
70	Hardin	$42,285	$59,777
71	Wayne	$42,206	$57,477
72	Lauderdale	$41,905	$53,866
73	Campbell	$41,769	$57,516
74	Morgan	$41,701	$56,412
75	Weakley	$41,488	$55,161
76	Henry	$41,037	$58,142
77	Carter	$40,820	$55,478
78	Decatur	$40,389	$58,668
79	McNairy	$40,327	$54,136
80	Fentress	$40,203	$47,422
81	Obion	$39,985	$53,667
82	Hardeman	$39,636	$51,474
83	Benton	$39,019	$54,137
84	Haywood	$38,994	$54,029
85	Cocke	$38,530	$51,652
86	Johnson	$38,090	$56,952
87	Macon	$38,080	$59,385
88	Claiborne	$37,954	$52,778
89	Scott	$37,135	$48,573
90	Lewis	$36,977	$53,077
91	Overton	$36,478	$53,700
92	Jackson	$35,880	$50,212
93	Lake	$34,230	$57,129
94	Clay	$32,064	$48,517
95	Hancock	$28,234	$55,123

== See also ==
- United States counties by per capita income
- List of highest-income counties in the United States
- List of lowest-income counties in the United States
