= List of Ohio locations by per capita income =

Ohio is the twenty-second-wealthiest state in the United States of America, with a per capita income of $21,003 (2000).

== Ohio counties ranked by per capita income ==
Note: Data is from the 2010 United States Census Data and the 2006-2010 American Community Survey 5-Year Estimates.

	County	Per capita income	Median household income	Median family income	Population	Number of households
1	Delaware	$42,069	$66,669	$76,453	142,214	62,760
2	Geauga	$32,735	$65,663	$76,780	93,389	34,264
3	Warren	$31,935	$71,274	$82,090	212,693	76,424
4	Medina	$29,986	$66,193	$76,699	172,332	65,143
5	Hamilton	$28,799	$48,234	$64,683	802,374	333,945
6	Greene	$28,328	$56,679	$70,817	161,573	62,770
7	Lake	$28,221	$54,896	$67,206	230,041	94,156
8	Clermont	$27,900	$58,472	$68,485	197,363	74,828
9	Ottawa	$27,809	$53,463	$64,258	41,428	17,503
10	Union	$27,389	$68,452	$78,254	52,300	18,065
	United States	$27,334	$51,914	$62,982	308,745,538	116,716,292
11	Franklin	$26,909	$49,087	$62,372	1,163,414	477,235
12	Summit	$26,676	$47,926	$62,271	541,781	222,781
13	Wood	$26,671	$53,298	$69,768	125,488	49,043
14	Cuyahoga	$26,263	$43,603	$58,064	1,280,122	545,056
15	Fairfield	$26,130	$56,796	$65,835	146,156	54,310
16	Butler	$25,892	$54,788	$68,539	368,130	135,960
17	Licking	$25,534	$53,291	$64,386	166,492	63,989
18	Auglaize	$25,290	$52,018	$60,318	45,949	17,972
19	Erie	$25,290	$46,593	$61,247	77,079	31,860
20	Hancock	$25,158	$49,070	$59,600	74,782	30,197
	Ohio	$25,113	$47,358	$59,680	11,536,504	4,603,435
21	Portage	$25,097	$50,447	$65,306	161,419	62,222
22	Miami	$25,006	$51,507	$61,190	102,506	40,917
23	Lorain	$25,002	$52,066	$62,082	301,356	116,274
24	Montgomery	$24,828	$43,965	$56,559	535,153	223,943
25	Putnam	$24,023	$56,573	$65,882	34,499	12,872
26	Stark	$24,015	$44,941	$55,976	375,586	151,089
27	Lucas	$23,981	$42,072	$54,855	441,815	180,267
28	Madison	$23,980	$50,533	$63,397	43,435	14,734
29	Champaign	$23,438	$49,246	$58,433	40,097	15,329
30	Preble	$23,290	$49,780	$57,711	42,270	16,341
31	Logan	$22,974	$46,493	$53,601	45,858	18,111
32	Mahoning	$22,824	$40,123	$52,489	238,823	98,712
33	Fulton	$22,804	$50,717	$59,090	42,698	16,188
34	Washington	$22,786	$41,654	$53,131	61,778	25,587
35	Wayne	$22,645	$48,375	$59,692	114,520	42,638
36	Henry	$22,638	$48,367	$58,587	28,215	10,934
37	Wyandot	$22,553	$47,216	$57,461	22,615	9,091
38	Mercer	$22,348	$49,719	$60,215	40,814	15,532
39	Sandusky	$22,286	$48,056	$57,500	60,944	24,182
40	Clinton	$22,163	$46,261	$56,208	42,040	16,210
41	Defiance	$22,139	$44,480	$54,472	39,037	15,268
42	Clark	$22,110	$44,141	$53,678	138,333	55,244
43	Shelby	$21,948	$48,475	$58,473	49,423	18,467
44	Trumbull	$21,854	$42,296	$52,731	210,312	86,011
45	Huron	$21,743	$47,058	$53,887	59,626	22,820
46	Allen	$21,713	$43,632	$55,549	106,331	40,619
47	Carroll	$21,575	$43,148	$51,700	28,836	11,385
48	Darke	$21,483	$44,280	$53,454	52,959	20,929
49	Richland	$21,459	$42,664	$54,637	124,475	48,921
50	Pickaway	$21,432	$49,262	$58,811	55,698	19,624
51	Williams	$21,381	$44,538	$52,975	37,642	15,075
52	Knox	$21,204	$45,655	$55,881	60,921	22,607
53	Seneca	$20,976	$42,573	$51,216	56,745	21,774
54	Paulding	$20,919	$46,459	$56,170	19,614	7,769
55	Morrow	$20,795	$49,891	$55,980	34,827	12,855
56	Van Wert	$20,772	$44,415	$51,215	28,744	11,439
57	Ross	$20,595	$42,626	$50,081	78,064	28,919
58	Crawford	$20,590	$41,228	$49,647	43,784	18,099
59	Muskingum	$20,561	$39,538	$48,425	86,074	34,271
60	Ashland	$20,558	$44,542	$54,177	53,139	20,196
61	Tuscarawas	$20,536	$42,081	$51,330	92,582	36,965
62	Fayette	$20,525	$39,599	$48,424	29,030	11,436
63	Jefferson	$20,470	$37,527	$47,901	69,709	29,109
64	Belmont	$20,266	$38,320	$47,214	70,400	28,679
65	Gallia	$20,199	$37,409	$46,470	30,934	12,062
66	Brown	$20,167	$45,887	$54,184	44,846	17,014
67	Noble	$20,029	$39,500	$44,773	14,645	4,852
68	Ashtabula	$19,898	$42,139	$50,227	101,497	39,363
69	Marion	$19,849	$40,511	$50,900	66,501	24,691
70	Columbiana	$19,635	$39,502	$48,948	107,841	42,683
71	Coshocton	$19,635	$39,469	$47,931	36,901	14,658
72	Lawrence	$19,452	$36,461	$46,732	62,450	24,974
73	Harrison	$19,318	$35,363	$44,325	15,864	6,526
74	Guernsey	$19,187	$37,573	$48,445	40,087	16,210
75	Hardin	$19,100	$41,343	$55,274	32,058	11,762
76	Hocking	$19,048	$39,586	$48,796	29,380	11,369
77	Highland	$18,966	$39,844	$48,604	43,589	16,693
78	Perry	$18,916	$42,388	$50,489	36,058	13,576
79	Morgan	$18,777	$34,962	$40,440	15,054	6,034
80	Jackson	$18,775	$34,044	$42,560	33,225	13,010
81	Monroe	$18,738	$37,030	$43,261	14,642	6,065
82	Meigs	$18,003	$33,407	$42,653	23,770	9,557
83	Scioto	$17,778	$32,812	$44,122	79,499	30,870
84	Adams	$17,693	$32,791	$40,305	28,550	11,147
85	Pike	$17,494	$35,912	$43,010	28,709	11,012
86	Holmes	$17,009	$43,533	$49,133	42,366	12,554
87	Vinton	$16,736	$34,242	$37,409	13,435	5,260
88	Athens	$16,642	$31,559	$48,170	64,757	23,578

== See also ==
- Economy of Ohio
