= List of Utah locations by per capita income =

Utah has the eleventh lowest per capita income in the United States of America, at $18,185 (2000). Its personal per capita income is $24,977 (2003).

== Utah counties ranked by per capita income ==
Note: Data is from the 2010 United States Census Data and the 2006-2010 American Community Survey 5-Year Estimates.

Rank	County	Per capita income	Median household income	Median family income	Population	Number of households
1	Summit	$40,270	$79,461	$91,286	36,324	12,990
	United States	$27,334	$51,914	$62,982	308,745,538	116,716,292
2	Wasatch	$26,873	$65,204	$68,892	23,530	7,287
3	Rich	$25,376	$54,737	$55,545	2,264	805
4	Davis	$25,244	$66,866	$73,259	306,479	93,545
5	Kane	$25,155	$43,540	$48,853	7,125	2,900
6	Salt Lake	$25,041	$58,004	$67,451	1,029,655	342,622
7	Morgan	$24,276	$70,152	$77,429	9,469	2,820
8	Uintah	$24,160	$59,730	$65,516	32,588	10,563
9	Garfield	$23,187	$44,745	$57,351	5,172	1,930
	Utah	$23,139	$56,330	$64,013	2,763,885	877,692
10	Daggett	$22,862	$36,389	$60,938	1,059	426
11	Weber	$22,849	$54,086	$61,300	231,236	78,748
12	Tooele	$22,020	$60,590	$65,618	58,218	17,971
13	Duchesne	$21,787	$52,895	$58,364	18,607	6,003
14	Washington	$21,378	$50,050	$54,315	138,115	46,334
15	Grand	$20,611	$41,396	$53,291	9,225	3,889
16	Box Elder	$20,465	$55,135	$60,518	49,975	16,058
17	Carbon	$20,260	$41,967	$52,106	21,403	7,978
18	Utah	$20,210	$56,927	$62,938	516,564	140,602
19	Emery	$19,968	$49,237	$58,086	10,976	3,732
20	Wayne	$19,829	$49,414	$52,500	2,778	1,059
21	Cache	$19,670	$47,013	$55,136	112,656	34,722
22	Sevier	$18,856	$45,622	$51,860	20,802	7,094
23	Millard	$18,839	$44,594	$53,735	12,503	4,201
24	Juab	$18,193	$53,225	$55,910	10,246	3,093
25	Iron	$16,898	$42,247	$46,665	46,163	15,022
26	Piute	$16,140	$37,708	$48,438	1,556	576
27	Beaver	$16,131	$41,514	$46,426	6,629	2,265
28	Sanpete	$15,731	$42,395	$48,952	27,822	7,952
29	San Juan	$15,150	$38,076	$45,653	14,746	4,505

== See also ==
- List of municipalities in Utah
