= List of Pennsylvania counties by per capita income =

Pennsylvania has the 19th-highest per capita income in the nation at $35,804 annually and the 21st-highest median household income at $68,957 as of 2021.

== Wealthiest counties ==
The wealthiest regions of Pennsylvania are the suburban counties bordering Philadelphia, the state's most populous city. As of 2020, the wealthiest county in Pennsylvania is Chester County with a $104,161 median household income followed by Montgomery County ($93,518) and Bucks County ($93,181).

While there are wealthy locations in the suburbs of other cities, they tend to be more condensend into small locations.

== Philadelphia Main Line ==
One area known for its historic wealth is the Philadelphia Main Line, which includes Lower Merion, Radnor, Tredyffrin, Easttown, and Willistown townships. Some of Pennsylvania's most affluent neighborhoods and priciest real estate are located in communities located in these townships, including Ardmore, Bala Cynwyd, Gladwyne, Haverford, and Villanova. Chestnut Hill is another wealthy area, however no census data exists for it (except for zip code data), because it is part of Philadelphia. The Northeast wealth corridor also runs through Montgomery County, highest in the area of Whitpain, Lower Gwynedd, Plymouth, Upper Dublin and Whitemarsh townships; and into areas of Bucks County especially the area around New Hope, such as Solebury, Lower Makefield, and Upper Makefield townships.

== Other Pennsylvania locations ==
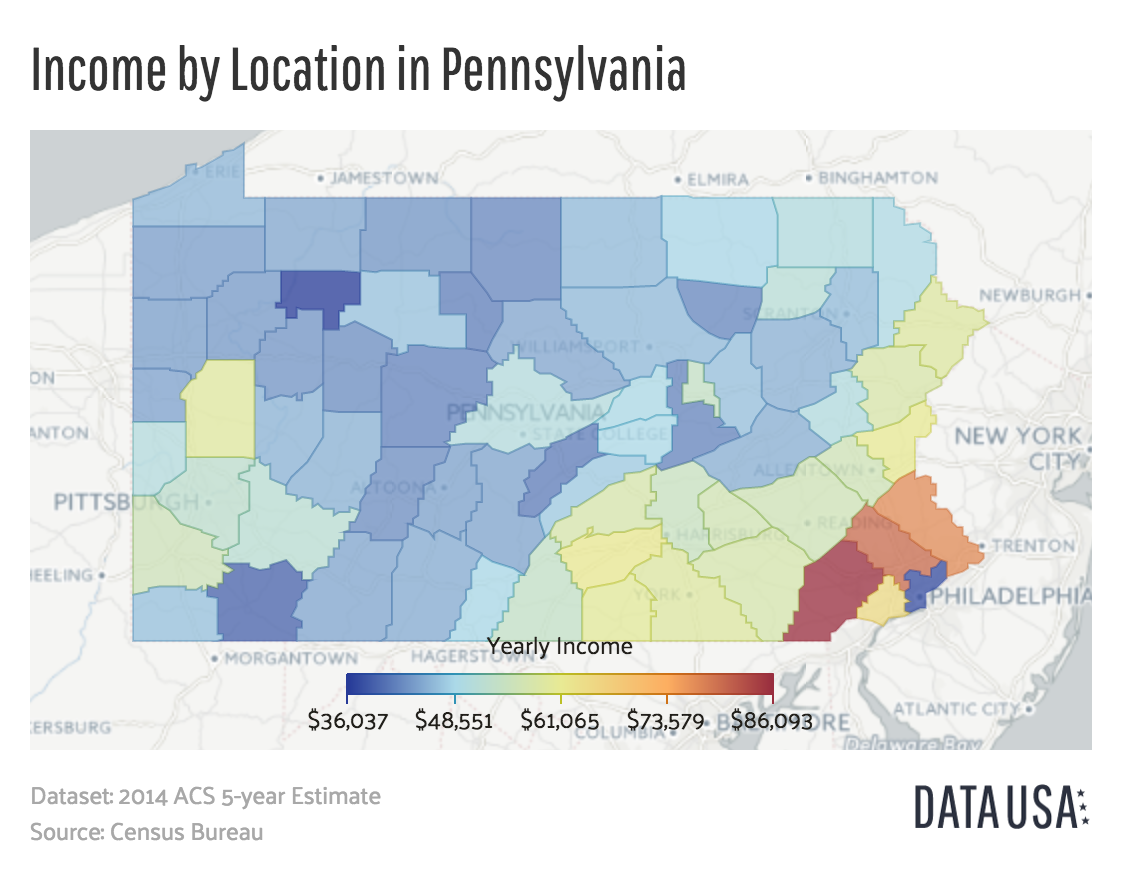
Map of average income by location in Pennsylvania from the 2014 American Community Survey five-year estimate

Outside of the Philadelphia, Pittsburgh, and Harrisburg metropolitan areas, Pennsylvania is a relatively poorer state, especially in the northern areas and the Appalachian Mountains; only 22% of Pennsylvania places have per capita incomes higher than the national per capita income, and 11.0% of the population lives below the poverty line.

Among Pennsylvania households, 1.9% have annual incomes exceeding $200,000 annually, and 10.3% have incomes of $100,000 or more annually. In the state, 9.7% have incomes less than $10,000, and 43.8% have incomes less than $34,999.

== Pennsylvania counties ranked by per capita income ==
Note: Data is from the 2010 United States Census Data and the 2006-2010 American Community Survey 5-Year Estimates.

Rank	County	Per capita income	Median household income	Median family income	Population	Number of households
*	United States	$27,334	$51,914	$62,982	308,745,538	116,716,292
*	Pennsylvania	$27,049	$50,398	$63,364	12,702,379	5,018,904
1	Chester	$41,251	$84,741	$94,592	498,886	307,750
2	Montgomery	$40,076	$76,380	$94,592	799,874	
3	Bucks	$35,687	$74,828	$90,274	625,249	234,849
4	Delaware	$32,067	$61,876	$77,879	558,979	208,700
5	Cumberland	$30,119	$60,219	$75,000	235,406	93,943
6	Allegheny	$29,549	$47,961	$65,678	1,223,348	533,960
7	Butler	$28,446	$56,878	$69,464	183,862	72,835
8	Northampton	$28,362	$58,762	$70,457	297,735	113,565
9	Dauphin	$27,727	$52,371	$66,023	268,100	110,435
10	Pike	$27,564	$56,843	$62,982	57,369	21,925
11	Lehigh	$27,301	$53,541	$66,004	349,497	133,983
12	York	$27,196	$57,494	$67,624	434,972	168,372
13	Montour	$26,124	$45,255	$57,011	18,267	7,393
14	Washington	$26,045	$49,687	$63,690	207,820	85,089
15	Lancaster	$25,854	$54,765	$64,672	519,445	193,602
16	Westmoreland	$25,845	$47,689	$60,987	365,169	153,650
17	Adams	$25,606	$56,529	$66,222	101,407	38,013
18	Lebanon	$25,525	$52,356	$62,174	133,568	52,258
19	Berks	$25,518	$53,470	$63,724	411,442	154,356
20	Franklin	$25,307	$51,035	$61,410	149,618	58,389
21	Monroe	$24,824	$56,733	$64,763	169,842	61,091
22	Beaver	$24,168	$46,190	$57,201	170,539	71,383
23	Lackawanna	$24,152	$43,673	$57,846	214,437	87,226
24	Centre	$23,744	$47,016	$65,121	153,990	57,573
25	Perry	$23,701	$52,659	$61,221	45,969	17,903
26	Luzerne	$23,245	$42,224	$54,843	320,918	131,932
27	Carbon	$22,956	$47,744	$54,918	65,249	26,684
28	Wyoming	$22,899	$47,403	$56,957	28,276	11,237
29	Blair	$22,880	$42,363	$53,166	127,089	52,159
30	Elk	$22,729	$43,745	$51,889	31,946	13,693
31	Erie	$22,644	$43,595	$56,144	280,566	110,413
32	Wayne	$22,525	$45,930	$53,665	52,822	20,625
33	Columbia	$22,403	$42,788	$52,959	67,295	26,479
34	Susquehanna	$22,173	$43,457	$51,151	43,356	17,798
35	Warren	$22,170	$41,286	$52,587	41,815	17,767
36	Armstrong	$21,828	$42,752	$52,085	68,941	28,713
37	Lycoming	$21,802	$42,689	$52,124	116,111	46,700
38	Mercer	$21,765	$42,573	$54,160	116,638	46,442
39	Fulton	$21,739	$45,240	$54,946	14,845	6,014
40	Union	$21,612	$45,474	$52,664	44,947	14,765
41	Lawrence	$21,467	$42,570	$52,370	91,108	37,126
42	Schuylkill	$21,408	$42,315	$53,083	148,289	60,192
43	Cameron	$21,375	$40,733	$49,922	5,085	2,273
44	Cambria	$21,278	$39,574	$50,900	143,679	58,950
45	Philadelphia	$21,117	$36,251	$45,619	1,526,006	599,736
46	Snyder	$21,072	$44,713	$51,715	39,702	14,750
47	McKean	$21,022	$40,097	$50,000	43,450	17,183
48	Bradford	$20,979	$40,543	$50,142	62,622	25,321
49	Juniata	$20,682	$44,276	$52,489	24,636	9,476
50	Northumberland	$20,654	$38,387	$48,708	94,528	39,242
51	Huntingdon	$20,616	$41,700	$51,969	45,913	17,280
52	Potter	$20,594	$39,196	$47,995	17,457	7,227
53	Indiana	$20,587	$40,225	$51,227	88,880	35,005
54	Bedford	$20,545	$40,249	$48,825	49,762	20,233
55	Venango	$20,522	$39,812	$48,866	54,984	22,621
56	Crawford	$20,383	$38,924	$48,557	88,765	35,028
57	Tioga	$20,358	$40,338	$48,382	41,981	16,727
58	Jefferson	$20,305	$38,406	$47,051	45,200	18,561
59	Clarion	$20,259	$40,028	$50,697	39,988	16,128
60	Greene	$20,258	$40,498	$49,488	38,686	14,724
61	Clearfield	$20,142	$37,130	$46,735	81,642	32,288
62	Somerset	$19,903	$39,194	$48,994	77,742	31,090
63	Sullivan	$19,718	$36,250	$48,168	6,428	2,777
64	Clinton	$19,261	$39,354	$50,055	39,238	15,151
65	Fayette	$19,209	$34,796	$44,114	136,606	55,997
66	Mifflin	$19,085	$37,539	$46,598	46,682	18,743
67	Forest	$14,325	$35,150	$43,750	7,716	2,511

== See also ==
- Pennsylvania

== Sources ==
- U.S.Gov't Census Bureau Table P82 - Per Capita Income
