= List of Alabama locations by per capita income =

Alabama has a per capita income of $28,934 (2020). Its median household income is $52,035 (2020), with 16.1% of Alabama residents living in poverty.

== Alabama counties ranked by per capita income ==
Data is from the 2020 United States census.

Rank	County	Per capita income	Median household income	Poverty rate
1	Shelby	$39,711	$78,889	7.0%
2	Madison	$38,192	$66,887	10.5%
3	Baldwin	$33,751	$61,756	8.9%
4	Jefferson	$33,343	$55,088	14.4%
5	Washington	$30,391	$42,331	17.5%
6	Autauga	$29,804	$57,982	11.2%
7	Elmore	$29,585	$62,324	11.5%
8	Montgomery	$29,543	$51,963	20.4%
9	Lee	$28,804	$52,930	17.9%
10	Limestone	$28,695	$64,270	10.4%
11	Lauderdale	$28,540	$48,428	13.9%
12	Morgan	$28,474	$52,923	14.4%
13	Marengo	$27,975	$33,029	18.3%
14	St. Clair	$27,941	$62,531	10.5%
15	Coffee	$27,912	$56,799	13.9%
16	Houston	$27,794	$49,069	14.8%
17	Tuscaloosa	$27,609	$54,283	14.4%
18	Mobile	$26,778	$49,625	17.6%
19	Crenshaw	$26,351	$42,611	16.8%
20	Calhoun	$26,238	$50,128	14.5%
21	Cherokee	$26,231	$42,509	14.7%
22	Henry	$26,011	$51,715	16.2%
23	Chilton	$25,894	$52,141	13.9%
24	Marshall	$25,861	$50,216	15.4%
25	Colbert	$25,807	$47,962	14.4%
26	Tallapoosa	$25,640	$48,160	15.2%
27	Blount	$25,457	$48,922	13.1%
28	Clay	$25,337	$42,678	14.2%
29	Walker	$25,330	$45,833	16.4%
30	Covington	$25,303	$42,566	17.1%
31	Etowah	$25,094	$44,934	15.6%
32	Coosa	$25,083	$43,571	17.4%
33	Lawrence	$24,779	$47,125	15.4%
34	Cullman	$24,770	$48,388	12.5%
35	Randolph	$24,744	$45,141	17.5%
36	Cleburne	$24,723	$46,320	14.2%
37	Clarke	$24,574	$37,345	19.5%
38	Dale	$24,473	$45,644	15.5%
39	Russell	$24,300	$42,208	20.3%
40	Talladega	$24,244	$43,969	16.9%
41	Chambers	$24,088	$43,875	16.3%
42	Jackson	$23,844	$42,578	15.3%
43	Pike	$23,784	$39,218	19.7%
44	Pickens	$23,476	$40,362	22.7%
45	Butler	$23,415	$44,850	20.6%
46	Fayette	$23,389	$41,469	16.5%
47	Choctaw	$23,292	$36,634	20.4%
48	Winston	$23,269	$40,991	17.4%
49	Bibb	$22,626	$51,721	17.8%
50	DeKalb	$22,511	$42,267	15.2%
51	Marion	$22,486	$40,978	16.8%
52	Geneva	$22,415	$41,569	21.0%
53	Lamar	$22,229	$42,688	17.4%
54	Macon	$22,170	$35,450	27.9%
55	Monroe	$21,885	$31,969	22.5%
56	Franklin	$21,503	$41,174	17.2%
57	Lowndes	$21,298	$33,634	21.9%
58	Bullock	$20,783	$33,866	30.8%
59	Conecuh	$20,756	$35,444	22.9%
60	Hale	$20,652	$30,793	21.9%
61	Barbour	$20,074	$34,990	25.5%
62	Dallas	$19,653	$33,317	26.7%
63	Wilcox	$19,031	$35,063	22.2%
64	Escambia	$18,587	$35,558	20.4%
65	Sumter	$16,977	$26,150	29.2%
66	Greene	$16,425	$26,688	27.9%
67	Perry	$13,833	$23,875	30.7%
