= List of Indiana locations by per capita income =

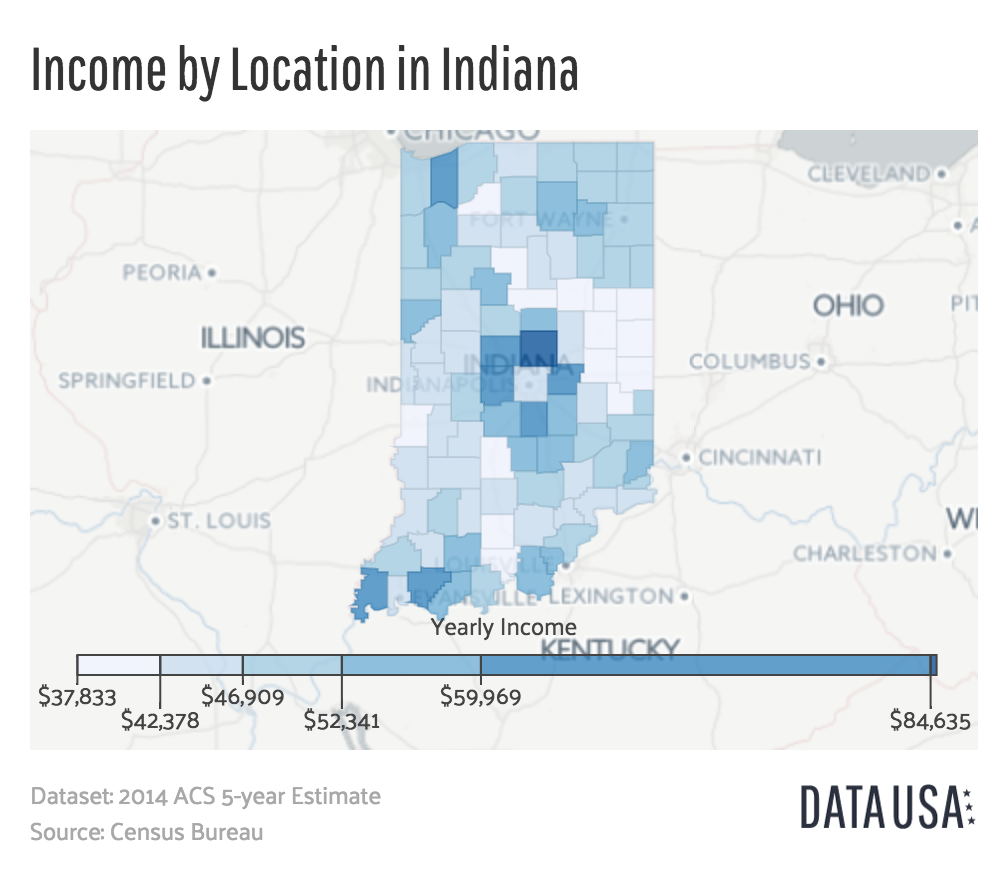
Note: Map data from 2014 ACS 5-year Estimate report published by the US Census Bureau

Indiana has the twenty-seventh highest per capita income in the United States of America, at $20,397 (2000). Its personal per capita income is $28,783 (2003).

== Indiana counties ranked by per capita income ==
Note: Table data is from the 2010 United States Census Data and the 2006-2010 American Community Survey 5-Year Estimates.

Rank	County	Per capita income	Median household income	Median family income	Population	Number of households
1	Boone	$38,696	$68,594	$81,401	56,640	21,149
2	Hamilton	$38,500	$81,947	$95,376	274,569	99,835
3	Warrick	$29,737	$62,354	$73,583	59,689	22,505
4	Hendricks	$28,880	$67,180	$77,397	145,448	52,368
5	Johnson	$28,224	$61,629	$72,723	139,654	52,242
6	Hancock	$28,017	$69,052	$69,734	70,002	26,304
7	Porter	$27,922	$60,889	$73,065	164,343	61,998
	United States	$27,334	$51,914	$62,982	308,745,538	116,716,292
8	Bartholomew	$26,860	$52,742	$64,024	76,794	29,860
9	Posey	$26,727	$57,530	$68,722	25,910	10,171
10	Shelby	$26,398	$52,292	$60,824	44,436	17,302
11	Floyd	$25,971	$52,422	$63,139	74,578	29,479
12	Ohio	$25,703	$50,966	$64,271	6,128	2,477
13	Dearborn	$25,023	$56,789	$66,561	50,047	18,743
14	Dubois	$24,801	$52,871	$64,286	41,889	16,133
15	Whitley	$24,644	$52,129	$63,487	33,292	13,001
16	Allen	$24,532	$48,714	$60,184	355,329	137,851
17	Marion	$24,498	$43,541	$54,142	903,393	366,176
18	Brown	$24,312	$50,139	$56,911	15,242	6,199
	Indiana	$24,058	$47,697	$58,944	6,483,802	2,502,154
19	Newton	$24,055	$50,721	$60,242	14,244	5,503
20	Kosciusko	$24,019	$50,217	$56,305	77,358	29,197
21	Morgan	$23,972	$55,427	$62,507	68,894	25,765
22	Vanderburgh	$23,945	$42,396	$57,076	179,703	74,454
23	Howard	$23,759	$45,003	$55,479	82,752	34,301
24	Jasper	$23,676	$55,093	$63,842	33,478	12,232
25	Warren	$23,670	$49,238	$57,990	8,508	3,337
26	Spencer	$23,609	$52,105	$61,365	20,952	8,082
27	Clark	$23,592	$47,368	$58,090	110,232	44,248
28	Harrison	$23,539	$51,272	$59,316	39,364	15,192
29	Tipton	$23,499	$51,485	$61,115	15,936	6,376
30	Wells	$23,169	$47,202	$56,885	27,636	10,780
31	Carroll	$23,163	$48,055	$60,420	20,155	7,900
32	Lake	$23,142	$48,723	$58,931	496,005	188,157
33	Franklin	$23,090	$51,649	$60,300	23,087	8,579
34	St. Joseph	$23,082	$44,644	$57,510	266,931	103,069
35	Steuben	$22,950	$47,479	$57,154	34,185	13,310
36	Montgomery	$22,788	$47,694	$56,374	38,124	14,979
37	Decatur	$22,719	$46,894	$52,308	25,740	9,977
38	LaPorte	$22,599	$46,014	$56,679	111,467	42,331
39	Gibson	$22,542	$46,872	$61,652	33,503	13,255
40	Marshall	$22,493	$50,141	$58,017	47,051	17,406
41	White	$22,323	$45,891	$52,626	24,643	9,741
42	Tippecanoe	$22,203	$42,632	$60,367	172,780	65,532
43	Elkhart	$22,187	$47,258	$53,742	197,559	70,244
44	Vermilion	$22,178	$41,904	$50,743	16,212	6,619
45	Ripley	$22,025	$48,093	$57,305	28,818	10,789
46	Benton	$21,949	$46,318	$58,661	8,854	3,479
47	Monroe	$21,882	$38,137	$60,845	137,974	54,864
48	Wayne	$21,789	$41,123	$51,155	68,917	27,551
49	Blackford	$21,783	$41,989	$47,287	12,766	5,236
50	DeKalb	$21,779	$46,722	$55,280	42,223	15,951
51	Martin	$21,750	$43,406	$55,017	10,334	4,216
52	Madison	$21,722	$43,256	$53,906	131,636	51,927
53	Huntington	$21,575	$45,964	$55,630	37,124	14,218
54	Jackson	$21,498	$43,980	$53,534	42,376	16,501
55	Lawrence	$21,352	$40,380	$50,355	46,134	18,811
56	Jefferson	$21,278	$42,707	$52,343	32,428	12,635
57	Rush	$21,215	$46,685	$52,874	17,392	6,767
58	Switzerland	$21,214	$44,503	$51,769	10,613	4,034
59	Clinton	$21,131	$48,416	$57,445	33,224	12,105
60	Fulton	$21,119	$40,372	$47,972	20,836	8,237
61	Fountain	$20,949	$42,817	$51,696	17,240	6,935
62	Perry	$20,806	$45,108	$55,497	19,338	7,476
63	Greene	$20,676	$41,103	$50,740	33,165	13,487
64	Owen	$20,581	$44,285	$52,343	21,575	8,486
65	Clay	$20,569	$44,666	$52,907	26,890	10,447
66	Cass	$20,562	$42,587	$49,873	38,966	14,858
67	Pulaski	$20,491	$44,016	$50,903	13,402	5,282
68	Wabash	$20,475	$43,157	$52,758	32,888	12,777
69	Putnam	$20,441	$48,992	$59,354	37,963	12,917
70	Delaware	$20,405	$38,066	$51,394	117,671	46,516
71	Vigo	$20,398	$38,508	$50,413	107,848	41,361
72	Knox	$20,381	$39,523	$51,534	38,440	15,249
73	Daviess	$20,254	$44,592	$53,769	31,648	11,329
74	Sullivan	$20,093	$44,184	$52,558	21,475	7,823
75	Pike	$20,005	$41,222	$49,423	12,845	5,186
76	Henry	$19,879	$41,087	$52,701	49,462	19,077
77	Grant	$19,792	$38,985	$49,860	70,061	27,245
78	Noble	$19,783	$45,818	$53,959	47,536	17,355
79	Randolph	$19,552	$40,990	$45,543	26,171	10,451
80	Parke	$19,494	$40,512	$51,581	17,339	6,222
81	Scott	$19,414	$39,588	$46,775	24,181	9,397
82	Washington	$19,278	$39,722	$45,500	28,262	10,850
83	Union	$19,243	$43,257	$49,815	7,516	2,938
84	Orange	$19,119	$37,120	$45,874	19,840	7,872
85	Adams	$19,089	$43,317	$53,106	34,387	12,011
86	Jay	$18,946	$39,886	$47,926	21,253	8,133
87	Fayette	$18,928	$37,038	$46,601	24,277	9,719
88	Miami	$18,854	$39,485	$49,282	36,903	13,456
89	Jennings	$18,636	$43,755	$48,470	28,525	10,680
90	Crawford	$18,598	$37,988	$46,073	10,713	4,303
91	LaGrange	$18,388	$47,792	$53,793	37,128	11,598
92	Starke	$17,991	$37,480	$44,044	23,363	9,038
