= List of West Virginia locations by per capita income =

West Virginia is the third poorest state in the United States of America, with a per capita income of $23,450 (2015).

== West Virginia counties ranked by per capita income ==
Note: County Data is from the 2011–2015 American Community Survey 5-Year Estimates.

Rank	County	Per capita income	Median household income	Median family income	Population	Number of households
1	Jefferson	$30,912	$66,677	$79,830	55,214	20,331
2	Putnam	$29,412	$56,774	$67,353	56,596	21,707
	United States	$28,930	$53,889	$66,011	316,515,021	116,926,305
3	Kanawha	$27,642	$45,882	$57,069	190,781	82,250
4	Ohio	$27,053	$40,569	$60,247	43,637	18,408
5	Berkeley	$26,469	$55,239	$63,304	108,724	40,991
6	Monongalia	$26,314	$45,467	$68,691	101,668	37,035
7	Harrison	$24,415	$43,987	$58,008	68,998	27,502
8	Wood	$24,364	$41,884	$51,984	86,559	36,192
9	Cabell	$23,908	$38,344	$54,671	96,824	39,973
10	Hancock	$23,845	$39,959	$51,407	30,201	12,894
11	Brooke	$23,819	$46,215	$58,460	23,665	10,030
12	Marion	$23,807	$43,165	$54,437	56,790	22,481
13	Marshall	$23,543	$45,182	$54,659	32,480	13,569
14	Morgan	$23,456	$39,324	$53,838	17,475	7,348
	West Virginia	$23,450	$41,751	$52,866	1,851,420	740,890
15	Nicholas	$23,404	$39,171	$48,821	25,930	10,757
16	Pleasants	$23,291	$44,288	$52,833	7,636	2,893
17	Jackson	$23,090	$41,314	$56,384	29,256	11,118
18	Taylor	$22,799	$43,970	$50,920	16,977	6,732
19	Raleigh	$22,405	$41,032	$49,881	78,493	31,274
20	Greenbrier	$22,340	$39,746	$48,287	35,666	15,339
21	Tucker	$22,321	$40,533	$51,500	6,972	3,010
22	Hardy	$22,195	$40,303	$46,422	13,936	5,156
23	Wirt	$22,125	$39,352	$44,929	5,841	2,430
24	Pendleton	$21,979	$36,953	$46,091	7,402	3,095
25	Pocahontas	$21,847	$36,827	$51,109	8,697	3,737
26	Wetzel	$21,619	$39,096	$48,724	16,157	6,525
27	Boone	$21,387	$39,958	$50,777	24,000	9,547
28	Randolph	$21,139	$39,457	$49,520	29,365	11,563
29	Preston	$21,097	$45,064	$54,931	33,809	12,472
30	Lewis	$21,067	$37,849	$45,766	16,434	6,526
31	Tyler	$21,018	$38,854	$51,823	9,033	3,616
32	Mercer	$20,942	$36,195	$46,227	61,891	25,451
33	Monroe	$20,678	$36,918	$43,629	13,525	5,822
34	Logan	$20,477	$36,763	$46,928	35,760	14,043
35	Mingo	$20,417	$33,221	$44,384	25,931	10,844
36	Summers	$20,347	$36,651	$46,814	13,544	5,584
37	Upshur	$20,230	$40,330	$50,007	24,560	9,093
38	Grant	$20,052	$39,088	$48,133	11,815	4,175
39	Doddridge	$19,992	$39,974	$51,212	8,201	2,674
40	Wayne	$19,867	$36,318	$46,827	41,499	16,691
41	Mason	$19,694	$36,448	$45,474	27,177	10,838
42	Calhoun	$19,635	$35,568	$45,519	7,557	3,090
43	Ritchie	$19,632	$37,636	$49,943	10,140	3,942
44	Braxton	$19,409	$32,750	$47,583	14,466	5,607
45	Fayette	$19,232	$36,293	$43,721	45,534	17,669
46	Lincoln	$19,114	$35,800	$43,990	21,560	7,994
47	Mineral	$19,111	$31,790	$50,078	27,755	11,265
48	Wyoming	$19,009	$33,730	$47,273	22,866	9,199
49	Roane	$18,957	$31,813	$42,745	14,636	5,872
50	Hampshire	$18,477	$27,995	$41,950	23,542	10,194
51	Barbour	$18,039	$37,066	$45,005	16,731	6,041
52	Webster	$17,864	$29,086	$37,736	8,927	3,887
53	Gilmer	$17,115	$37,536	$50,698	8,644	2,744
54	Clay	$16,827	$31,325	$39,851	9,141	3,460
55	McDowell	$14,874	$24,921	$31,984	20,802	8,180
