= List of Maine locations by per capita income =

Maine has the thirty-fourth highest per capita income in the United States of America. In 2000, the state's average personal per capita income was $26,699. By 2003, that figure had risen to $29,851. By 2011, it was $38,299

== Maine counties ranked by per capita income ==
Note: Data is from the 2010 United States Census Data and the 2006-2010 American Community Survey 5-Year Estimates.

Rank	County	Per capita income	Median household income	Median family income	Population	Number of households
1	Cumberland	$31,041	$55,658	$71,335	281,674	117,339
2	Lincoln	$28,003	$47,678	$58,028	34,457	15,149
	United States	$27,334	$51,914	$62,982	308,745,538	116,716,292
3	York	$27,137	$55,008	$65,077	197,131	81,009
4	Sagadahoc	$26,983	$55,486	$66,650	35,293	15,088
5	Hancock	$26,876	$47,533	$60,092	54,418	24,221
	Maine	$25,385	$46,933	$58,185	1,328,361	557,219
6	Knox	$25,291	$45,264	$55,830	39,736	17,258
7	Kennebec	$24,656	$45,973	$56,853	122,151	51,128
8	Penobscot	$22,977	$42,658	$54,271	153,923	62,966
9	Androscoggin	$22,752	$44,470	$55,045	107,702	44,315
10	Waldo	$22,213	$41,312	$50,222	38,786	16,431
11	Oxford	$21,254	$39,748	$48,000	57,833	24,300
12	Franklin	$20,838	$39,831	$48,634	30,768	13,000
13	Somerset	$20,709	$36,647	$47,177	52,228	21,927
14	Aroostook	$20,251	$36,574	$47,114	71,870	30,961
15	Piscataquis	$19,870	$34,016	$43,821	17,535	7,825
16	Washington	$19,401	$34,859	$43,612	32,856	14,302
