= List of Idaho locations by per capita income =

Idaho's Per Capita Income Distribution by County

Total Idaho per capita income (wikidata:Q1221) = 29,494 US$ (2020 survey methodology)
(WD = Wikidata page)

[Hide/show County Per Capita Income]
	Idaho	per. US$
1	Ada County, Idaho	37,333^{WD}
2	Adams County, Idaho	30,136^{WD}
3	Bannock County, Idaho	25,044^{WD}
4	Bear Lake County, Idaho	27,596^{WD}
5	Benewah County, Idaho	24,737^{WD}
6	Bingham County, Idaho	24,947^{WD}
7	Blaine County, Idaho	36,232^{WD}
8	Boise County, Idaho	33,384^{WD}
9	Bonner County, Idaho	28,527^{WD}
10	Bonneville County, Idaho	28,171^{WD}
11	Boundary County, Idaho	26,796^{WD}
12	Butte County, Idaho	31,659^{WD}
13	Camas County, Idaho	31,291^{WD}
14	Canyon County, Idaho	23,919^{WD}
15	Caribou County, Idaho	26,640^{WD}
16	Cassia County, Idaho	23,406^{WD}
17	Clark County, Idaho	20,733^{WD}
18	Clearwater County, Idaho	25,357^{WD}
19	Custer County, Idaho	24,082^{WD}
20	Elmore County, Idaho	23,772^{WD}
21	Franklin County, Idaho	25,825^{WD}
22	Fremont County, Idaho	23,970^{WD}
23	Gem County, Idaho	26,671^{WD}
24	Gooding County, Idaho	24,388^{WD}
25	Idaho County, Idaho	24,811^{WD}
26	Jefferson County, Idaho	25,639^{WD}
27	Jerome County, Idaho	23,417^{WD}
28	Kootenai County, Idaho	30,912^{WD}
29	Latah County, Idaho	27,644^{WD}
30	Lemhi County, Idaho	25,417^{WD}
31	Lewis County, Idaho	24,994^{WD}
32	Lincoln County, Idaho	22,250^{WD}
33	Madison County, Idaho	21,943^{WD}
34	Minidoka County, Idaho	24,423^{WD}
35	Nez Perce County, Idaho	30,103^{WD}
36	Oneida County, Idaho	24,294^{WD}
37	Owyhee County, Idaho	23,798^{WD}
38	Payette County, Idaho	26,028^{WD}
39	Power County, Idaho	24,775^{WD}
40	Shoshone County, Idaho	24,564^{WD}
41	Teton County, Idaho	34,905^{WD}
42	Twin Falls County, Idaho	27,018^{WD}
43	Valley County, Idaho	31,192^{WD}
44	Washington County, Idaho	24,216^{WD}

The gross state product (state GDP) for Idaho was $128.1 billion in 2024, and the state's per capita income that year was $61,836. Idaho has the 46th highest GDP per capita in the United States of America.

== Idaho counties ranked by per capita income ==
Note: Data is from the 2010 United States Census Data and the 2006-2010 American Community Survey 5-Year Estimates.

Rank	County	Per capita income	Median household income	Median family income	Population	Number of households
1	Blaine	$32,656	$61,854	$73,929	21,376	8,823
2	Ada	$27,915	$55,835	$67,519	392,365	148,445
3	Valley	$27,577	$50,851	$59,737	9,862	4,393
	United States	$27,334	$51,914	$62,982	308,745,538	116,716,292
4	Bonner	$24,745	$41,943	$51,377	40,877	17,100
5	Kootenai	$24,418	$46,336	$55,840	138,494	54,200
6	Boise	$24,288	$48,789	$60,042	7,028	2,974
7	Nez Perce	$23,899	$44,395	$55,180	39,265	16,241
8	Teton	$23,633	$53,364	$56,791	10,170	3,651
9	Bonneville	$23,218	$50,445	$58,346	104,234	36,629
10	Adams	$22,730	$36,004	$45,590	3,976	1,748
11	Custer	$22,625	$41,910	$56,710	4,368	1,936
	Idaho	$22,518	$46,423	$54,689	1,567,582	579,408
12	Lemhi	$21,699	$36,411	$49,119	7,936	3,576
13	Bannock	$21,275	$44,848	$54,650	82,839	30,682
14	Caribou	$20,637	$44,958	$53,615	6,963	2,606
15	Clearwater	$20,507	$41,835	$46,415	8,761	3,660
16	Gem	$20,431	$42,794	$49,976	16,719	6,495
17	Butte	$20,414	$39,413	$47,225	2,891	1,129
18	Elmore	$20,388	$43,089	$50,840	27,038	10,140
19	Latah	$20,218	$36,974	$54,172	37,244	14,708
20	Washington	$20,015	$36,542	$46,970	10,198	4,034
21	Twin Falls	$19,892	$42,455	$49,188	77,230	28,760
22	Clark	$19,737	$40,909	$37,656	982	345
23	Camas	$19,659	$44,145	$43,092	1,117	487
24	Bear Lake	$19,284	$43,374	$47,092	5,986	2,281
25	Shoshone	$19,020	$36,654	$44,685	12,765	5,605
26	Jefferson	$19,019	$51,579	$55,705	26,140	8,146
27	Lincoln	$19,011	$45,714	$50,543	5,208	1,705
28	Idaho	$18,980	$34,536	$39,263	16,267	6,834
29	Payette	$18,814	$43,559	$50,323	22,623	8,262
30	Bingham	$18,633	$44,128	$51,750	45,607	14,999
31	Fremont	$18,616	$42,523	$52,510	13,242	4,436
32	Lewis	$18,580	$35,808	$41,250	3,821	1,657
33	Power	$18,412	$40,843	$46,391	7,817	2,641
34	Canyon	$18,366	$43,218	$48,219	188,923	63,604
35	Benewah	$18,312	$37,500	$41,759	9,285	3,837
36	Boundary	$18,011	$37,712	$43,562	10,972	4,421
37	Franklin	$17,967	$45,682	$50,586	12,786	4,079
38	Oneida	$17,950	$44,599	$51,371	4,286	1,545
39	Cassia	$17,782	$39,866	$47,995	22,952	7,666
40	Minidoka	$17,747	$40,350	$47,079	20,069	7,170
41	Gooding	$17,694	$37,228	$45,369	15,464	5,531
42	Owyhee	$17,373	$33,441	$36,405	11,526	4,076
43	Jerome	$16,947	$39,188	$45,947	22,374	7,540
44	Madison	$13,735	$35,461	$41,117	37,536	10,611
