= List of New York locations by per capita income =

New York is the sixth richest state in the United States of America, with a per capita income of $40,272.29 (2004).

== New York counties ranked by per capita income ==
Note: Data is from the 2010 United States Census Data and the 2006-2010 American Community Survey 5-Year Estimates.

Rank	County	Per capita income	Median household income	Median family income	Population	Number of households
1	New York County	$111,386	$64,971	$75,629	1,585,873	763,846
2	Westchester	$73,159	$79,619	$100,863	949,113	347,232
3	Nassau	$41,387	$93,613	$107,934	1,339,532	448,528
4	Putnam	$37,915	$89,218	$101,576	99,710	35,041
5	Suffolk	$35,755	$84,506	$96,220	1,493,350	499,922
6	Rockland	$34,304	$82,534	$96,836	311,687	99,242
7	Saratoga	$32,186	$65,100	$81,251	219,607	88,296
8	Columbia	$31,844	$55,546	$69,132	63,096	25,906
9	Dutchess	$31,642	$69,838	$83,599	297,488	107,965
	New York State	$30,948	$55,603	$67,405	19,378,102	7,317,755
10	Albany	$30,863	$56,090	$76,159	304,204	126,251
11	Richmond	$30,843	$71,084	$83,264	468,730	165,516
12	Hamilton	$29,965	$49,557	$59,911	4,836	2,262
13	Ulster	$28,954	$57,584	$70,513	182,493	71,049
14	Ontario	$28,950	$56,468	$69,877	107,931	43,019
15	Orange	$28,944	$69,523	$82,480	372,813	125,925
16	Warren	$27,744	$51,619	$64,195	65,707	27,990
17	Schenectady	$27,500	$55,188	$70,712	154,727	62,886
18	Rensselaer	$27,457	$54,152	$68,390	159,429	64,702
	United States	$27,334	$51,914	$62,982	308,745,538	116,716,292
19	Onondaga	$27,037	$50,676	$65,929	467,026	187,686
20	Monroe	$26,999	$51,303	$65,240	744,344	300,422
21	Erie	$26,378	$47,372	$63,404	919,040	383,164
22	Tompkins	$25,737	$48,655	$72,231	101,564	38,967
23	Queens	$25,553	$55,291	$62,459	2,230,722	780,117
24	Schoharie	$25,105	$50,864	$61,828	32,749	13,166
25	Tioga	$24,596	$51,948	$59,907	51,125	20,350
26	Essex	$24,390	$45,216	$55,781	39,370	16,262
27	Genesee	$24,323	$49,750	$60,127	60,079	23,728
28	Broome	$24,314	$44,457	$57,545	200,600	82,167
29	Madison	$24,311	$53,345	$61,828	73,442	27,754
30	Niagara	$24,224	$45,964	$59,471	216,469	90,556
31	Wayne	$24,092	$52,562	$60,324	93,772	36,585
32	Kings	$23,605	$43,567	$48,777	2,504,700	916,856
33	Greene	$23,461	$46,235	$55,260	49,221	19,823
34	Oneida	$23,458	$46,708	$58,017	234,878	93,028
35	Chemung	$23,457	$44,502	$55,246	88,830	35,462
36	Sullivan	$23,422	$48,103	$57,388	77,547	30,139
37	Steuben	$23,279	$43,867	$52,867	98,990	40,344
38	Yates	$23,255	$46,822	$56,538	25,348	9,517
39	Fulton	$23,147	$43,240	$50,425	55,531	22,554
40	Cayuga	$22,959	$48,415	$58,761	80,026	31,445
41	Delaware	$22,928	$42,967	$53,590	47,980	19,898
42	Livingston	$22,923	$51,690	$63,539	65,393	24,409
43	Otsego	$22,902	$45,268	$56,797	62,259	24,620
44	Clinton	$22,660	$47,489	$60,280	82,128	31,582
45	Montgomery	$22,347	$42,603	$53,476	50,219	20,272
46	Washington	$22,347	$48,327	$57,360	63,216	24,142
47	Schuyler	$22,123	$47,404	$54,322	18,343	7,530
48	Cortland	$22,078	$45,338	$57,743	49,336	18,671
49	Chenango	$22,036	$43,943	$52,229	50,477	20,436
50	Herkimer	$21,908	$42,318	$53,288	64,519	26,324
51	Jefferson	$21,823	$43,410	$51,834	116,229	43,451
52	Seneca	$21,818	$46,707	$53,857	35,251	13,393
53	Oswego	$21,604	$45,333	$56,364	122,109	46,400
54	Chautauqua	$21,033	$40,639	$51,031	134,905	54,244
55	Lewis	$20,970	$42,846	$49,554	27,087	10,514
56	Cattaraugus	$20,824	$42,466	$51,227	80,317	32,263
57	Orleans	$20,812	$48,063	$58,535	42,883	16,119
58	Wyoming	$20,605	$50,075	$58,009	42,155	15,501
59	St. Lawrence	$20,143	$42,303	$50,384	111,944	41,605
60	Allegany	$20,058	$41,305	$49,864	48,946	18,208
61	Franklin	$19,807	$42,050	$50,816	51,599	19,054
62	Bronx	$17,575	$34,264	$38,431	1,385,108	483,449
