= List of North Carolina locations by per capita income =

North Carolina is the twenty-eighth richest state in the United States of America, with a per capita income of $20,307 (2000).

== North Carolina Counties Ranked by Per Capita Income ==
Note: Data is from the 2010 United States Census Data and the 2006-2010 American Community Survey 5-Year Estimates.

Rank	County	Per capita income	Median household income	Median family income	Population	Number of households
1	Orange	$32,912	$52,981	$79,811	133,801	51,457
2	Wake	$32,592	$63,770	$81,461	900,993	345,645
3	Mecklenburg	$31,848	$55,294	$67,375	919,628	362,213
4	Dare	$30,327	$53,889	$65,778	33,920	14,335
5	Chatham	$29,991	$56,038	$66,120	63,505	25,845
6	New Hanover	$29,363	$48,553	$65,188	202,667	86,046
7	Union	$28,596	$63,386	$71,538	201,292	67,864
8	Durham	$27,503	$49,894	$62,890	267,587	109,348
	United States	$27,334	$51,914	$62,982	308,745,538	116,716,292
9	Carteret	$26,791	$46,155	$56,842	66,469	28,870
10	Brunswick	$26,315	$45,806	$54,644	107,431	46,297
11	Guilford	$26,267	$45,676	$59,367	488,406	196,628
12	Forsyth	$26,213	$46,749	$59,867	350,670	141,163
13	Cabarrus	$26,165	$53,928	$65,594	178,011	65,666
14	Macon	$26,156	$38,615	$46,702	33,922	14,591
15	Davie	$26,139	$49,727	$61,659	41,240	16,245
16	Currituck	$26,083	$55,376	$66,213	23,547	8,880
17	Henderson	$26,061	$46,446	$58,381	106,740	45,448
18	Moore	$25,786	$48,319	$61,068	88,247	37,540
19	Buncombe	$25,665	$44,190	$54,981	238,318	100,412
20	Iredell	$25,610	$48,962	$59,639	159,437	61,215
21	Camden	$25,544	$61,091	$74,320	9,980	3,675
	North Carolina	$24,745	$45,570	$56,153	9,535,483	3,745,155
22	Craven	$24,591	$44,599	$53,604	103,505	40,299
23	Haywood	$24,233	$41,377	$51,596	59,036	25,563
24	Polk	$24,008	$43,692	$55,846	20,510	8,989
25	Transylvania	$23,939	$39,408	$52,674	33,090	14,394
26	Nash	$23,909	$44,499	$55,186	95,840	37,782
27	Lincoln	$23,560	$47,450	$54,765	78,265	30,343
28	Avery	$23,465	$34,918	$47,644	17,797	6,664
29	Pamlico	$23,320	$40,561	$51,630	13,144	5,490
30	Catawba	$22,969	$43,484	$53,285	154,358	60,887
31	Pender	$22,872	$44,338	$54,087	52,217	20,333
32	Alamance	$22,819	$44,167	$52,806	151,131	59,960
33	Beaufort	$22,728	$40,653	$49,668	47,759	19,941
34	Johnston	$22,437	$49,745	$58,187	168,878	61,909
35	Gaston	$22,305	$43,253	$53,366	206,086	79,867
36	Cumberland	$22,285	$43,834	$50,910	319,431	122,431
37	Davidson	$22,268	$44,249	$54,652	162,878	64,515
38	Perquimans	$22,085	$43,041	$48,870	13,453	5,598
39	Pitt	$21,935	$38,592	$53,432	168,148	67,577
40	Person	$21,848	$44,668	$54,747	39,464	15,826
41	Pasquotank	$21,736	$44,085	$54,785	40,661	14,956
42	Granville	$21,733	$48,210	$57,203	59,916	20,628
43	Rowan	$21,525	$43,596	$52,850	138,428	53,140
44	Franklin	$21,331	$43,710	$51,591	60,619	23,023
45	Randolph	$21,297	$40,346	$49,257	141,752	55,373
46	Stanly	$21,139	$44,802	$58,125	60,585	23,589
47	Lee	$21,061	$44,120	$53,375	57,866	22,058
48	Onslow	$21,048	$43,561	$48,380	177,772	60,092
49	Watauga	$20,961	$31,967	$56,112	51,079	20,403
50	Chowan	$20,900	$36,761	$45,932	14,793	6,059
51	Stokes	$20,852	$42,689	$49,134	47,401	19,416
52	Rockingham	$20,801	$39,231	$48,641	93,643	38,693
53	Cherokee	$20,747	$38,144	$44,949	27,444	11,753
54	Alexander	$20,716	$40,014	$51,431	37,198	14,425
55	Wilson	$20,691	$38,596	$47,716	81,234	31,962
56	Surry	$20,541	$37,294	$47,248	73,673	29,914
57	Clay	$20,474	$35,109	$39,406	10,587	4,660
58	Wayne	$20,446	$41,224	$49,504	122,623	47,831
59	Yadkin	$20,379	$39,807	$50,990	38,406	15,486
60	Ashe	$20,350	$34,538	$46,537	27,281	11,755
61	Jackson	$20,228	$37,190	$49,500	40,271	16,446
62	Jones	$20,066	$38,354	$45,876	10,153	4,167
63	Gates	$19,893	$45,682	$55,559	12,197	4,665
64	Caldwell	$19,686	$37,261	$48,462	83,029	33,388
65	Wilkes	$19,406	$33,438	$43,439	69,340	28,360
66	Swain	$19,297	$35,071	$48,101	13,981	5,672
67	Cleveland	$19,284	$38,208	$47,460	98,078	38,555
68	Harnett	$19,274	$42,853	$52,708	114,678	41,594
69	Burke	$19,220	$37,139	$46,799	90,912	35,804
70	Sampson	$19,086	$35,740	$44,296	63,431	24,005
71	Lenoir	$19,017	$33,625	$42,317	59,495	24,327
72	Rutherford	$18,961	$35,364	$43,702	67,810	27,466
73	Alleghany	$18,919	$30,845	$38,535	11,155	4,778
74	Mitchell	$18,804	$32,743	$41,727	15,579	6,685
75	McDowell	$18,798	$34,953	$47,243	44,996	17,838
76	Madison	$18,792	$38,580	$49,838	20,764	8,494
77	Columbus	$18,784	$35,421	$45,193	58,098	22,489
78	Martin	$18,728	$34,766	$43,293	24,505	10,318
79	Montgomery	$18,618	$33,861	$43,740	27,798	10,544
80	Yancey	$18,576	$35,703	$42,252	17,818	7,644
81	Bladen	$17,890	$30,471	$41,937	35,190	14,430
82	Warren	$17,838	$30,641	$40,323	20,972	8,321
83	Graham	$17,825	$28,447	$34,831	8,861	3,701
84	Caswell	$17,814	$36,927	$44,401	23,719	9,190
85	Richmond	$17,692	$30,439	$38,881	46,639	18,430
86	Hoke	$17,630	$42,927	$47,281	46,952	16,532
87	Vance	$17,622	$34,025	$41,025	45,422	17,395
88	Bertie	$17,614	$29,110	$39,443	21,282	8,359
89	Greene	$17,362	$41,488	$48,409	21,362	7,313
90	Halifax	$50,223	$30,439	$40,569	54,691	21,970
91	Northampton	$17,128	$30,578	$40,230	22,099	9,193
92	Hertford	$17,002	$30,878	$39,973	24,669	9,334
93	Washington	$16,982	$32,716	$41,007	13,228	5,526
94	Anson	$16,856	$34,745	$39,612	26,948	9,755
95	Edgecombe	$16,747	$32,665	$41,857	56,552	21,680
96	Duplin	$16,693	$32,816	$40,774	58,505	22,495
97	Scotland	$16,297	$29,368	$37,232	36,157	13,614
98	Tyrrell	$15,812	$32,215	$37,708	4,407	1,595
99	Robeson	$15,321	$29,667	$34,788	134,168	47,997
100	Hyde	$14,992	$38,265	$44,406	5,810	2,119
