= List of Louisiana locations by per capita income =

Louisiana has the fourth lowest per capita income in the United States of America, at $16,912 (2000). Its personal per capita income is $26,100 (2003).

== Louisiana parishes ranked by per capita income ==
Note: Data is from the 2010 United States Census Data and the 2006-2010 American Community Survey 5-Year Estimates.

Rank	Parish	Per capita income	Median household income	Median family income	Population	Number of households
	United States	$27,334	$51,914	$62,982	308,745,538	116,716,292
1	Ascension	$26,888	$63,716	$72,288	107,215	37,790
2	La Salle	$26,791	$47,559	$60,712	14,890	5,468
3	East Baton Rouge	$26,260	$46,179	$60,256	440,171	172,057
4	Jefferson	$25,842	$48,175	$59,007	432,552	169,647
5	St. Charles	$25,728	$60,961	$66,971	52,780	18,557
6	Bossier	$25,630	$51,020	$62,700	116,979	45,215
7	Orleans	$24,929	$37,468	$46,170	343,829	142,158
8	Cameron	$24,634	$59,555	$62,500	6,839	2,575
9	Calcasieu	$23,591	$43,758	$54,091	192,768	73,996
10	Plaquemines	$23,378	$54,730	$67,488	23,042	8,077
11	Livingston	$23,372	$54,708	$61,227	128,026	46,007
	Louisiana	$23,094	$43,445	$53,702	4,533,372	1,728,360
12	Terrebonne	$22,931	$48,437	$57,189	111,860	40,091
13	Lafayette	$22,898	$47,492	$56,301	221,578	87,027
14	Caddo	$22,594	$37,181	$49,189	254,969	102,139
15	St. Tammany	$22,514	$60,866	$72,226	233,740	87,521
16	St. James	$22,509	$51,725	$59,379	22,102	7,717
17	West Baton Rouge	$22,101	$47,298	$54,442	23,788	8,688
18	Rapides	$21,982	$40,658	$51,487	131,613	50,401
19	Ouachita	$21,893	$39,823	$50,003	153,720	58,691
20	Beauregard	$21,543	$45,202	$51,254	35,654	13,159
21	Pointe Coupee	$21,533	$41,177	$53,394	22,802	9,082
22	Vermilion	$21,389	$42,693	$53,452	57,999	21,889
23	St. John the Baptist	$20,842	$47,666	$57,742	45,924	15,965
24	St. Martin	$20,687	$41,302	$51,761	52,160	19,216
25	Sabine	$20,626	$35,395	$45,913	24,233	9,622
26	Jefferson Davis	$20,487	$42,907	$52,370	31,594	11,771
27	Union	$20,375	$38,930	$48,394	22,721	9,144
28	Assumption	$20,348	$45,235	$51,657	23,421	8,736
29	Vernon	$20,191	$42,554	$47,954	52,334	19,165
30	DeSoto	$20,112	$38,007	$49,792	26,656	10,562
31	Iberia	$20,112	$41,783	$49,631	73,240	26,778
32	St. Mary	$20,057	$40,431	$46,628	54,650	20,457
33	Lafourche	$20,049	$37,572	$49,550	96,318	35,486
34	Red River	$20,044	$34,723	$43,058	9,091	3,472
35	Caldwell	$19,888	$37,423	$46,144	10,132	3,905
36	Tangipahoa	$19,788	$38,957	$50,438	121,097	45,135
37	Lincoln	$19,665	$35,247	$48,407	46,735	17,599
38	St. Bernard	$19,448	$39,200	$45,301	35,897	13,221
39	Iberville	$19,379	$42,215	$51,321	33,387	11,072
40	Jackson	$19,308	$40,674	$50,052	16,274	6,261
41	Webster	$19,254	$35,999	$44,737	41,207	16,537
42	Bienville	$18,873	$31,870	$40,396	14,353	5,838
43	Franklin	$18,676	$32,311	$39,783	20,767	7,904
44	Grant	$18,536	$40,092	$46,357	22,309	7,496
45	East Feliciana	$18,376	$35,335	$46,750	20,267	7,022
46	Natchitoches	$18,207	$30,326	$42,149	39,566	15,614
47	West Feliciana	$18,118	$43,411	$55,852	15,625	3,971
48	Acadia	$18,116	$37,261	$44,404	61,773	22,841
49	Richland	$18,060	$37,682	$42,512	20,725	7,551
50	St. Landry	$17,839	$31,813	$41,610	83,384	31,857
51	Evangeline	$17,561	$34,057	$43,838	33,984	12,829
52	Catahoula	$17,166	$36,398	$41,283	10,407	3,834
53	Washington	$17,120	$30,363	$37,633	47,168	18,113
54	Allen	$17,108	$36,926	$43,685	25,764	8,516
55	Avoyelles	$16,944	$31,412	$38,738	42,073	15,432
56	Claiborne	$16,925	$32,292	$40,705	17,195	6,017
57	West Carroll	$16,462	$33,901	$41,838	11,604	4,452
58	St. Helena	$16,387	$27,393	$34,199	11,203	4,333
59	East Carroll	$15,947	$24,038	$26,230	7,759	2,552
60	Concordia	$15,911	$30,062	$37,724	20,822	7,613
61	Winn	$15,833	$32,039	$40,975	15,313	5,469
62	Morehouse	$15,713	$31,781	$39,822	27,979	10,853
63	Tensas	$15,218	$27,157	$34,281	5,252	2,172
64	Madison	$13,089	$26,441	$38,788	12,093	4,025
