= Mining accident =

Accident occurring during the process of mining minerals

A mining accident is an accident that occurs during the process of mining minerals or metals. Thousands of miners die from mining accidents each year, especially from underground coal mining, although accidents also occur in hard rock mining. Coal mining is considered much more hazardous than hard rock mining due to flat-lying rock strata, generally incompetent rock, the presence of methane gas, and coal dust. Most of the deaths these days occur in developing countries, and rural parts of developed countries where safety measures are not practiced as fully. A mining disaster is an incident where there are five or more fatalities.

== Causes ==
Mining accidents can occur from a variety of causes, including leaks of poisonous gases such as hydrogen sulfide or explosive natural gases, especially firedamp or methane, dust explosions, collapsing of mine stopes, mining-induced seismicity, flooding, or general mechanical errors from improperly used or malfunctioning mining equipment (such as safety lamps or electrical equipment). The use of improper explosives underground can also cause methane and coal dust explosions.

== Worst mining disaster in history ==
On April 26, 1942, in the Benxihu (Honkeiko) coal mine in Liaoning Province, China, what is believed to be the worst mining disaster in history occurred when a coal dust explosion killed over 1,500 people.

The disaster occurred in an area that is now within the borders of modern-day China but was at the time part of the puppet state of Manchukuo established by Japan after it invaded and occupied northeast China in the 1930s. The Japanese administrators of the mine forced Chinese labourers to conduct the mining work under harsh conditions. The disaster began with a fire in the mine. In order to suppress it, the Japanese operators cut off the air in the ventilation shafts and blocked off the mine so as to deprive the blaze of oxygen. Most workers were not evacuated before these actions, and they were trapped within the sealed-off area of the mine; they suffocated to death as the fire burned off oxygen and led to carbon monoxide poisoning. Once the fire died out and the mine was re-opened, ten days were required for workers to remove debris and reach the bodies of those who had been trapped inside the mine.

The dead consisted of 1,518 Chinese and 31 Japanese. Most of the bodies were later buried in a mass grave. After the war and liberation of China by the Soviet Union, the disaster was investigated. The Soviet report concluded that the majority of the deaths were not caused directly by the initial fire but were the result of carbon monoxide poisoning and suffocation resulting from the decisions of the Japanese.

== Accidents by year ==
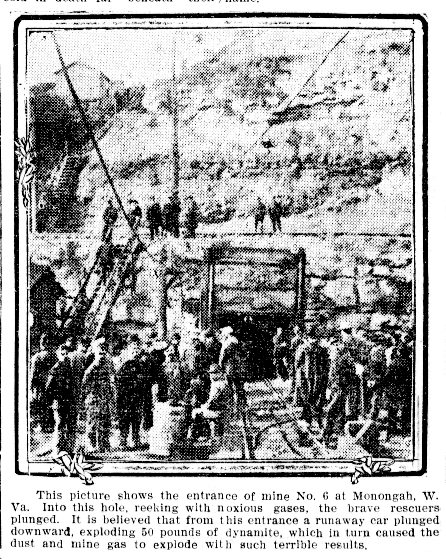
Monongah Mining disaster West Virginia, US 1907.

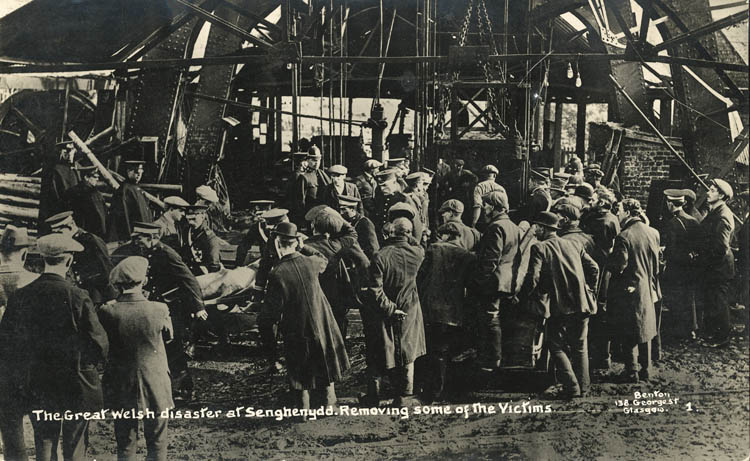
Senghenydd pit, Wales 1913.

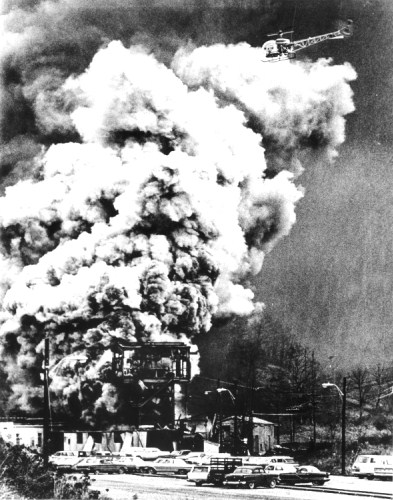
The Farmington coal mine disaster kills 78. West Virginia, US 1968.

This is an incomplete list of notable mining accidents and disasters that have killed at least 10 persons:

=== 19th century ===
| Date | Disaster | Location | Type | Death toll | References |
|---|---|---|---|---|---|
| 25 May 1812 | Felling Colliery disaster | Felling, England | coal dust explosion | 92 | |
| 10 April 1824 | 1824 Saint-Louis coal mine disaster | Champagney, France | firedamp explosion | 20 | |
| 26 September 1836 | Bignall Hill 1836 | Bignall Hill, England | firedamp explosion | 11 | |
| 28 September 1844 | Haswell mine disaster | Haswell, England | blackdamp explosion | 95 | |
| 14 January 1846 | Black Vein Colliery explosion | Risca, Wales | accidental explosion | 35 | |
| 9 July 1846 | East Wheal Rose disaster | East Wheal Rose, England | flooding | 39 | |
| 24 March 1853 | Ince Hall Colliery disaster | Ince-in-Makerfield, England | underground gas explosion | 50 | |
| 15 July 1856 | Cymmer Colliery explosion | Cymmer, Wales | underground gas explosion | 114 | |
| 19 February 1857 | Lundhill Colliery explosion | Wombwell, England | firedamp explosion | 189 | |
| 1 December 1860 | Black Vein Colliery explosion | Risca, Wales | methane gas explosion | more than 140 | |
| 16 January 1862 | Hartley Colliery disaster | New Hartley, England | fracture of pumping engine beam | 204 | |
| 12 December 1866 | Oaks explosion | Hoyle Mill, England | firedamp explosion | 361 | |
| 13 December 1866 | Talke o' the Hill Colliery explosion | Talke, England | underground gas explosion | 89 | |
| 8 November 1867 | First Ferndale Colliery disaster | Ferndale, Wales | underground gas explosion | 178 | |
| 1 April 1868 | Santa Elisa Mine disaster | Belmez, Spain | underground gas explosion | 29 | |
| 10 June 1869 | Second Ferndale Colliery disaster | Ferndale, Wales | underground gas explosion | 53 | |
| 6 September 1869 | Avondale Mine disaster | Plymouth Township, Pennsylvania, United States | fire | 110 | |
| 14 November 1872 | Pelsall Hall Colliery disaster | Pelsall, England | sulfur explosion | 22 | |
| 13 May 1873 | Drummond Colliery Disaster | Westville, Canada | firedamp explosion | 70 | |
| 14 April 1874 | Astley Deep Pit disaster | Dukinfield, England | firedamp explosion | 54 | |
| 30 April 1875 | Bunker's Hill Colliery explosion | Stoke-on-Trent, England | methane gas explosion | 43 | |
| 4 December 1875 | New Tredegar Colliery explosion | Bedwellty, Wales | firedamp explosion | 23 | |
| 6 December 1875 | Llan Colliery disaster | Gwaelod-y-Garth, Wales | firedamp explosion | 16 | |
| 6 December 1875 | Swaithe Main Colliery Explosion | Barnsley, England | firedamp explosion | 143 | |
| 30 December 1875 | Bochnia Salt mine fire | (Kingdom of Galicia and Lodomeria) Bochnia, Austrian Poland | fire | 12 | |
| 22 October 1877 | 1877 Blantyre mining disaster | Blantyre, Scotland | firedamp explosion | 207 | |
| 7 June 1878 | Wood Pit disaster | Haydock, England | underground gas explosion | 189 | |
| 11 September 1878 | Abercarn colliery disaster | Abercarn, Wales | firedamp explosion | 268 | |
| 13 January 1879 | Dinas Colliery Explosion | Llantrisant, Wales | underground gas explosion | 63 | |
| 10 February 1879 | Döllinger Mine disaster | (Lands of the Bohemian Crown) Dux, Bohemia | water leak | 23 | |
| 21 February 1879 | Kaitangata Mine disaster | Kaitangata, New Zealand | firedamp explosion | 34 | |
| 4 March 1879 | Victoria Colliery Stanley Pit explosion | Wakefield, England | firedamp explosion | 21 | |
| 2 July 1879 | 1879 Blantyre mining disaster | Blantyre, Scotland | underground gas explosion | 28 | |
| 1 September 1879 | Magny shaft disaster | Magny-Danigon, France | firedamp explosion | 16 | |
| 24 December 1879 | Sowcrofts colliery explosion | Kearsley, England | underground gas explosion | 11 | |
| 21 January 1880 | Lady Fair Pit explosion | Leycett, England | firedamp explosion | 62 | |
| 15 July 1880 | Risca New Colliery disaster | Wattsville, Wales | underground gas explosion | more than 120 | |
| 8 September 1880 | Seaham Colliery explosions | Seaham, England | underground explosion | 160 | |
| 24 September 1880 | Ludmiła Coal Mine disaster | Sosnowiec, Congress Poland | flooding | at least 16, possibly 200 | |
| 12 November 1880 | Foord Pit explosion | Stellarton, Canada | firedamp explosion | at least 44 | |
| 10 December 1880 | Naval Colliery Explosion | Tonypandy, Wales | underground gas explosion | 101 | |
| 4 March 1881 | First Almy Mine disaster | Almy, Wyoming, United States | underground gas explosion | 38 | |
| 11 September 1881 | Rockslide of Elm | Elm, Switzerland | rockslide | 115 | |
| 16 February 1882 | Trimdon Grange Explosion | Trimdon Grange, England | underground gas explosion | 69 | |
| 19 April 1882 | First West Stanley Pit disaster | West Stanley, England | firedamp explosion | 13 | |
| 12 December 1882 | New Australasian Gold Mine disaster | (Victoria (state)) Creswick, Victoria, Australia | flooding | 22 | |
| 16 February 1883 | Diamond Mine Disaster | Braidwood, Illinois, United States | flooding | 74 | |
| 7 November 1883 | Moorfield Colliery disaster | Altham, England | firedamp explosion | 68 | |
| 24 January 1884 | Jokerville Mine Explosion | Crested Butte, Colorado, United States | methane gas explosion | 59 | |
| 13 March 1884 | Laurel Mine explosion | Pocahontas, Virginia, United States | coal dust explosion | 112 | |
| 11 December 1884 | First Anina mine disaster | (Lands of the Crown of Saint Stephen) Anina, Hungary | fire | 47 | |
| 18 June 1885 | Clifton Hall Colliery disaster | Clifton, England | firedamp explosion | 178 | |
| 23 December 1885 | Mardy Colliery disaster | Rhondda Cynon Taf, Wales | underground gas explosion | 81 | |
| 12 January 1886 | Second Almy Mine disaster | Almy, Wyoming, United States | underground gas explosion | 11 | |
| 13 August 1886 | Bedford Colliery disaster | Bedford, England | firedamp explosion | 38 | |
| 18 February 1887 | National Colliery 1887 disaster | Wattstown, Wales | underground gas explosion | 39 | |
| 4 March 1887 | La Boule, Borinage | La Boule, Borinage, Belgium | methane gas explosion | 120 | |
| 23 March 1887 | Bulli Colliery explosion | Bulli, New South Wales, Australia | underground gas explosion | 81 | |
| 3 May 1887 | 1887 Nanaimo mine explosion | Nanaimo, Canada | improper use of explosives | 150 | |
| 28 May 1887 | Udston mining disaster | Hamilton, Scotland | firedamp explosion | 73 | |
| 11 July 1888 | Kimberly Mine Fire | Kimberly, South Africa | fire | 200 | |
| 22 June 1889 | Australian Agricultural Co. mine disaster | Hamilton, New South Wales, Australia | roof collapse | 11 | |
| 5 September 1889 | Mauricewood Colliery disaster | Penicuik, Scotland | fire | 63 | |
| 9 September 1889 | White Ash Mine disaster | Golden, Colorado, United States | flooding | 10 | |
| 16 October 1889 | Mossfield Colliery explosion | Longton, England | coal dust explosion | 64 | |
| 16 June 1890 | Hill Farm Mine Fire | Dunbar, Pennsylvania, United States | underground gas explosion | 31 | |
| 27 January 1891 | Mammoth Mine disaster | Mount Pleasant Township, Pennsylvania, United States | underground gas explosion | 109 | |
| 21 February 1891 | Springhill Mine Disaster | Springhill, Canada | coal dust explosion | 125 | |
| 22 May 1891 | Pratt No. 1 Mine explosion | Coalburg, Alabama, United States | firedamp explosion | 11 | |
| 7 January 1892 | Mine No.11 explosion | Krebs, Oklahoma, United States | accidental set off of explosives | nearly 100 | |
| 10 May 1892 | Roslyn mine explosion | Roslyn, Washington, United States | underground gas explosion | 45 | |
| 31 May 1892 | Maria ore mine fire | (Lands of the Bohemian Crown) Pribram, Bohemia | mine fire | 319 | |
| 26 August 1892 | Parc Slip Colliery accident | Aberkenfig, Wales | underground gas explosion | 112 | |
| 11 April 1893 | Great Western Mine fire | Hopkinstown, Wales | fire | 63 | |
| 4 July 1893 | Combs Colliery disaster | Thornhill, England | firedamp explosion | 139 | |
| 21 July 1893 | Senjski Rudnik disaster | (Kingdom of Serbia) Senjski Rudnik, Serbia | fire and cave-in | 28 | |
| 23 June 1894 | Albion Colliery explosion | Pontypridd, Wales | firedamp explosion | 290 | |
| 14 June 1894 | Karwin mine disaster | (Lands of the Bohemian Crown) Karwin, Bohemia | firedamp explosion | 235 | |
| 24 August 1894 | Franklin Mine disaster | Franklin, Washington, United States | fire | 37 | |
| 20 October 1894 | Second Anina mine disaster | (Lands of the Crown of Saint Stephen) Anina, Hungary | underground gas explosion | 48 | |
| 14 January 1895 | Diglake Colliery Flooding | Bignall End, England | flooding | 77 | |
| 12 January 1886 | Third Almy Mine disaster | Almy, Wyoming, United States | underground gas explosion | 62 | |
| 3-4 March 1896 | Kleofas coal mine disaster | (Kingdom of Prussia) Kattowitz, Prussia | poisonous gases | 104 | |
| 27 January 1896 | Tylorstown No. 8 Pit disaster | Tylorstown, Wales | methane gas explosion | 57 | |
| 26 March 1896 | Brunner Mine disaster | Brunner Mine, New Zealand | firedamp explosion | 65 | |
| 30 April 1896 | Peckfield Colliery Disaster | Micklefield, England | firedamp explosion | 63 | |
| 28 June 1896 | Twin Shaft disaster | Pittston, Pennsylvania, United States | massive cave-in | 58 | |
| 2-4 December 1896 | Stockton Colliery disaster | Stockton, New South Wales, Australia | gas inhalation | 11 | |
| 18 December 1896 | Resica mine explosion | (Lands of the Crown of Saint Stephen) Domány, Hungary | underground gas explosion and fire | 80 | |
| 10 May 1897 | Snaefell Mine disaster | Snaefell, Isle of Man | carbon monoxide poisoning | 20 | |
| 24 January 1898 | Second Resica mine explosion | (Lands of the Crown of Saint Stephen) Domány, Hungary | underground gas explosion and cave-in | 10 | |
| 21 March 1898 | Dudley Colliery explosion | Redhead, New South Wales, Australia | firedamp explosion | 15 | |
| 19 April 1898 | Whitwick Colliery Disaster | Coalville, England | fire | 35 | |
| 15 June 1899 | 1899 Hokoku Coal Mine Disaster | Itoda, Japan | coal dust explosion | 210-215 | |
| 16 June 1899 | Caledonia Mine explosion | Glace Bay, Canada | firedamp explosion | 11 | |
| 28 August 1899 | Sumitomo Besshi mine disaster | Niihama, Japan | landslide | 512 | |
| 6 March 1900 | Red Ash Mine disaster | Fire Creek, West Virginia, United States | carbon monoxide poisoning | 46 | |
| 1 May 1900 | Scofield Mine disaster | Scofield, Utah, United States | coal dust explosion | at least 200 | |
| 19 September 1900 | Frisch Glück Mine Disaster | (Lands of the Bohemian Crown) Dux, Bohemia | underground gas explosion | 55 | |

=== 20th century ===
- May 19, 1902: 216 miners were killed in the Fraterville Mine disaster in Fraterville, Tennessee
- January 25, 1904: 179 miners and two aid workers were killed in the Harwick mine disaster, Harwick, Pennsylvania
- April 28, 1904: 63 people were killed in Villanueva del Río, Sevilla; it was the worst mining accident recorded in Spain.
- October 28, 1904; 19 miners were killed in Tercio, Colorado by a coal dust explosion.
- February 20, 1905 Virginia City Mine explosion (Alabama), 112 killed.
- March 10, 1906: Courrières mine disaster in Courrières, France. 1,099 workers died in the worst mine accident in European history.
- December 1, 1907: Naomi Mine Explosion in Fayette City, Pennsylvania. 34 workers died.
- December 4, 1907 Giroux Mining Accidents Ely, Nevada. 2 dead; 3 trapped.
- December 6, 1907: Monongah Mining disaster in Monongah, West Virginia. Official death toll is 362, but due to inadequate record keeping, the true death toll could be around 500. Victims were mostly Italian immigrant workers, including children. The disaster is widely considered the worst coal mining accident in American history.
- December 16, 1907: Yolande mine explosion near Birmingham, Alabama. Fifty-seven killed.
- December 19, 1907: Darr Mine disaster in Rostraver Township, Pennsylvania. 239 workers died, including children.
- August 18, 1908: Maypole Colliery disaster in Abram, Greater Manchester, England. 75 men and boys died.
- November 28, 1908: Marianna mine explosion near Marianna, Pennsylvania. 154 men killed, one survivor.
- November 13, 1909: Cherry Mine disaster in Cherry, Illinois. 259 workers, some as young as eleven, died in this mine fire, which had the most fatalities of any mine fire in the United States.
- December 21, 1910: The Pretoria Pit disaster in Westhoughton, Lancashire, 344 men and boys lost their lives in this explosion, which is the worst mining disaster on one day in England.
- January 20, 1911: 40 coal miners die in Sosnowiec, Russian Poland.
- April 8. 1911 Banner Mine disaster near Littleton, Alabama. Of the 128 men killed, most were leased Black convicts.
- August 24, 1911 Giroux Mining Accidents Ely, Nevada 7 dead 2 injured
- December 9, 1911: Cross Mountain Mine disaster killed 84 miners in Briceville, Tennessee
- October 14, 1913: Senghenydd colliery disaster, the worst mining accident in the United Kingdom; 439 workers died in Wales.
- October 22, 1913: Dawson Stag Canon Number 2 Mine disaster, near Dawson, New Mexico, where 263 workers were killed due to illegal use of dynamite.
- April 28, 1914: The Eccles mine disaster was an explosion of coal-seam, in Eccles, West Virginia. The explosion took the lives of at least 180 men and boys
- June 8, 1917: Speculator Mine disaster in Butte, Montana. An electric cable being lowered into the mine was accidentally ignited at 2,500 feet below the surface. The fire quickly climbed the cable and ignited the mine's wooden shaft. The shaft became a chimney, eliminating the mine's primary source of oxygen. Nearly all of the 168 fatalities were due to asphyxia, from carbon monoxide poisoning. This is the deadliest underground hard rock mining disaster in United States history.
- January 12, 1918 Minnie Pit disaster in Staffordshire, England was a coal mining accident in which 155 men and boys died (144 from carbon monoxide poisoning and 11 from violence, plus carbon monoxide poisoning). The disaster, which was caused by an explosion due to firedamp, is the worst ever recorded in the North Staffordshire Coalfield. An official investigation never established what caused the ignition of flammable gases in the pit.
- September 19, 1921 Mount Mulligan mine disaster in Mount Mulligan, Far North Queensland, Australia killed 75. The disaster was caused by the accidental or negligent firing of an explosive charge on top of a block of coal, apparently in order to split it.
- February 8, 1923 The Dawson Stag Canon #1 Mine Explosion killed 123; many were descendants of men killed in the 1913 explosion at the same mine. As a mine car derailed, it caused sparks and ignited coal dust, causing the explosion.
- March 8, 1924 The Castle Gate Mine disaster killed 171 miners and one rescue worker. At least 24 mules, 16 canaries, and an unknown number of horses died in the disaster and rescue & recovery efforts. The Castle Gate mine disaster currently ranks as the 10th worst mining disaster in United States history and the second worst mining disaster in the history of the state of Utah, following the Scofield Mine disaster of 1900, which killed 200 miners.
- February 20, 1925 The City Mine Disaster, Sullivan County, Indiana, United States. An explosion occurred at this coal mine, killing 51.
- November 3, 1926 The Barnes-Hecker Mine Disaster, near Ishpeming, Michigan, United States. A stope collapse allowed water and quicksand to fill most of the mine within 15 minutes, and 51 miners drowned.
- 1927–1932: Hawks Nest Tunnel disaster, near Gauley Bridge, West Virginia, United States. Over several years, 476 workers died from silicosis.
- January 3, 1934: Nelson III Coal Mine, Osek u Duchcova, Czechoslovakia, Accumulated coal dust explosion. 142 dead miners including one woman. In June 1934, the accumulated gases knocked out the masonry cover above the pit and killed two more workers - the number of victims thus rose to 144.
- April 21, 1934: 1934 Kakanj mine disaster. 127 miners died in an explosion in the Kakanj coal mine in Kakanj, Kingdom of Yugoslavia.
- April 12-23, 1936: Moose River Gold Mines disaster. One miner died and two more were injured after being trapped underground for 11 days.
- July 2, 1937 The Holditch (also known as Brymbo) Colliery disaster was a coal mining accident in Chesterton, Staffordshire, England, in which 30 men died and eight were injured. It was caused due to a fire and subsequent explosions. Fatalities were exacerbated because management chose to try to save the coal seam, and risked the lives of mine workers while delaying evacuation.
- November 11, 1937: According to Japanese government official confirmed report, after a long period of heavy rain, a huge landslide hit the Ogushi sulfur mine, followed by a landslide and smelter fire at Tsumagoi, Gunma Prefecture, Japan, resulting in 245 human fatalities and 32 persons injured.
- May 10, 1938: Explosion in Markham No. 1 Colliery near Staveley, Derbyshire, England. 79 workers died and 40 were seriously injured.
- February 28, 1940: Minerary Explosion in Raša near Labin, Kingdom of Italy. 185 workers died, 150 were injured.
- July 15, 1940: Sonman Explosion near Portage, Pennsylvania. 63 workers died.
- April 26, 1942: Benxihu Colliery disaster in Benxi, Liaoning, China. 1,549 workers died, in the worst coal mine accident ever in the world. At the time, during World War II, this area was occupied by Japan and the mine was under control of Japanese managers. The overwhelming number of dead were Chinese forced labourers.
- June 19, 1945: 1945 El Teniente mining accident in El Teniente, Chile. 355 workers died and another 747 were injured.
- February 20, 1946: Monopol Grimberg III/IV disaster in Bergkamen, Ruhr, Germany. 405 died.
- March 25, 1947: Coal dust explosion in Centralia, Illinois, mine killed 111 miners.
- July 14, 1949: firedamp explosion at the María Luisa pit (Langreo, Asturias, Spain), killing 17 miners and 4 mules.
- September 7, 1950: Knockshinnoch Mine Disaster: Ayrshire Scotland: Liquid peat and moss flooded the mine, trapping over 100 men underground. It took days to reach the trapped men of whom 13 died.
- December 21, 1951: Orient 2 coal mine explosion in West Frankfort, Illinois. 119 workers died.
- December 10, 1954: Newton Chikli Colliery disaster, Chhindwara (M.P.), India. Flooding of the mine was caused by inrush of water from old workings of the same mine. There were 112 persons inside the mine when it was flooded. 49 persons managed to escape through the incline; the remaining 63 persons were trapped and drowned.
- August 8, 1956: Bois du Cazier disaster in Marcinelle, Belgium. A fire in the mines resulted in 262 deaths; of the 274 people working in Bois du Cazier on that morning, only twelve survived. 138 of the victims were Italian migrant workers.
- October 28, 1958: Oglebay-Norton mine, Craigsville, West Virginia 14 died.
- January 22, 1959: Knox Mine disaster at River Slope Mine, Port Griffith Luzerne County, Pennsylvania – flooding from the riverbed above works killed 12 miners
- October 15, 1959: Mohawk Mine disaster at Silver Peak, Esmeralda County, Nevada - the collapse of the condemned Hines 202 stope buried 3 miners who were never recovered.
- January 21, 1960: Coalbrook mining disaster, South Africa, 437 died.
- May 9, 1960: Laobaidong colliery coal dust explosion Datong, China, 682 died.
- July 7, 1961: Dukla Coal Mine, Dolní Suchá, Czechoslovakia, Fire and carbon monoxide poisoning caused the deaths of 108 miners.
- November 5, 1962: Kings Bay in Ny-Ålesund on the Norwegian territory of Svalbard 21 miners killed in an explosion.
- November 9, 1963: Mitsui Miike Coal Mine disaster Mitsui Miike, Ōmuta, Fukuoka, Japan; 458 died.
- March 28, 1965: Several tailing dams at a copper mine failed during an earthquake, releasing water and slag which wiped out the town of El Cobre in Valparaíso Region, Chile; 350–400 miners and residents died.
- May 17, 1965: Cambrian Colliery in South Wales; 31 died.
- May 28, 1965: Dhanbad coal mine disaster took place in Jharkhand, India, killing over 300 miners.
- June 7, 1965: 1965 Kakanj mine disaster. 128 miners died in an explosion in the Kakanj coal mine in Kakanj, SR Bosnia and Herzegovina, SFR Yugoslavia.
- October 21, 1966: Aberfan Disaster was a catastrophic collapse of a colliery spoil-tip that caused an avalanche in the Welsh village of Aberfan, engulfing Pantglas Junior School, killing 116 children and 28 adults.
- November 20, 1968: Farmington Mine Disaster in Farmington, West Virginia. 78 workers died. As a result of the disaster, the U.S. Congress passed the Federal Coal Mine Health and Safety Act of 1969.
- December 30, 1970: Hurricane Creek mine disaster in Hyden, Kentucky. 39 miners died due to unsafe mine conditions. Occurred exactly one year after the passage of the Federal Coal Mine Health and Safety Act of 1969.
- June 6, 1972: Wankie coal mine disaster Wankie, Rhodesia/Zimbabwe, 426 fatalities.
- March 21, 1973: Lofthouse Colliery disaster, West Yorkshire, England, seven fatalities.
- July 30, 1973: Markham Colliery disaster near Staveley, Derbyshire, England. 18 workers were killed and 11 seriously injured when a descending cage failed to slow at the bottom of the mine shaft.
- December 27, 1974: An explosion and a fire in a coal mine near Liévin, France kills 41 and injures a further six in the worst mining disaster in France since World War II.
- December 27, 1975: Chasnala mining disaster, Dhanbad, Jharkhand, India, 372 miners died and another 130 contract workers are claimed to have died when water from adjacent mine gusted after the wall in between collapsed.
- October 16, 1981: A methane explosion in a coal mine owned by Kokutan Yubari Mining Company near Yūbari, Hokkaido resulted in 93 deaths including 10 rescuers.
- December 8, 1981: No. 21 Mine explosion near Whitwell, Tennessee. 13 coal miners died as a result of the explosion.
- January 18, 1984: Miike coal mine A fire in a mine owned by Mitsui Mining Company near Ōmuta, Fukuoka resulted in 83 deaths and an additional 13 injuries.
- July 19, 1985: Val di Stava dam collapse took place in the village of Stava, near Tesero, Italy, when two tailings dams failed that had been used for sedimenting the mud from the nearby Prestavel mine. It resulted in one of Italy's worst disasters, killing 268 people, destroying 63 buildings, and demolishing eight bridges.
- September 16, 1986 Kinross mining disaster. In South Africa an underground fire killed 177 people.
- June 2, 1988 Stolzenbach mining disaster in Borken, Hesse. A lignite mine devastated by an explosion, 57 fatalities.
- November 18, 1989: 90 miners killed in the Aleksinački Rudnik mine in SR Serbia, SFRepublic of Yugoslavia.
- August 26, 1990: Dobrnja-Jug mine disaster. 180 miners were killed at the Mramor coal mine near Tuzla, SR Bosnia and Herzegovina, SFR Yugoslavia.
- May 9, 1992: Westray Mine, Pictou County, Nova Scotia. 26 killed in a methane and coal dust explosion.
- May 9, 1993: Nambija mine disaster, Nambija, Ecuador. Approximately 300 people were killed in a landslide
- May 13, 1993: Middelbult colliery near the town of Secunda in South Africa. 53 people killed in an underground methane explosion.
- August 28, 1994: Rajpura Dariba Mine VRM disaster, Dariba, Udaipur, India: This incident occurred due to flooding of the slurry from a mined VRM Underground mining hard rock stop, where cemented fill could not settle and its plug failed. This slurry accumulated in the plugged shaft, which could not take the load and subsequently failed. All of the material fell in the shaft, resulting in the drowning deaths of 63 people working below.
- February 22, 1994: Merriespruit tailings dam disaster, where 17 people died when a tailings dam failed.
- May 10, 1995: Vaal Reefs mining disaster, South Africa; a locomotive fell down a lift shaft and landed on a cage, causing the deaths of 104 people.
- March 24, 1996: Marcopper mining disaster, occurred in the island province of Marinduque, Philippines. A mine tailings pit fracture caused toxic waste to flood the Makulapnit-Boac river, displacing 400 families in Barangay Hinapulan. Drinking water contamination killed fish and shrimp, while large animals perished. Crops, irrigation channels, and the Boac River were destroyed. A year after, Republic Act No. 7942, also known as "The Philippine Mining Act of 1995" was enacted.
- August 31, 1995: firedamp explosion at the San Nicolás Pit (Ablaña, Asturias, Spain), killing 14 miners.
- July 17, 1998: Lassing mining disaster

=== 21st century ===
- January 30, 2000: Baia Mare cyanide spill took place in Baia Mare, Romania. The accident, called the worst environmental disaster in Europe since Chernobyl, was a release of 100,000 tons of cyanide-contaminated water by an Aurul mining company when a reservoir broke, releasing its waters into the rivers Someş, Tisza and Danube. Although no human fatalities were reported, the leak killed up to 80% of aquatic life of some of the affected rivers.
- October 11, 2000: 2000 Martin County coal slurry spill occurred after midnight when the bottom of a coal slurry impoundment owned by Massey Energy in Martin County, Kentucky, broke into an abandoned underground mine below. The slurry came out of the mine openings, sending an estimated 306 million US gallons (1.16 million cubic metres; 1.16 billion litres) of slurry down two tributaries of the Tug Fork River. By morning, Wolf Creek was oozing with the black waste; on Coldwater Fork, a 10-foot-wide (3.0 m) stream became a 100-yard (91 m) expanse of thick slurry.
- September 23, 2001: Brookwood Mine Disaster At approximately 5:15 p.m., at the Jim Walter Resources No. 5 coal mine in Brookwood, Alabama a cave-in caused a release of methane gas that sparked two major explosions, killing 13 miners.
- January 23, 2002: La Espuela Coal Mine disaster The disaster was caused by flooding of the shaft. Without the ability to flee, the 13 miners drowned.
- February 19, 2006: Pasta de Conchos accident. 65 miners lost their lives in the mining accident near Nueva Rosita, Coahuila, Mexico. Only 2 bodies were recovered.
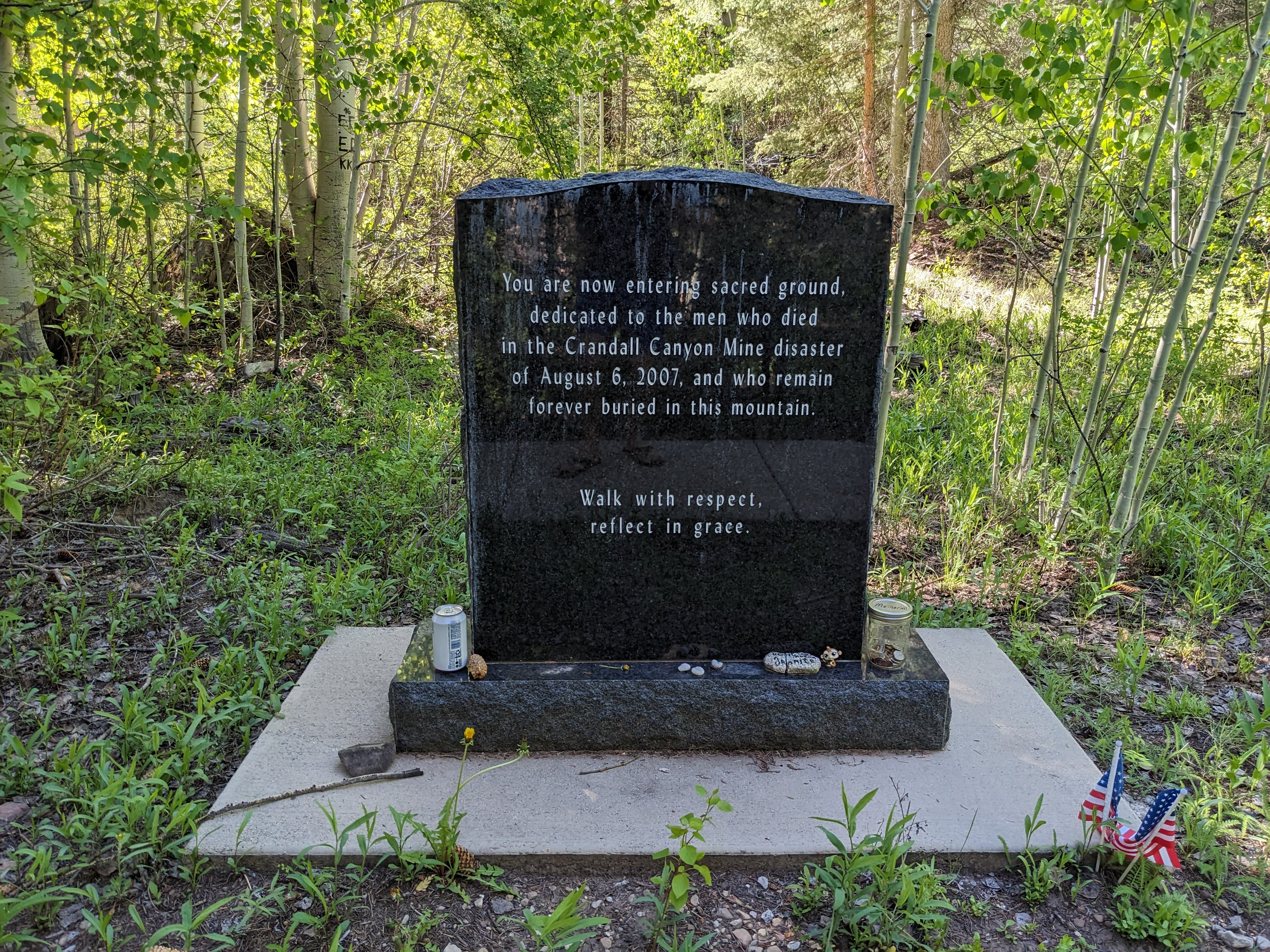
- A memorial to the men killed in the Crandall Canyon Mine collapse.
  August 6, 2007: Crandall Canyon Mine collapse. 6 miners and 3 rescue workers killed after subsequent collapses caused by inadequate mine design.
- May–June 2009: 2009 Harmony Gold mine deaths - at least 82 miners died from inhalation of poisonous gasses created by a fire in a closed section of the mine where unofficial miners were operating illegally.
- April 5, 2010: Upper Big Branch Mine disaster, West Virginia. An explosion occurred in Massey Energy's Upper Big Branch coal. 29 of 31 miners at the site were killed.
- May 8, 2010: Raspadskaya mine explosion in Kemerovo Oblast, Russia. An explosion believed to have been caused by a methane build up. 66 people were confirmed to have died with at least 99 others injured and as many as 24 unaccounted for.
- November 19, 2010: Pike River Mine disaster in New Zealand. At 3:45 pm, the coal mine exploded. 29 men underground died immediately, or shortly afterwards, from the blast or from the toxic atmosphere. Two men in the stone drift, some distance from the mine workings, managed to escape. (Extract from Royal Commission of Enquiry Report on Pike River.)
- October 28, 2013: a leak of firedamp gas killed six miners working at a depth of almost 700 metres in the Emilio del Valle mine in León, Castille and León, Spain.
- May 13, 2014: Soma mine disaster took place in Soma, Turkey. The accident was reportedly the worst mining accident ever in Turkey, and is the worst mining accident in the 21st century so far. 301 people died.
- January 6, 2019: 2019 Kohistan mine collapse, Afghanistan. The accident killed at least 30 gold miners.
- July 2, 2020: At least 174 people were killed in a landslide in the 2020 Hpakant jade mine disaster in the Hpakant area in Myanmar.
- December 1, 2020: At least 18 people were killed by a carbon monoxide leak in the Diaoshuidong mine disaster in Chongqing in China.
- November 25, 2021: Listvyazhnaya mine disaster in Kemerovo Oblast, Russia. Smoke from a fire in a ventilation shaft caused the suffocation of over 40 miners.
- May 30, 2022: At least 12 people were killed by an explosion in La Mestiza coal mine in Colombia.
- August 3, 2022: 10 people missing after flooding at the El Pinabete coal mine in Sabinas, Coahuila, Mexico.
- October 14, 2022: 41 killed in 2022 Turkish Mine Explosion in Bartın.
- May 18, 2023: At least 31 miners died at an abandoned mine being mined illegally in Welkom, South Africa.
- October 28, 2023: 46 killed in Kostenko mine disaster in the Karaganda Region of Kazakhstan.
- March 31, 2025: At least 5 killed and 4 injured by an explosion at the Cerredo mine in Degaña, Asturias.
- January 28, 2026: Over 400 people are killed in a mine collapse triggered by a landslide at the Rubaya mines in the Democratic Republic of the Congo.
- July 30, 2026: At least 34 people are killed in a methane gas explosion and mine collapse at a coal mine in Sor-Range on the outskirts of Quetta, Pakistan.

== Accidents by country ==
=== Australia ===
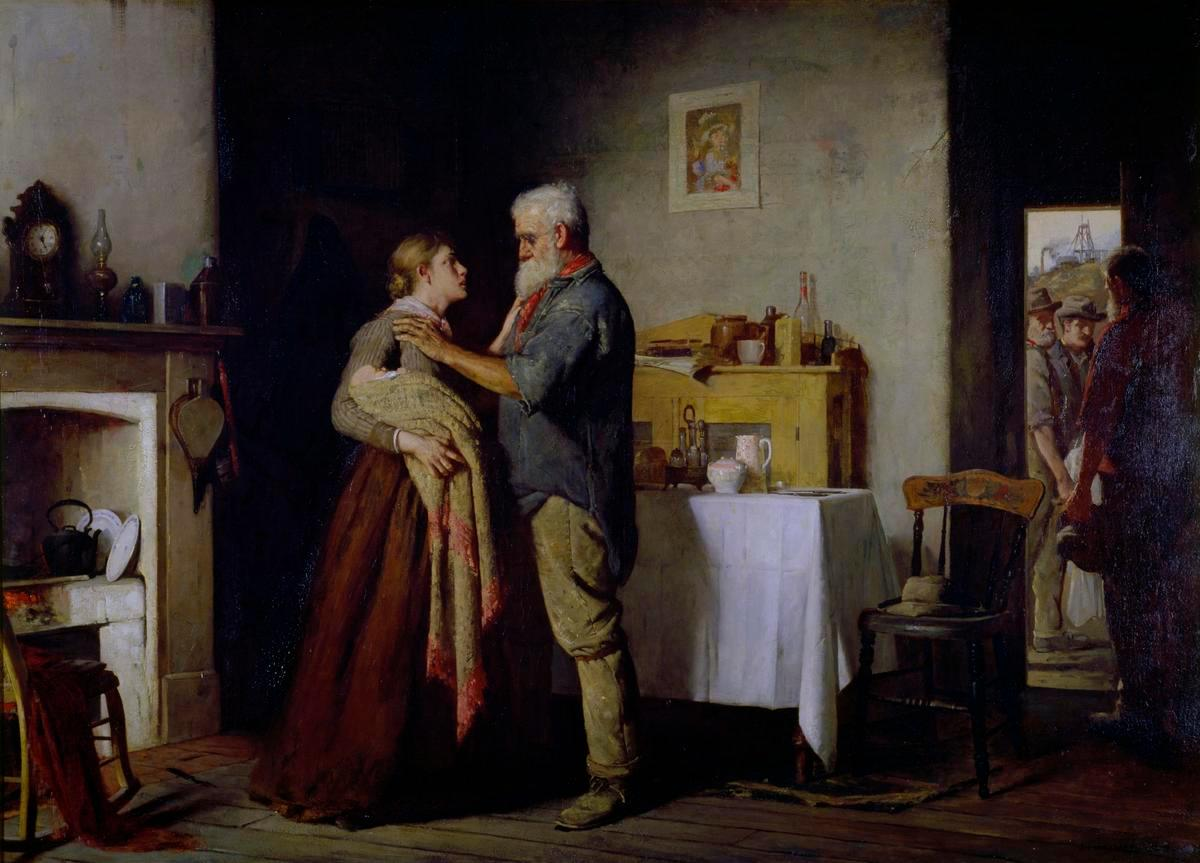
Breaking the News, painted by Australian artist John Longstaff in 1887, depicts a miner informing a widow of her husband's death in a mining accident.

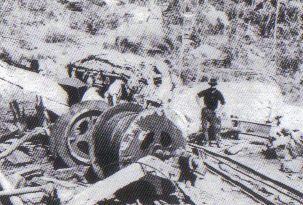
Mount Mulligan disaster 1921 – the steel cable drums were blown 50 feet from their foundations.

22 miners drowned in December 1882 in the Australasian number 2 deep lead gold mine at Creswick in Victoria. The mine was violently flooded by a burst of water when miners digging a new drive approached too close to the abandoned and flooded Australasian number 1 workings, due to an error in surveying by the manager of the mine. 5 miners survived and were rescued after 50 hours trapped underground. This disaster, with the highest death toll from a gold mine disaster in Australian history, left 63 children without fathers and 18 widows.

The Bulli Mine Disaster of 23 March 1887 involved a gas explosion in the mine that killed 81 men and boys, leaving 50 women widows and 150 children without fathers.

The Mount Kembla Mine Disaster of 31 July 1902 was an explosion resulting in the death of 96 miners, including two engaged in rescue work. It remains the worst mining disaster in Australian history.

A coal dust explosion at the Mount Mulligan mine on 19 September 1921 killed 75 workers.

Tasmania's Beaconsfield Mine collapse occurred on 25 April 2006. Of the 17 people who were in the mine at the time, 14 escaped immediately following the collapse, one was killed and the remaining two were found alive after five days. The survivors were trapped in a 1.5m x 1.2m cherry picker cage, which had saved them from being crushed by rocks. As it was not safe for rescuers to blast their way through, a special borer was brought in to drill an escape shaft. They were finally released on 9 May after 14 days underground.

Three mining disasters occurred at Moura in a 20-year period. The first of these was in 1975, at the Kianga Mine, where 13 men died in an underground explosion. The mine was sealed without their bodies being retrieved. In 1986 a second disaster occurred, as an underground explosion, which took the lives of 12 miners. The bodies of all those persons were retrieved. In Moura on 7 August 1994 a third major mining accident occurred with an explosion at Moura No. 2 Mine. A second explosion at the mine approximately a day and a half later saw rescue attempts abandoned, and the mine was sealed, with the bodies of the 11 miners unretrieved.

In the 1996 Gretley coal mine disaster, near Newcastle, four men were killed when their mining machine broke into the flooded workings of an old coalmine, abandoned over 80 years earlier.

Four miners were killed in a windblast incident at the Northparkes mine outside the New South Wales town of Parkes in 1999.

A mine collapsed at Ballarat Gold Mine in Victoria on March 14, 2024, resulting in a man dead, and another in critical condition. The two had been 'air legging' in a prohibited area under unsupported ground when the collapse occurred at 4:50pm. 29 other miners took refuge in a safety pod and were later brought to safety. The air legging technique is to be no longer used temporarily while a work safe investigation is underway. Australian Workers' Union organiser Ross Kenna said the geology of the mine is not suitable for the technique.

=== Belgium ===
On March 4, 1887, 120 miners died in a coal mine in La Boule, Borinage due to a methane explosion.

On the morning of August 8, 1956, a fire in the mine Bois du Cazier in Marcinelle caused 262 victims, with only 12 survivors. A mining cart on an elevator cage hit an oil pipe and electricity lines, with the resulting fire trapping the miners. Most of the victims were immigrants (136 Italians, 8 Poles, 6 Greeks, 5 Germans, 5 Frenchmen, 3 Hungarians, 1 Englishman, 1 Dutchman, 1 Russian and 1 Ukrainian.)

=== Bosnia and Herzegovina ===
On September 4, 2014, after a 3.5 Richter earthquake hit Zenica caused rock burst in coal mine "Raspotočje", 34 miners remained trapped inside the mine. It was later reported that 5 miners were killed in the accident.

=== Canada ===
- The 1887 Nanaimo mine explosion in Nanaimo, British Columbia killed 150 miners at the No 1 Esplanade Mine. Explosives were laid improperly triggering a massive mine-wide explosion. Most miners were killed instantly, only 7 survived. Of the 150 workers killed, 53 of them were Chinese, the names of which are mostly unknown.
- The Hillcrest mine disaster, the worst coal mining disaster of Canadian history, occurred in Alberta in 1914. Deaths from the methane and coal dust-fueled explosion numbered 189; news coverage was eclipsed by the First World War. The mine remained in use until 1939.
- On May 20, 1980, a mining disaster in Val-d'Or, Quebec killed eight men under 68,000 tons of debris when part of a 150-meter shaft collapsed; 16 men escaped by scrambling through a partially completed ventilation shaft. Charges of manslaughter were made against the company which pled non guilty. It was not the fault of the owners of the operation, a jury has found in acquitting Belmoral Mines Ltd. on all charges. A song about this event called La tragédie de la Balmoral was recorded and published by singer Jean-Guy Gauthier in 1981.
- On 18 September 1992, at the height of a labour dispute at the Giant Mine near Yellowknife, an explosion resulting from a bomb planted by striking worker "Roger Warren", killed nine men riding through a transport tunnel.
- Coal mining accidents in the province of Nova Scotia spanning 65 years referred to collectively as the Springhill mining disasters, which claimed in total at least 138 lives of men and boys due to coal dust explosions. The Westray Mine disaster in 1992 claimed the lives of 26 miners in a methane/coal dust explosion at a recently opened mining operation. Both of these mines were subsequently permanently closed in the wake of these events.
- On 17 May 2006, four people died due to asphyxiation in an accident at the decommissioned Sullivan Mine.

=== Central African Republic ===
In June 2013, heavy rains provoked the collapse of a gold mine in Ndassima, killing 37 miners and injuring many others.

=== Chile ===
In June 1945, during a fire, 355 workers died in El Teniente by inhaling carbon monoxide, in what was called the "Tragedia del Humo" (English: The Smoke Tragedy).

In January 2006, an explosion occurred in a mine in Copiapó, leaving 70 miners trapped underground. The miners were rescued after a brief period of time, but two people died.

In August 2010, 33 miners were trapped underground in Copiapó. After two weeks communication was made with them but it was said at least four more months would pass before they could be rescued, though essential services could still be provided. The rescues began on October 12, 2010, and all the 33 miners were rescued within 22 hours of first rescue. News of the success of the team led to celebrations around the country and much of the region.

=== China ===
According to one source, in 2003 China accounted for the largest number of coal-mining fatalities, accounting for about 80% of the world's total, although it produced only 35% of the world's coal. Between January 2001 and October 2004, there were 188 accidents that had a death toll of more than 10, about one such accident every 7.4 days. After the 2005 Sunjiawan mine disaster, which killed at least 210 miners, a meeting of the State Council was convened to work on measures to improve work safety in coal mines. The meeting's statement indicated serious problems such as violation of safety standards and overproduction in some coal mines. Three billion yuan (360 million US dollars) were dedicated for technological renovation on work safety, gas management in particular, at state-owned major coal mines. The government also promised to send safety supervision teams to 45 coal mines with serious gas problems and invite colliery safety experts to evaluate safety situations in coal mines and formulate prevention measures.

In 2006, according to the State Work Safety Supervision Administration, 4,749 Chinese coal miners were killed in thousands of blasts, floods, and other accidents. For example, a gas explosion at the Nanshan Colliery killed 24 people on November 13, 2006; the mine was operating without any safety license and the Xinhua News Agency claimed the cause was incorrect usage of explosives. However, the 2006 rate was 20.1% less than 2005 despite an 8.1% increase in production.

The New York Times reported that China's lack of a free press, independent trade unions, citizen watchdog groups and other checks of official power has made cover-ups of mining accidents more possible, even in the Internet age. As a result, Chinese bureaucrats habitually hide scandals (such as mine disasters, chemical spills, the 2003 SARS epidemic, and tainted milk powder) for fear of being held accountable by the ruling Chinese Communist Party or exposing their own illicit deals with companies involved. Under China's authoritarian system, superiors reward subordinates for strict compliance with goals established by authorities, like reducing mine disasters. Indeed, should a mining accident occur, the incentive to hide it is often stronger than the reward for managing it well, as any disaster is almost surely considered a liability.

In November 2009, a mining accident in Heilongjiang killed at least 104 people. It is thought to have been caused by a methane explosion followed by a coal dust explosion. Three top officials involved with the mining company were promptly dismissed.

On August 30, 2012, an explosion killed 45 people at the Xiaojiawan coal mine in Sichuan province. A few days later on September 3, 2012, 14 miners were killed at Gaokeng Coal Mine in Jiangxi province.

On March 29, 2013, a landslide trapped 83 people in the Gyama Mine in Tibet.

On 4 January 2014 The Chinese Government stated that 1,049 people died in the year 2013, down 24 percent from 2012.

On 22 February 2023, China recorded four deaths and 49 missing cases due to collapse of a pit coal mine in vast Inner Mongolia region's Alxa League. Nearly 900 rescuers, including a team from Ministry of Emergency Management, were sent to search for people. General Secretary of the Chinese Communist Party Xi Jinping ordered “all-out efforts in search and rescue” of all people.

On 23 May 2026, Xinhua News Agency reported that a gas explosion at a coal mind located in Shanxi province had killed 82 people, along with 120 people who had been hospitalized.

=== Ecuador ===
About 300 people were killed on May 9, 1993, in the Nambija mine disaster in Ecuador.

On October 15, 2010, shortly after Chile completed its historic, successful rescue of 33 miners who had been stuck underground in the San Jose mine for a record period of nearly 10 weeks, four workers were trapped in an Ecuadoran gold mine following a tunnel collapse. All were confirmed dead by October 20.

=== France ===
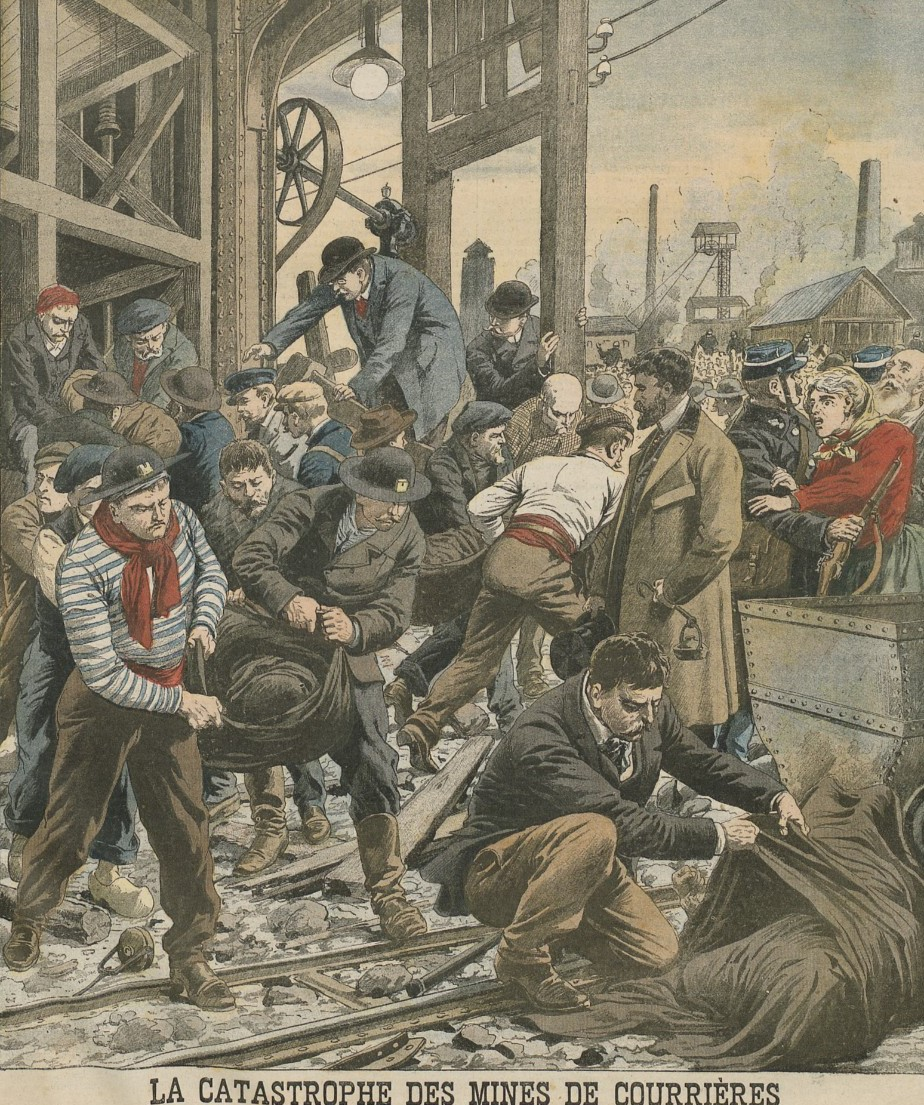
Le Petit Journal illustration of the Courrières mine disaster

The Courrières mine disaster was the worst ever pit mine disaster in Europe. It caused the death of 1,099 miners (including many children) in Northern France on 10 March 1906. It seems that this disaster was surpassed only by the Benxihu Colliery accident in China on April 26, 1942, which killed 1,549 miners. A dust explosion, the cause of which is not known with certainty, devastated a coal mine operated by the Compagnie des mines de houille de Courrières (founded in 1852) between the villages of Méricourt (404 killed), Sallaumines (304 killed), Billy-Montigny (114 killed), and Noyelles-sous-Lens (102 killed) about two kilometres (one mile) to the east of Lens, in the Pas-de-Calais département (about 220 km, or 140 miles, north of Paris).

A large explosion was heard shortly after 06:30 on the morning of Saturday 10 March 1906. An elevator cage at Shaft 3 was thrown to the surface, damaging pit-head workings; windows and roofs were blown out on the surface at Shaft 4; an elevator cage raised at Shaft 2 contained only dead and unconscious miners.

=== India ===
- Burra Dhemo Colliery on 26.9.1956
- Central Bhowrah Colliery on 20.2.1958
- Central Saunda Colliery on 16.9.1976
- Central Saunda Colliery on 15.06.2005
- Chasnalla Colliery on 27.12.1975
- Damua Colliery on 5.1.1960
- Gaslitand Colliery on 26 or 27.9.1995
- Godavarkhani No. 7 LEP on 16.06.2003
- Hurriladih Colliery on 14.9.1983
- Jotejanaki Colliery on 28.6.1913
- Loyabad Colliery on 16.1.1935
- Mahabir Colliery on 13.11.1989
- Majri Colliery on 5.8.1953
- Makerwal Colliery on 6.7.1942
- Newton Chikli Colliery on 10.12.1954
- Phularitand Colliery on 11.07.1912
- Rajpura Dariba Mine VRM disaster on 28.8.1994
- Silewara Colliery on 18.11.1975

=== Japan ===
A number of mine disasters occurred from the 1900s to the 1980s in Japan. The following is a list of only large-scale disasters:

- Hokkaido
  - New Yubari Coal Mine accident, November 1914, 423 fatalities.
  - Hokutan Yubari,
    - April 1912 accident, 276 fatalities.
    - December 1912 accident, 216 fatalities.
    - December 1938 accident, 161 fatalities.
    - October 1981 accident 93 fatalities.
  - South Yubari Coal mine accident, May 1985, 62 fatalities.
  - Bibai coal mine
    - March 1941 accident, 177 fatalities.
    - May 1944 accident, 109 fatalities.
- Honshu
  - Uchigo coal mine caught fire accident in March 1927, 134 fatalities in Iwaki, Fukushima Prefecture
  - East Mizome coal mine seawater inflow accident in April 1915, 235 fatalities in Ube, Yamaguchi Prefecture
  - Chosei coal mine submerged cave accident in February 1942, 183 fatalities in Ube.
- Kyushu
  - Hōjō coal mine explosion in December 1914, 687 fatalities in Miyata, Fukuoka.
  - Hokoku coal mine accidents in Itoda, Fukuoka Prefecture.
    - June 1899 accident, 213 fatalities.
    - July 1907 accident, 365 fatalities.
  - Onoura coal mine accidents in Miyata, Fukuoka Prefecture.
    - November 1909 accident, 243 fatalities.
    - December 1918 accident, 376 fatalities.
    - January 1939 accident, 94 fatalities.
  - 1965 Yamano coal mine accident on June in Maka, Fukuoka, 237 fatalities.
  - 1906 Takashima coal mine explosion on March, 307 fatalities in Nagasaki
  - 1963 Mikawa coal mine accident on November in Fukuoka, 458 fatalities.

=== Netherlands ===
The twelve mines in the Netherlands, four of which were state owned, were considered among the safest in the world, with only three larger accidents occurring during 70 years of mining:

- On 13 July 1928 a methane gas explosion killed 13 miners in the state-owned mine Hendrik in Brunssum.
- On 24 March 1947 13 miners from Staatsmijn Hendrik were killed in a fire caused by an overheated conveyor belt.
- On 3 March 1958 7 miners lost their lives when a cave-in occurred at Staatsmijn Maurits in Geleen.

=== New Zealand ===
The most notable mining accident in New Zealand is the 1896 Brunner Mine disaster, which killed all 65 miners inside. On 19 January 1967, there was an explosion in the Strongman Mine, near Greymouth, on the West Coast. 19 people were killed. On 19 November 2010, there were four explosions over nine days at Pike River mine; 29 miners were killed and two escaped with minor injuries.

=== Niger ===
A gold mine collapse in Maradi Region in 2021, killed dozens.

=== Pakistan (Balochistan) ===
Two coal miners were killed on 24 June 2026 after a coal mine collapsed in the Khost area of Harnai District, Balochistan.

On 30 July 2026, at least 34 miners were killed when a methane gas explosion triggered a mine collapse at a coal mine in Sor-Range, on the outskirts of Quetta.

=== Poland ===
On November 25, 2006, the worst mining disaster occurred in modern Polish history, 23 miners lost their lives at Halemba Coal Mine, a colliery in the town of Ruda Śląska in the southern industrial province of Silesia. A methane explosion at a depth of 1,030 meters caused the November 21 tragedy. The miners were attempting to retrieve €17 million ($US22 million) worth of equipment from a tunnel when a blast caused the shaft to collapse. The tunnel was supposed to have been closed in March due to dangerously high methane concentrations, but was kept active because of the value of the equipment left behind.

=== Russia ===
Several major mining accidents have happened in Russia, particularly the Ulyanovskaya Mine disaster of 2007, which killed at least 106 miners. On January 20, 2013, at least four miners died and four more went missing following an accident at a coal mine in the Kuznetsk Basin, in western Siberia. In November 2021, the Listvyazhnaya mine disaster took place in Listvyazhnaya; many people were trapped.

=== Spain ===
The history of mining in Spain has left a number of major mining accidents with hundreds of victims. The majority of the accidents and casualties have happened in the North of Spain and are particularly related to coal mining, mainly due to the collapse of structures and gas explosions. Though, the worst recorded accident took place in Villanueva del Río, Sevilla, in the Southwest of the country on 28 April 1904, killing 63 people and leaving several more injured.

=== South Africa ===
A number of major mining accidents happened in South Africa including the following accidents:

- 57 deaths on 12 September 1944 at Hlobane Colliery near Vryheid, Kwa-Zulu Natal
- 437 deaths on 21 January 1960 the Coalbrook mining disaster occurred at Coalbrook North colliery. Coalbrook North colliery was one of the underground collieries of Clydesdale (Transvaal) Collieries Limited and was situated near Sasolburg in the Orange Free State province
- 177 killed on 16 September 1986 at the Kinross gold mine in Evander, Mpumalanga.
- 104 deaths on 10 May 1995 at Vaal Reefs number two shaft near Orkney, in the North West.
- 64 deaths on 12 September 1983 at Hlobane Colliery near Vryheid, Kwa-Zulu Natal
- 53 deaths on 13 May 1993 at Middelbult colliery. Middelbult colliery was and is still one of the underground collieries of Sasol Mining situated near the town of Secunda, Mpumalanga

=== Taiwan ===
The three worst mining accidents in Taiwan all happened in 1984:

- On June 20, 1984, in Haishan Coal Mine in Tucheng District, a runaway mining cart struck a high voltage transformer and triggered an explosion. 72 miners died from carbon monoxide poisoning.
- On July 10, 1984, 103 miners died in Meishan Coal Mine in Ruifang District as a result of carbon monoxide poisoning caused by a fire started in the air compressor chamber.
- On December 5, 1984, an explosion occurred at Haishan Coal Mine No. 1 in Sanxia District. 93 miners died from carbon monoxide poisoning with only one survival who was rescued 93 hours after the initial explosion.

=== Tanzania ===
At least 56 miners were killed in April 1998 after heavy rains flooded tanzanite mine shafts. Five people were killed in July 2013 after the tanzanite quarry they were working in the Mererani mining hills collapsed above their heads. A sixth was admitted to hospital in critical condition.

=== Turkey ===
In March 1983, in the Armutçuk coal mine 103 miners died due to a methane gas explosion.

In March 1992 at the TCC Kozla mine, 263 miners were killed due to a firedamp explosion

In 2008 there was another disaster which resulted in one person losing their life. In November 2013, 300 workers barricaded the Zonguldak mine in order to protest the working conditions.

During the year of 2009, in December killed 19 miners due to a methane gas explosion in Bursa Province.

In 2010, there was a mining disaster in Zonguldak Province which resulted in the deaths of 30 workers in a coal mine. The explosion was caused by a firedamp explosion. Previous mining disasters have also occurred here, one in 1992 resulted in the deaths of 270 workers. This was the worst mining disaster until the Soma mine disaster.

In May 2014, in Soma, Manisa there was a major mine collapse caused by an explosion. More than 302 workers lost their lives in the collapse and at least 80 workers were injured.

In October 2022, at least 41 were killed in the 2022 Turkish Mine Explosion in Bartın.

In recent years, the Turkish coal mining industry has had the highest number of fatal accidents per million tons of coal produced. When using the "deaths per million tons of coal production" measure, on any given day, a Turkish coal miner is 360 times more likely to be killed in a Turkish mine than an American coal miner is in an American mine, and 5 times more likely to die from the lax mine safety standards of the Turkish mines than even a Chinese coal miner, whose country places with a distant second in terms of safety related deaths per million tons of coal produced.

=== United Kingdom ===
==== England ====
In England, The Oaks explosion remains the worst mining accident, claiming 388 lives on 12–13 December 1866 near Barnsley in Yorkshire although in the first and main explosion only 340 died, fewer than at the Hulton colliery, but subsequent explosions claimed other lives during the night and the following day. The Hulton Colliery explosion at Westhoughton, Lancashire, in 1910 claimed the lives of 344 miners. An explosion in 1878, at the Wood Pit, Haydock, Lancashire, killed over 200 workers, although only 189 were included in the 'official list'. Another disaster that killed many miners was the Hartley Colliery Disaster, which occurred in January 1862 when the beam of the pumping engine broke suddenly and fell into the single shaft serving the pit. The beam blocked the shaft and entombed hundreds of miners. The final death toll was 204, most of whom were suffocated by the lack of oxygen.

In the metalliferous mines of Cornwall, some of the worst accidents were at East Wheal Rose in 1846, where 39 workers were killed by a sudden flood; at Levant mine in 1919, where 31 were killed and many injured in a failure of the man engine; 12 killed at Wheal Agar in 1883 when a cage fell down a shaft and seven killed at Dolcoath mine in 1893 when a large stull collapsed.

==== Scotland ====
The worst mining accident in Scotland is the 1877 Blantyre mining disaster in Blantyre, Lanarkshire, which claimed 207 lives. Other fatal incidents occurred in the town in 1878 and 1879.

Another serious incident occurred in the small Ayrshire mining village of Knockshinnoch in September 1950. For several tense days rescuers battled bravely against all odds to reach the 129 men trapped deep underground when a field above where they were working caved-in, flooding the mine workings with thick liquid peat, cutting off all means of escape. 116 were rescued but 13 died. A film, The Brave Don't Cry, was made about the disaster in 1952.

The worst Scottish mining disaster in the 20th century took place at Auchengeich by Moodiesburn in September 1959, with 47 men killed. The total surpassed the 40 who had died in flooding at Redding, Falkirk in September 1923.

==== Wales ====
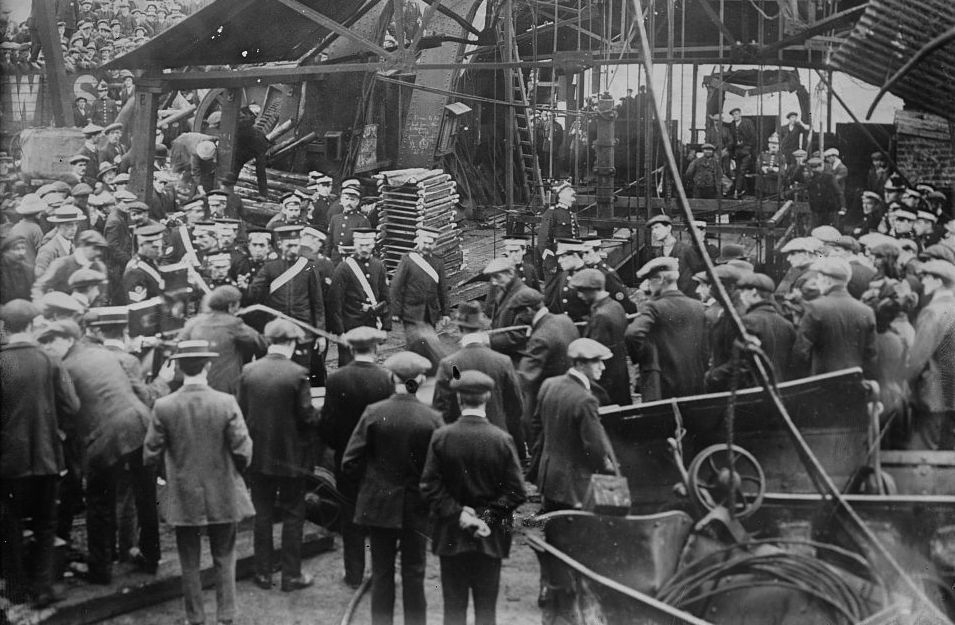
Crowd gathering at the pit head of the Senghenydd Colliery after the explosion in October 1913

During the period 1850 to 1930 the South Wales coalfield had the worst disaster record. This was due to the increasing number of mines being sunk to greater depths into gas-containing strata, combined with poor safety and management practices. As a result, there were nearly forty underground explosions in the Glamorgan and Monmouthshire areas of the coalfield during this time. Each accident resulted in the deaths of twenty or more workers – either directly in the explosion or by suffocation by the poisonous gases formed. The total death toll from these disasters was 3,119 people. The four worst accidents in Wales were:

- 439 deaths at the Senghenydd Colliery Disaster at Universal Colliery in Senghenydd, Glamorgan, in a gas explosion in 1913.
- 290 deaths at the Albion Colliery in Cilfynydd, Glamorgan, in a gas explosion on 25 June 1894.
- 272 deaths at the Prince of Wales Colliery, Abercarn, Monmouthshire, in an explosion of 11 September 1878.
- 266 deaths in the Gresford Disaster near Wrexham in North Wales on 22 September 1934.

Some collieries, e.g. Morfa Colliery, near Port Talbot, Glamorgan, and Black Vein Colliery, Risca, Monmouthshire, suffered three disasters before they were closed for being unsafe.

=== United States ===
The Scofield Mine disaster occurred on May 1, 1900, near Scofield, Utah. At least 200 men died making it the worst mining disaster in the United States at that point.

The Fraterville mine disaster occurred on May 19, 1902, killing 216 miners making it one of the worst in American history. Fraterville is located in western Anderson County, Tennessee. Also in the same year on July 10, 1902, the Rolling Mill Mine Disaster happened in Johnstown, Pa. It killed 112, many of whom had just arrived in town. At the time it was one of the region's most productive mines.

The Monongah Mining Disaster was the worst mining accident of American history; 362 workers were killed in an underground explosion on December 6, 1907, in Monongah, West Virginia.

The Marianna Mine Disaster occurred on November 28, 1908, in a coal mine near Marianna, Pennsylvania resulting in the death of 154 men from the explosion. The explosion occurred during shift change, as men entered the mine before the previous shift had left. Consequently, the mine contained many more miners than usual. Another accident occurred in the same mine on September 23, 1957, when an explosion killed 6 of 11 men in the mine.

The Cross Mountain Mine disaster occurred on December 9, 1911, near the community of Briceville, Tennessee, killing 84 miners.

The First Dawson Disaster was a mining accident on October 22, 1913, in Dawson, New Mexico in which 263 men died (146 were Italian and 36 were Greek).

The Second Dawson Disasters was a mining accident on February 8, 1923, in Dawson, New Mexico in which 123 men died.

The Speculator Mine Disaster occurred in the copper mines of Butte, Montana on June 8, 1917. An electric cable being lowered into the mine was accidentally ignited at 2,500 feet below the surface. The fire quickly climbed the cable, in turn igniting the shaft. The shaft thus became a chimney, eliminating the mine's primary source of oxygen. Nearly all of the 168 fatalities were due to asphyxia. It remains the deadliest underground hard rock mining event in American history.

The Hastings mine explosion was a fire at the Victor-American Fuel Company coal mine in Hastings, Las Animas Country, Colorado, On April 27, 1917, in which 121 people died.

The Cherry Mine disaster was a fire in the Cherry, Illinois, coal mine in 1909, and surrounding events, in which 259 men and boys died.

The Millfield Mine Disaster 1930 in Ohio killed 82 men.

From 1880 to 1910, mine accidents claimed thousands of fatalities. Where annual mining deaths had numbered more than 1,000 a year during the early part of the 20th century, they decreased to an average of about 500 during the late 1950s, and to 93 during the 1990s. In addition to deaths, many thousands more are injured (an average of 21,351 injuries per year between 1991 and 1999), but overall there has been a downward trend of deaths and injuries.

In 1959, the Knox Mine Disaster occurred in Port Griffith, Pennsylvania. The swelling Susquehanna River collapsed into a mine under it and resulted in 12 deaths. In Plymouth, Pennsylvania, the Avondale Mine Disaster of 1869 resulted in the deaths of 108 miners and two rescue workers after a fire in the only shaft eliminated the oxygen in the mine. Federal laws for mining safety resulted from this disaster. Pennsylvania suffered another disaster in 2002 at Quecreek, 9 miners were trapped underground and subsequently rescued after 78 hours. During 2006, 72 miners died at work, 47 by coal mining. The majority of these fatalities occurred in Kentucky and West Virginia, including the Sago Mine Disaster. On April 5, 2010, in the Upper Big Branch Mine disaster an underground explosion caused the deaths of 29 miners. The Mine Safety and Health Administration recorded 8 coal mining deaths in the United States in 2025.

The U.S. Bureau of Mines was created in 1910 to investigate accidents, advise industry, conduct production and safety research, and teach courses in accident prevention, first aid, and mine rescue. The Federal Coal Mine Health and Safety Acts of 1969 and 1977 set further safety standards for the mining. Since the closure of the U.S. Bureau of Mines in 1996, this research function has been carried on by the National Institute for Occupational Safety and Health (NIOSH). NIOSH maintains a list of mine disasters which occurred in the United States since 1839.

=== Venezuela ===
On 21 February 2024, fourteen people were killed and eleven injured following the collapse of an illegal gold mine in Angostura Municipality, Bolívar.
