= Scofield Mine disaster =

1900 explosion of a coal mine in Utah

The Scofield Mine disaster occurred at the Winter Quarters coal mine on May 1, 1900, near Scofield, Utah. The mine was located at 39°42′57″N 111°11′17″W. The disaster killed least 200 men, with some rescuers placing the death toll as high as 246. There was confusion about the death count, as at least one body was discovered only in August, 1900.

Some were killed outright by a dust explosion, but most died of asphyxiation by whitedamp and afterdamp. It was the worst mining accident to that point in American history, measured by deaths.

== Cause ==
Watch belonging to William Clark Sr., which stopped at the time of his death during the disaster; on display at the Museum of Utah

The State Mine Inspector's Report determined ten 25-pound kegs of black powder detonated in the Number 4 Section. This ignited coal dust which spread throughout Number 4 with explosive force killing the miners, and igniting another 20 scattered kegs of powder. The explosion blew up the fan used to ventilate Number 4. One of the deceased carried a pocketwatch which had stopped at 10:28 am during the explosion.

However in Number 1 mine, which was connected to other sections, the fan continued to run and pulled the remnants of the explosion, including afterdamp (primarily carbon monoxide) into Number 1. When the miners inside Number 1 felt the explosion they tried to escape through the most direct route, which happened to be through Number 4. Unaware of where the explosion originated they walked directly into the poisonous gas, and were overcome and killed. Many workers were too far into the mine to escape.

== Aftermath ==
Over the next two days many people from the towns of Clear Creek and Scofield worked to remove the bodies and care for the dead and wounded. Most of the bodies from Number 4 were burned and mutilated and had to be placed in sacks whereas those killed by gas were loaded into coal carts by the dozen to be hauled out of the mine. The bodies were taken to the company boarding house to be cleaned up and dressed. They were then taken to the school house, where families anxiously waited to claim their husbands and sons. Many of the dead were laid to rest on May 5, 1900, during two large funerals. Every family in the town of Scofield was affected. The disaster left 107 widows and 268 fatherless children. In order to bury all of the dead, 75 caskets had to be imported from Denver, Colorado, because only 125 caskets could be brought in from Salt Lake City.135 graves were dug at the Scofield cemetery, some of which were widened to hold fathers and sons. Funeral trains with more than 51 coffins carried the remaining miners to other locations for burial. Sixty-one of the dead were Finnish Americans. The elderly Luoma family, who had arrived from Finland just three months earlier, lost six sons and three grandsons. One 18-year-old bride lost her father, both brothers, and husband.

At the time, the Winter Quarters Mine explosion was the country's worst mining disaster; it now ranks fifth. President William McKinley sent a wire, expressing "... my intense sorrow upon learning of the terrible calamity which has occurred at Scofield, and my deep sympathy with the wives, children and friends of the unfortunate victims of the explosion."

The disaster led to a strike the following year and to calls for better safety in coal mines and better treatment of mine workers.

One man, one of six Evans brothers working at the mine that day, went through the Abercarn colliery disaster in Wales in 1878, when 268 miners had been killed. He reported that "the scenes [at Abercarn] were tame compared with [Scofield]." Two of his brothers were killed. They were "professional musicians, and natives of Wales. They have taken prizes at all musical events in this locality." A local writer praised Richard T. Evans as "the sweetest singer in Israel."

The Pleasant Valley Coal Company discontinued its operations in 1928. Other coal mines continue to operate in the area. In Scofield, Utah, there is now a memorial for those who died.

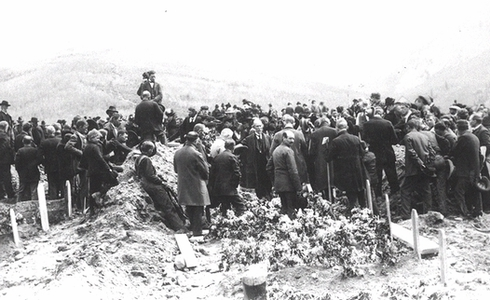
Grave dedication

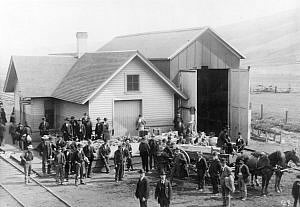
Additional coffins waiting for transport to disaster site

== In other media ==
The explosion is a prominent element in the Carla Kelly novel My Loving Vigil Keeping (2012).

== See also ==
- List of coal mining disasters
