= English Baptist Church, Abercarn =

Grade II-listed Baptist church in Abercarn, Wales

Coordinates: 51.6405°N 3.1311°W

English Baptist Church
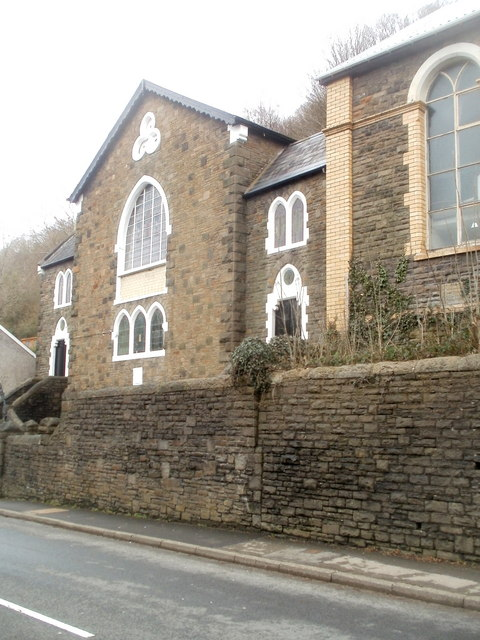
- English Baptist Church
- Location: Abercarn
- Country: Wales
- Denomination: Baptist chapel

Architecture
- Heritage designation: Grade II
- Designated: 17 December 1998
- Architectural type: Chapel

The English Baptist Church is a Grade II-listed Baptist church in the town of Abercarn, Caerphilly, Wales. It was built in the mid-nineteenth century to give the Baptists a church of their own. The building was extensively remodelled later in the century.

== History ==
Baptism had a history in Abercarn that dated back to 1750 when a local ironmaster, John Griffiths, converted. Regular meetings began in 1808 in various places and the congregation was formally established in 1847. Construction of the church began in 1856 to a design by Ebenezer Rogers and it was completed the following year for a cost of almost £1,000. Initially there was no pastor, but only Revivalist preaching until 1862. A daughter chapel was built in 1873 that had Welsh-language services, while the original church used English and was known as the Lower Baptist Chapel Abercarn. The chapel's pastor, Rev. Probert, led the local response to the Abercarn colliery disaster in 1878. The chapel was extensively remodelled beginning in 1882 that included levelling the ground floor, the insertion of galleries, a new pulpit and seating and the addition of a harmonium. A new external vestibule was also added; the total cost coming to £1,050. The addition of a pipe organ in 1917 by J.J. Binns required further modifications to the front of the building. The chapel was Grade II-listed on 17 December 1998 "as a prominent mid C.19 chapel with later C.19 remodelling retaining almost all its historic fabric. Group value with the Sunday School."

== Notes ==
The Caretaker during the early 1920s was Hannah Eliza Sheen later known as Hannah Eliza Little
