= Giroux mining accidents =

Mining accidents

Giroux Mining Accidents
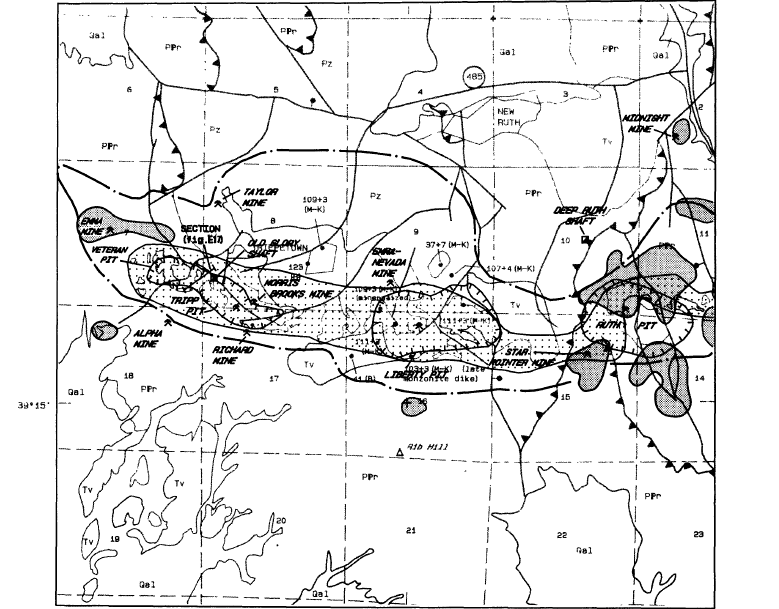
- Ely, Nevada mines
- Date: Collapse 4 December 1907; Fire 24 August 1911
- Location: Ely, Nevada; Collapse 39.2586°N 115.0351°W Fire 39.2635°N 115.0262°W
- Type: Copper mine disaster
- Cause: Collapse; Fire
- Deaths: 2; 7

The Giroux Consolidated Company experienced two mining accidents at a copper mine in Ely, Nevada, one on December 4, 1907, and another on August 24, 1911.

In the 1907 collapse 2 men were killed and 4 other men were trapped 1000 feet down in a mining shaft for 46 days. In the 1911 fire at the Giroux mine 7 men were killed and two others were badly injured.

== 1907 Giroux mine collapse ==
The mine was owned by the Giroux Consolidated Company. Four men became trapped 1000 feet down in the Alpha Shaft of the Giroux mine when the earth caved in. They tapped on a pipe to let others know that they were trapped in the collapse. Food and water were sent down each day. The food, water and air the trapped men needed all came through a 6-inch pipe.

The mine owners hired diggers to work in four hour shifts. The diggers were paid $5 each and the mine owners said the total cost was $200 per day.

The men were finally rescued January 20, 1908 after 47 days underground.

== 1911 Giroux mine fire ==
On August 24, 1911, there was a fire at the Giroux mine in Alpha 2 shaft. The miners were 1400 feet down in the shaft of the Giroux mine when an explosion of a barrel of oil caused a fire above the men in the elevator shaft. The men decided to ride the cage elevator through the flames. The men were all burned very badly. 7 men were killed and 3 were injured

When the elevator reached the top men rushed to the cage to attend to the wounded. The smoke prevented the rescue. The cage was raised 25 feet above the shaft and several of the miners were saved.

The mine was repaired by February 1912, and mining activities resumed.

== See also ==
- Mining accidents
- Mining in the United States
