= Risca colliery disasters =

Series of mine explosions in Wales

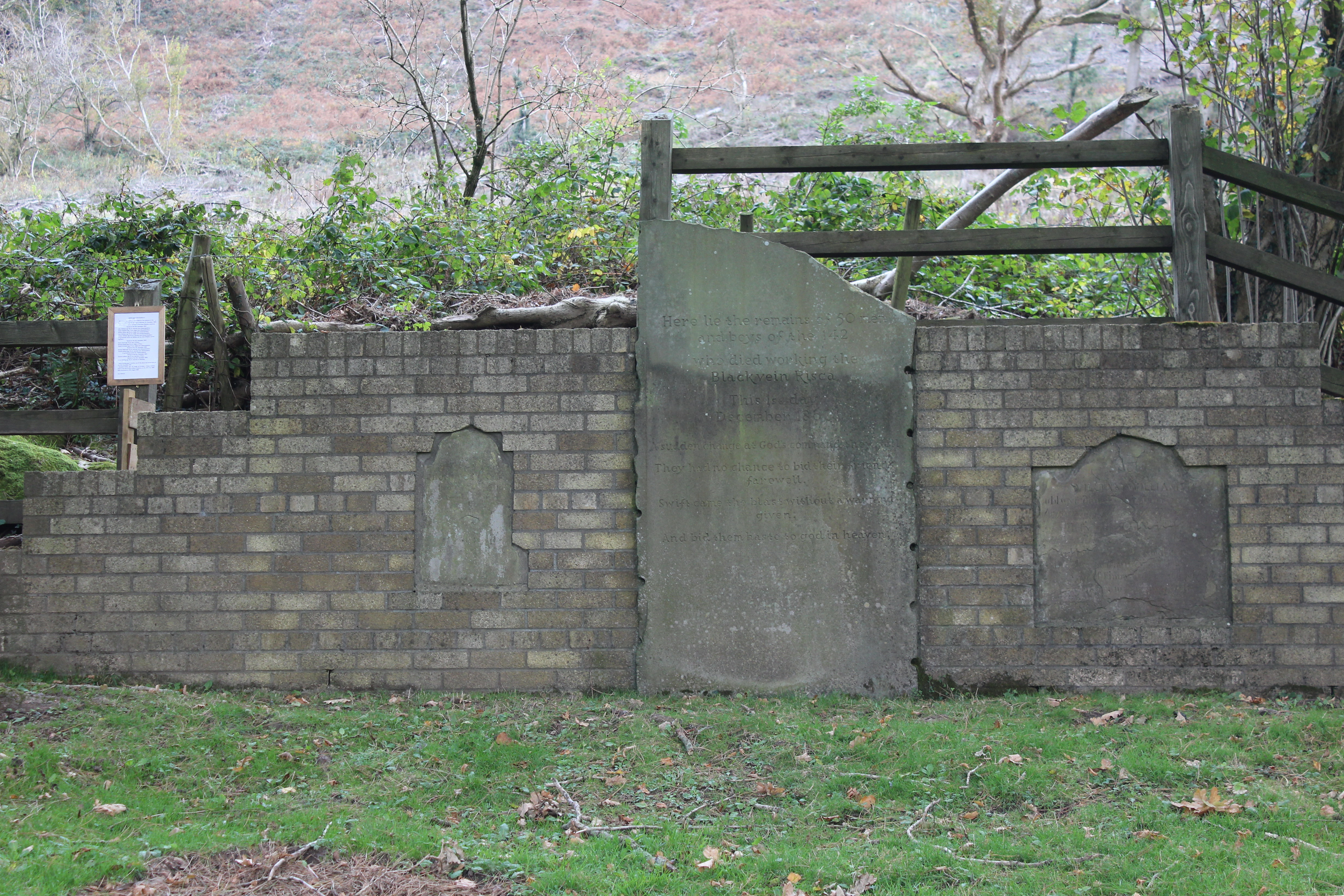
Plaques commemorating miners buried at Cwm Byr

The Risca colliery disasters were a series of catastrophic mine explosions near the Welsh town of Risca (then in the county of Monmouthshire) in the nineteenth century. The most serious of these were in 1860 when more than 140 died in the Black Vein colliery and in 1880 when 120 died at the New Risca colliery.

Although these were not amongst the most serious mine disasters in the Welsh coalfield, they were some of earliest large-scale pit disasters in the nineteenth century and along with the Abercarn colliery disaster of 1878 represented a total loss of life between 1842 and 1880 of more than 580 lives.

The main disasters in Risca attracted nationwide press coverage and resulted in official inquiries to determine the causes of the accidents.

== Background ==
The Black Vein Colliery was opened in the early 1840s by John Russell of the Risca Iron and Coal Company, employing more than 350. By 1842 the Black Vein colliery was already gaining a reputation as being accident prone with 3 colliers dying from an explosion of firedamp. Accidents and deaths happened so regularly that it became known as being one of the most dangerous in the coalfield.

== 1846 explosion ==
The first explosion causing large numbers of deaths at Black Vein was in January 1846.

Local newspapers reported that around 150 men were working in different sides of the mine workings, but the explosion only affected one area. Miners working elsewhere were not aware of any noise but just felt a strong current of air. 35 were killed; 4 burned, 30 suffocated and 1 was hit by a carriage at the bottom of the shaft.

The coroners court, held at the Albert Inn in Risca in February 1846, found that the cause of death was by an accidental explosion. A further inquest decided that the explosion was caused by the miners using naked candles and poor ventilation. Mine inspectors also cited the relative inexperience of miners who had recently arrived from Gloucestershire, Somerset and Wiltshire. It was said that out of the 35 who died, only one was Welsh and he had been reluctant to continue working as he thought an accident was inevitable.

It was also reported that there had been a series of mishaps and the coalface had not been properly checked when work began. The dayshift fireman was sick so instead his brother was sent to check the mine. He was said to have been using his coat to beat out the gas when the explosion occurred.

6 of the victims were aged 11–14, 16 were aged 19–29 and 8 were aged 30–46.

== 1853 explosion ==
Another explosion in March 1853 occurred at the entrance to No.13 about half a mile from the bottom of the pit.

7 people initially died - two boys of 12 and 13, one of 16 and the rest in their early 20s.

Three other men survived the explosion but died later. A coroner's inquest subsequently found that one of the men who initially survived was responsible for the explosion due to the use of a naked candle rather than a safety lamp and that a ventilation door had been left open.

== 1860 explosion ==
In the morning of the 1 December 1860, a large explosion ripped through the Black Vein pit killing more than 140.

== 1880 explosion ==
By 1872 the colliery had changed ownership several times and a new pit, with much deeper shafts, was sunk to extract more of the coal in the Black Vein between the (more modern) villages of Crosskeys and Wattsville.

A change to three shifts and extraction methods had worried the miners, who believed that the face moved forwards too fast and that gas was not being dispersed sufficiently.

A watch found on one of the bodies had stopped at 1.30 am, showing the time of the explosion.

In the middle of the night of 15 July 1880, a large explosion in the New Risca colliery killed more than 120.
