= Kinross mining disaster =

1985 mine fire in South Africa with 177 fatalities

Kinross Mining Disaster
- Date: 16 September 1986
- Location: Kinross, Transvaal, South Africa (now Kinross, Mpumalanga, South Africa)
- Casualties: 177 dead and 235 injured

The Kinross mine disaster (16 September 1986) resulted in the deaths of 177 miners and the injury of 235 others, making it one of the largest mining incidents in South Africa.

The disaster occurred at the Kinross gold mine when welding set alight an acetylene cylinder. The tunnel walls were lined with a polyurethane foam coating to prevent water seepage, which caught alight, along with plastic wire coverings, releasing toxic fumes that suffocated the miners.

After the disaster, the National Union of Mineworkers (NUM) complained about low safety standards in the mines. Workers disrupted a memorial service sponsored by the mine owners, objecting to the exclusion of miner representatives from the event, and staged a day of protests on 1 October 1986 with workers striking to hold memorial services to mourn those who died in the accident.

Other South African mine accidents that killed a large number of people include the 1960 Coalbrook mining disaster, with 437 fatalities, the Vaal Reefs mining disaster, in 1995, which killed 104 mine workers, and the Trans-Natal Colliery methane gas explosion, killing 39.
