= 2014 Zenica mine disaster =

2014 mining accident in Zenica, Bosnia

- Raspotočje Mine (Bosnia and Herzegovina)
- Date: 4 September 2014
- Time: 4:30 PM CET (03:30 UTC)
- Location: Raspotočje Mine Zenica, Bosnia and Herzegovina; 44°11′16″N 17°55′52″E
- Also known as: Raspotočje mine disaster
- Deaths: 5
- Injuries: 29

The 2014 Zenica mine disaster was a mining accident that occurred on 4 September 2014 at the coal mine "Raspotočje" in Zenica, Bosnia and Herzegovina.

== Background ==
After a 3.5 Richter-scale earthquake hit Zenica on 4 September 2014, causing a rock burst in the coal mine "Raspotočje", 34 miners remained trapped inside the mine. All miners were trapped more than 500 meters below the surface, but were provided with fresh air.

== Casualties ==
Out of the 34 miners trapped inside the mine, 5 died, while the remaining 29 sustained minor injuries.
