= Hlobane Coal Mine Disaster (1944) =

- Date: 12 September 1944
- Location: Hlobane, Natal, South Africa; 27.710286°S 30.998380°E
- Cause: Methane explosion
- Deaths: 57
- Injuries: 6

A methane explosion killed 57 miners at the Hlobane Colliery, Natal, South Africa on 12 September 1944. During drilling of a dyke in a coal seam, methane built up during the night due to insufficient ventilation in the mine.

The explosion was said to have been caused by a miner relighting his lamp. He was in charge of monitoring the methane levels and its high levels had extinguished his lamp. The explosion resulted in the deaths of 57 miners and six serious injuries.

On the 39th anniversary of the explosion in 1983, a similar explosion killed 68 miners at the same mine.
