= Rajpura Dariba Mine VRM disaster =

The Rajpura Dariba Mine VRM disaster took place in Dariba, Udaipur, India on 28 August 1994 at a mine operated by Hindustan Zinc Ltd.

== History ==
The slurry from a VRM stope where cemented fill could not settle broke through the plug made below the stope. The shaft was undergoing a second phase of deepening. A plug was placed in the shaft to separate the old operating portion from the new construction. The slurry got stuck over this shaft plug. Material accumulated for until the weight overwhelmed the plug. The accumulated material flowed through the haulage level and took the shortest path via the main shaft into the mine. All 13 miners in the mine drowned.

== Stope ==
A stope of about 50 meters horizontal length X 25 to 50 meters width X 50 meters vertical depth was excavated. This stope area was drilled completely from the top of stope throughout its height of 50 meter using long drill hole machines. At the bottom of the stope sufficient area is cleared to draw out muck. The stope is blasted in slices of about 5 meter or so using explosives. Blasted muck is withdrawn using an LHD machine. After blasting, a barricade plug is placed at the bottom of the stope from which muck is withdrawn. This barricade plug has a draw out pipe fitted at the bottom with a V notch for proper decantation and monitoring. This empty stope is now equipped with long decantation pipes to be lowered from the top of the stopes. The empty stope is filled with cement fill. Water is drained from the bottom of the stope, and the fill gradually solidifies.

== Possible cause ==
The collapse was clearly due to non-solidification. Decantation is the first step for proper solidification. 8000 m3 of material with maximum head of 50 meter remaining in slurry form for days together indicate lack of decantation, which can be due to deficient installation of decantation equipment and/or monitoring system. 15 stopes had already been filled successfully, indicating sufficient experience and reliability of method and equipment used. Nobody noticed that 50 meter of filling slurry head had been created inside the stope over days/months. Lack of notifications of non solidification points toward an inadequate alarm system.

== See also ==
- National Geographic Seconds From Disaster episodes
