= Staatsmijn Hendrik =

Coal mine in Rumpen, Brunssum, Limburg, Netherlands

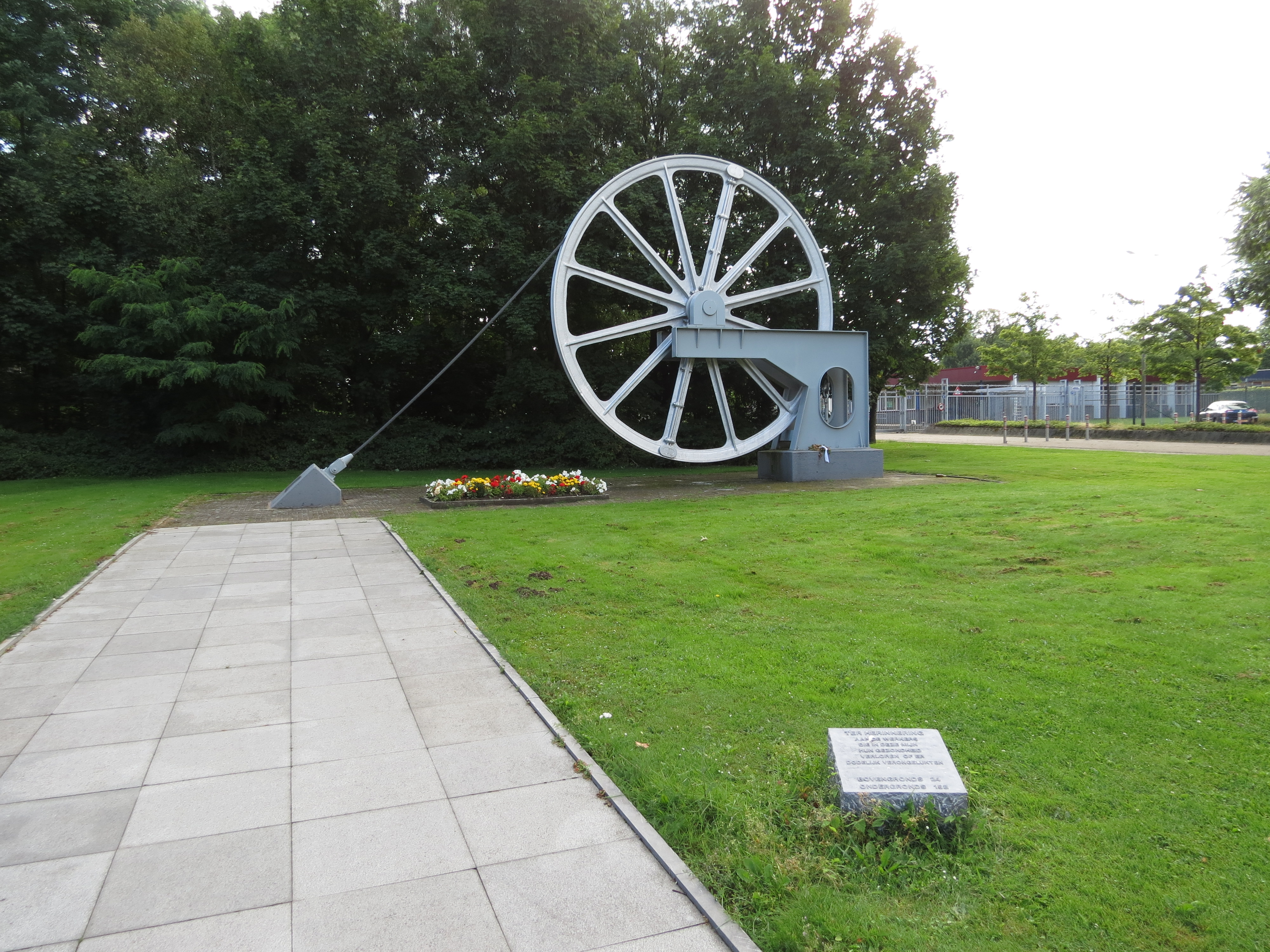
- Monument for mining casualties

- Location within Netherlands
- Location: Rumpen, Brunssum, Limburg, Netherlands; 50°56′20″N 5°58′1″E
- Products: Coal
- Production: 61,203,000 tonnes
- Opened: 1911
- Closed: 1963
- Company: DSM

The Dutch State Mine (DSM) Hendrik, in Dutch Staatsmijn Hendrik, was a coal mine located in Brunssum. It was run by the Dutch state through its company DSM. The mine was in operation from 1915 until 1963, when it was integrated with DSM Emma. DSM Hendrik was named after Queen Wilhelmina's husband Henry of Mecklenburg-Schwerin.

The mine had four shafts. Shaft number 3 was a ventilation shaft on the Brunssummerheide near Nieuwenhagen. Shaft number 4 was the deepest at 1,058 metres (3,471 ft). Total production was 61.2 megatons of gas-rich coal that was used to produce coke.

== NATO headquarters ==
In 1967 when the mine was closed, the buildings were used to house the headquarters of the Allied Forces Central Europe (AFCENT). In 2012 this changed into the Allied Joint Force Command Brunssum, which still uses the site in 2023. Its facilities include a tax-free shop, a film theatre and sports facilities. Additional services are provided by the AAFES on US Army Garrison Brunssum.
