= Benxihu Colliery =

Historic mine in Benxi, Liaoning, China

Coordinates: 41°19′40″N 123°46′25″E

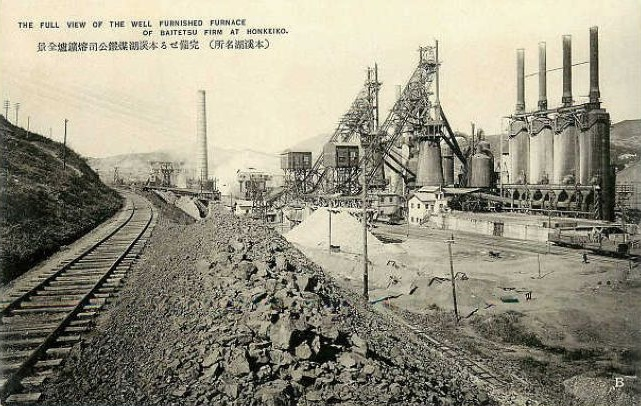
The machine of Benxihu Coal and Iron Co., Ltd

Benxihu (Honkeiko) Colliery (simplified Chinese: 本溪湖煤矿; traditional Chinese: 本溪湖煤礦) was a coal mine in Benxi, Liaoning, China, first mined in 1905. Originally an iron and coal mining project under joint Japanese and Chinese control, the mine came under predominantly Japanese control. In the early 1930s, Japan invaded the northeast of China, and Liaoning province became part of the Japanese-controlled puppet state of Manchukuo. During the Second Sino-Japanese War, the Japanese forced Chinese labourers—some of whom had been captured from local military organizations—to work the colliery under very poor conditions. Food was scarce and workers did not have sufficient clothing. Working conditions were harsh, and diseases such as typhoid and cholera flourished due to poor sanitation and water supplies. Typically, miners worked 12-hour shifts or longer. The Japanese controllers were known to beat workers with pick handles, and the perimeter of the mine was fenced and guarded. Many describe the conditions as slave labour.

== Coal dust explosion ==
On April 26, 1942, a gas and coal-dust explosion in the mine sent flames bursting from the mine shaft entrance. Miners' relatives rushed to the site but were denied entry by a cordon of Japanese guards, who erected electric fences to keep them out. In an attempt to curtail the fire underground, the Japanese shut off the ventilation and sealed the pit head. Witnesses say that the Japanese did not evacuate the pit fully before sealing it, trapping many Chinese workers underground to suffocate in the smoke. The Soviet Union later investigated and blamed the actions of the Japanese for needlessly increasing the death toll.

It took workers ten days to remove all the corpses and rubble from the shaft. The dead were buried in a mass grave nearby. Many victims could not be properly identified due to the extent of the burns. The Japanese at first reported the death toll to be 34. Initial newspaper reports were short, as few as 40 words, and downplayed the scale of the disaster, characterizing it as a minor event. Later the Japanese erected a monument to the dead. This stone gave the number of dead as 1,327. The true number is believed to be 1,549, 34% of the miners working that day. It was the worst disaster in the history of coal mining and the second-worst recorded industrial accident. Of this number, 31 fatalities were Japanese; the remaining 1,518 were Chinese.

The Japanese continued to operate the mine until the end of World War II, in 1945, when they were defeated and forced to withdraw from China. Following the Japanese withdrawal, the Chinese workers took control of the site. With the liberation after the war, the Soviet Union investigated the accident. They found that only some of the workers died directly from the gas and coal-dust explosion. Most deaths were from carbon monoxide poisoning produced when the Japanese closed the ventilation and sealed the pit head after the initial explosion.

== See also ==
- Coal in China
