= Hlobane Coal Mine Disaster (1983) =

South African industrial accident

- Date: 12 September 1983
- Location: Hlobane, Natal, South Africa; 27.710286°S 30.998380°E
- Cause: Methane explosion
- Deaths: 68

A methane explosion occurred at the Hlobane Colliery, Natal, South Africa on 12 September 1983, killing 68 miners. The disaster occurred on the 39th anniversary of a similar explosion in 1944 where 57 miners were killed at the same mine.

== Background ==
On 12 September 1983, 80 miners were working underground at the coal mine. Two sections of a horizontal seam cut 6 km into a mountainside was being mined when an explosion occurred. Sixty-four work were killed initially and four badly burnt miners were helicoptered to the Chamber of Mines Hospital in Johannesburg but later died later of their injuries. Twelve workers escaped the mine uninjured. Mine Manager Jurie Blom claimed that the accident was caused by the build-up of methane due to poor ventilation over the weekend and ignited by machinery. The mine, owned by the Iron and Steel Corporation, resumed operations later in the day when miners were "persuaded" to go back down the mine.

== Inquest findings ==
The inquest found that several regulations of the Mines and Works Act had been ignored, with a lawyer for the deceased highlighting twenty-one ignored regulations. The mines ventilation officer, P. Shand, acknowledged that the mine faces were not ventilated by sufficient amounts of air as stipulated by regulations and even months after the event, were still not being met. He would claim this was the case with most coal mines in Natal. Like the 1944 explosion, the miners were mining through a dyke and special precautions should have been taken due to a methane build-up.

Only fourteen of twenty-nine pieces of machinery had been "fireproofed" to prevent accidental sparks. The inquest court believed that a coal scoop was probably the cause of the ignition and explosion.

A build-up in methane had been noticed by miner T.J. Bezuidenhout a week prior to the explosion and he had spent most of his shift getting rid of it. He reported the occurrence to his supervisors and his report was annotated by them to the effect that he had made up the methane report to cover-up poor production. He would die in the explosion the following week. Not enough safety lamps used to trace methane were issued and were insufficiently supplied with tubes to capture the methane for testing. Subsequent deaths after the methane explosion were caused by coal dust igniting that had not been watered down due to insufficient water supply and the non-fireproof brattice cloth.

== Conclusion ==
In December 1983, the South African Chamber of Mines agreed to allow the National Union of Mineworkers to be represented on its Prevention of Accidents Committee.
