= Brookwood mine disaster =

2001 disaster in Alabama, US

Coordinates: 33.28669°N 87.31114°W

The Brookwood Mine Disaster occurred on September 23, 2001 at the Jim Walter Resources No. 5 coal mine in Brookwood, roughly 40 miles southwest of Birmingham, Alabama. The Mine Safety and Health Administration report indicates that at 5:15 PM, a cave-in caused the release of methane gas, resulting in two subsequent explosions. The incident caused the deaths of 13 miners. One thousand five hundred people attended the related funeral. The MSHA initially fined the company $435,000 but subsequent court action reduced this to only $5,000. A grants program was subsequently established named after the disaster and the 2006 Sago Mine Disaster.
