= White Ash Mine disaster =

Coordinates: 39°45′7″N 105°13′37″W

- Date: 9 September 1889
- Time: About 16:00
- Location: Golden, Colorado
- Cause: Flooding
- First reporter: Engineer Charles Hoagland, and Foreman Evan Jones
- Deaths: Ten

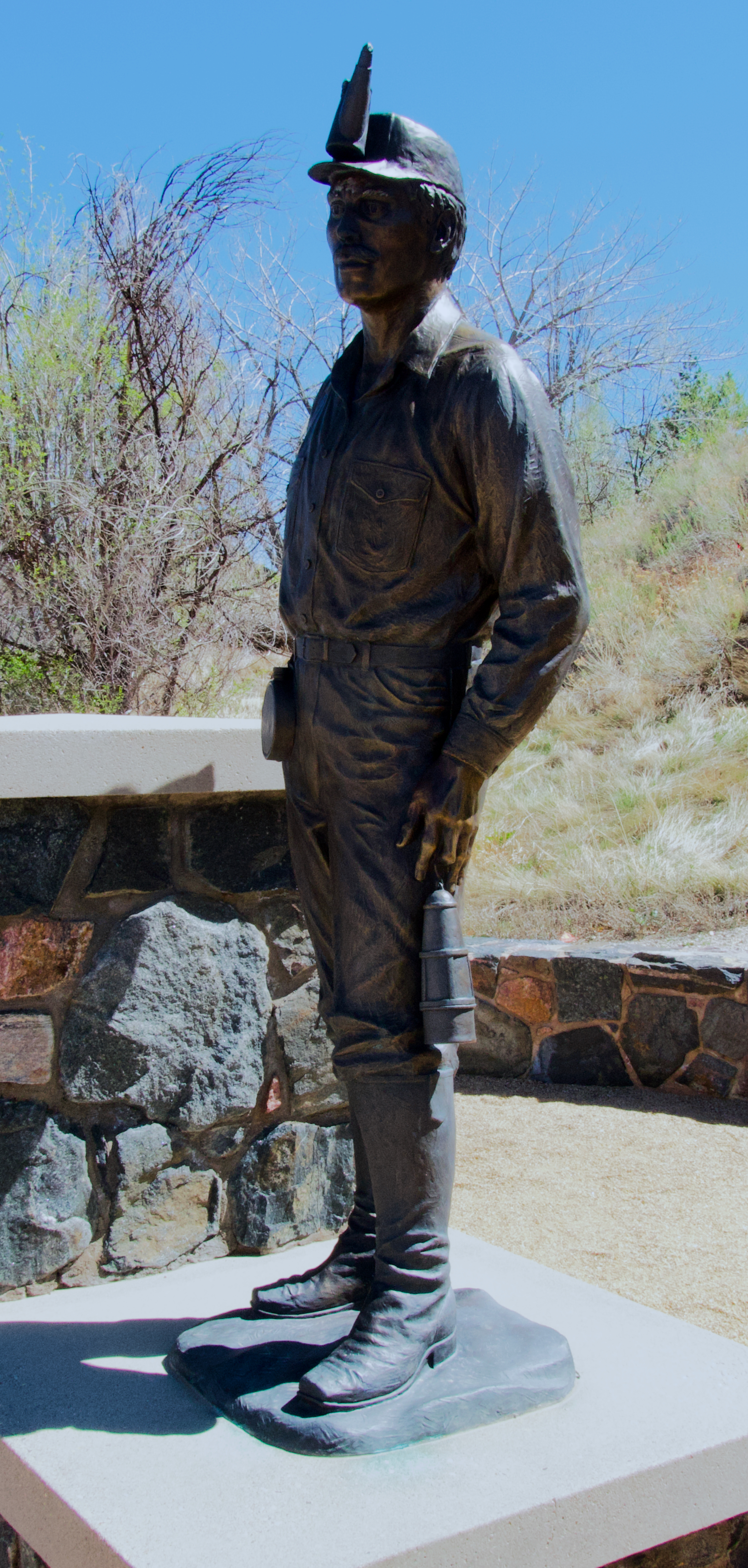
This statue at the memorial honors the ten miners who died in the disaster.

The White Ash Mine disaster occurred on 9 September 1889 at the White Ash Mine, an underground coal mine in Golden, Colorado. Ten men who had been working at the end of the lowest level were killed when the mine was accidentally flooded. Their bodies were never recovered and the mine was abandoned. It is likely that the flood was caused by a fire that weakened a barrier between the White Ash Mine and a nearby abandoned mine that was known to be flooded.

== Background ==
The White Ash Mine, which opened in 1862, became one of the most extensive early coal mines in Colorado. It produced coal for use in Golden, in Denver to the east, and at gold and silver mines in the Rocky Mountains to the west. It worked a near-vertical coal seam near the base of the Laramie Formation that ranged from 6 to 8 feet (1.8 to 2.4 metres) thick. A vertical shaft was sunk in rock west of the seam, and horizontal cross-cuts were driven from the shaft to reach the seam, after which horizontal levels were driven within the coal itself. By the end of 1880, the mine employed forty men and was producing about 100 short tons (91 tonnes) of coal per day.

The Loveland Mine, which lay a short distance to the north, had worked the same coal seam. By the time of the disaster it had been abandoned and was known to be filled with water.

== Flooding ==
At about 4:00 in the afternoon on 9 September 1889 the White Ash Mine was accidentally flooded from the abandoned Loveland Mine. At that time there were 10 men working in the lowest level of the White Ash Mine at a depth of about 730 ft (220 m) below the surface. The engineer realized that there was a problem when he tried to send the cage down the shaft but it didn't reach the bottom and none of his signals were answered. When he attempted to raise the cage he found that it was stuck. The foreman climbed down a ladder to the 280 Foot Level where he "heard a great roaring, and knew that the mine was flooded". He then hurried to the Loveland Mine and saw that the water was gone.

The foreman again attempted to enter the White Ash Mine but was turned back by gas. Air was pumped into the mine throughout the night, but by morning the men were presumed to have been drowned beneath 200 feet (61 meters) of water. It was not possible to recover the bodies because the volume of water in the mine exceeded the capacity of the available pumps.

== Cause ==
According to the State Inspector of Coal Mines, the 280 Foot Level of the White Ash Mine had previously been on fire. He believed that the fire had been smothered when the 280 Level had been sealed off, and that there were 70 to 100 feet (21 to 30 metres) of wall remaining to separate it from the flooded Loveland Mine. It was likely, however, that the fire had continued to eat away at the wall until it failed.

"One of the upper levels of the White Ash, which if protracted would have made connection with the lowest seam in the Loveland, has for a long time been on fire, and it is supposed that this at last burned through into the Loveland, letting in the water, which ran down the White Ash shaft and drowned the men working in the levels below."

The Inspector noted that a mine dump on the surface was also on fire and, alternatively, that fire might have worked its way down into the barrier.

== Aftermath ==
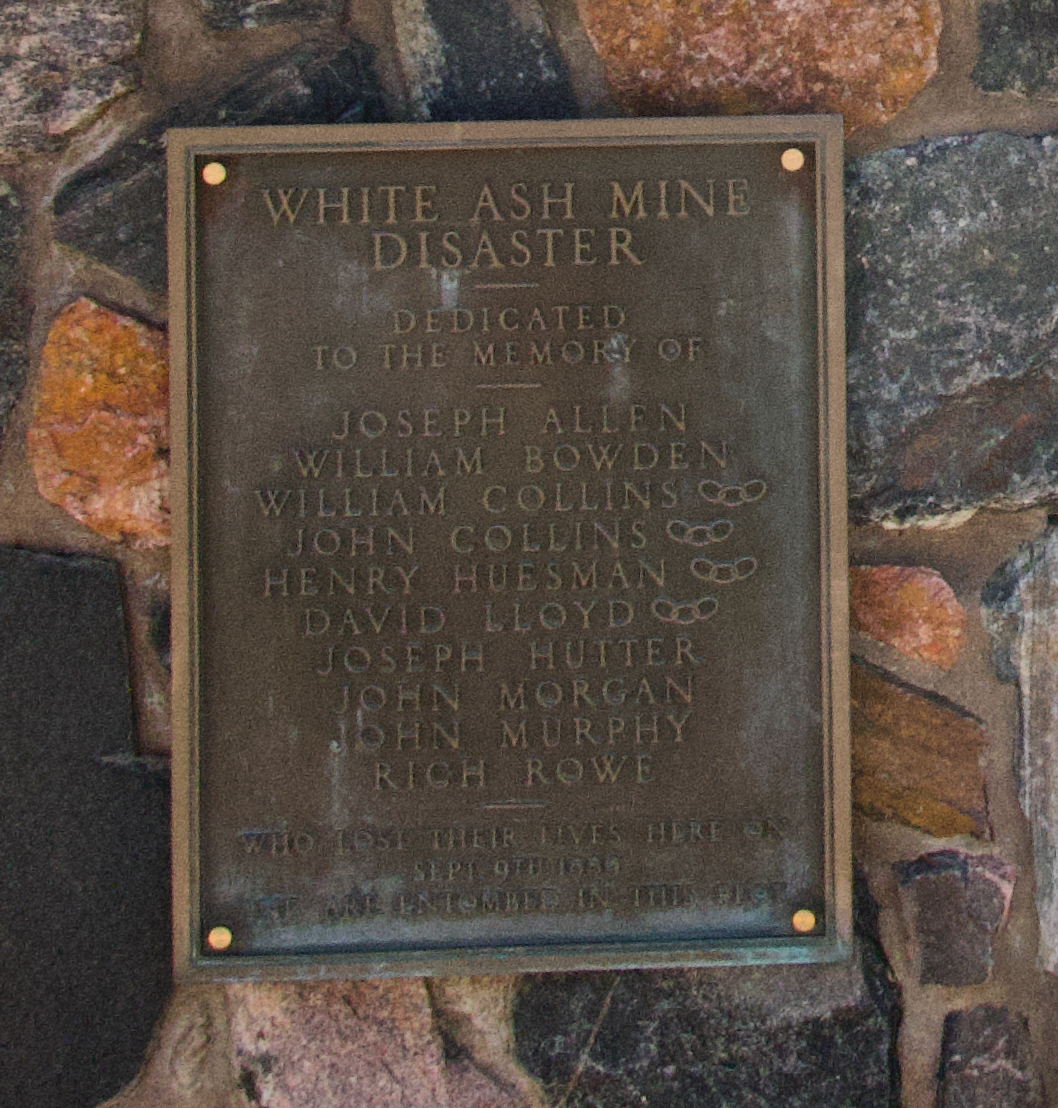
In 1936, this marker was mounted on a boulder and placed near the site of the White Ash mine shaft at the west end of 12th Street in Golden, Colorado. The marker was remounted during a renovation of the memorial in 2016.

The White Ash Mine was abandoned after the flood and the bodies of the ten miners were never recovered. They are commemorated by a bronze information plaque and statue placed near the site of the shaft at the west end of 12th Street in Golden by the Colorado School of Mines. An bronze plaque dedicated on September 9th, 1936, show on the left, reads as follows:

Dedicated to the memory of

Joseph Allen
William Bowden
William Collins
John Collins
Henry Huesman
David Lloyd
Joseph Hutter
John Morgan
John Murphy
Rich Rowe
Who lost their lives here on
Sept. 9th, 1889

And are entombed in this plot.

The memorial was rededicated on October 29th, 2016. Additional plaques were added and the White Ash Miner Statue, sculpted by Cloyd Barnes and which was previously located in the Mines Museum of Earth Science, was moved to the mine site.
