= Newton Chikli Colliery disaster =

Coal mine disaster in Madhya Pradesh, India

The Newton Chikli Colliery disaster is an incident in Chhindwara (M.P.), India, which occurred on 10 December 1954. This incident occurred due to flooding of the mine caused by the inrush of water from the old workings of the same mine. A total of 63 persons were entrapped and drowned.

There were 112 persons inside the mine when it was inundated. 49 persons managed to effect their escape through the incline; the remaining 63 persons were entrapped and drowned.

== Cause ==
The working was abandoned in 1933 at one seam. A substantial quantity of water had accumulated in the abandoned workings between 1933 and 1954. New working was started below 13 metres of this seam. The new workings in the bottom seam got connected with the old water-logged workings and water rushed into the new workings, flooding them. The old workings had not been shown correctly on the plan. The management was not aware that the new workings had approached so close to the abandoned workings.

== See also ==
- National Geographic Seconds From Disaster episodes
