= Coalbrook mining disaster =

1960 mineshaft collapse at Clydesdale Colliery, South Africa

Coordinates: 26.8531°S 27.8790°E

Coalbrook Mining Disaster
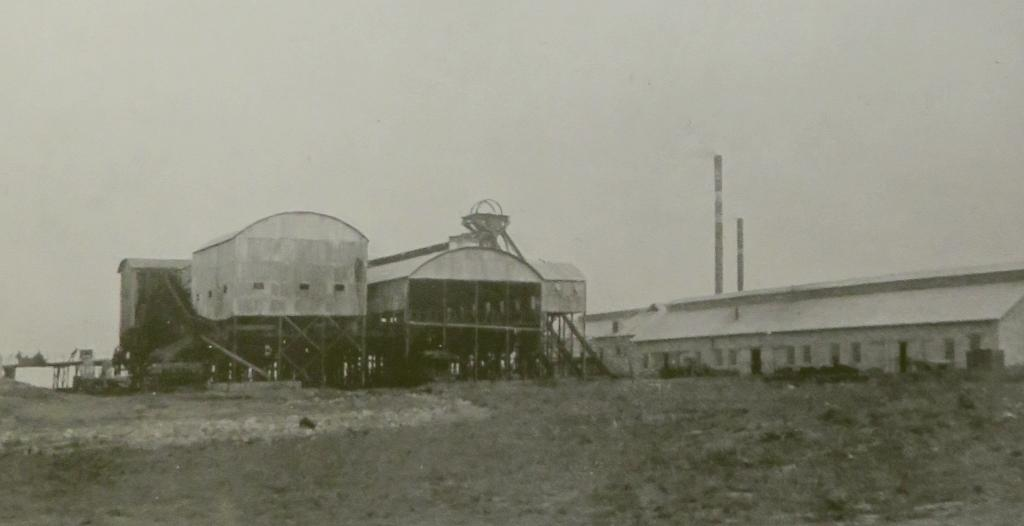
- Coalbrook Mine in 1910
- Date: 21 January 1960
- Time: 19h 00
- Location: Northern Free State, South Africa
- Cause: Cascading Pillar Failure
- Deaths: 437 and unknown number of mules

The Coalbrook mining disaster was the worst mining accident in the history of South Africa. The disaster occurred in the Coalbrook coal mine of Clydesdale Colliery on 21 January 1960 at around 19:00 when approximately 900 pillars caved in, almost 180 metres (590 ft) underground. The mine is situated in the Northern Free State, 21 kilometres (13 mi) south west of Vereeniging. About 1,000 miners were in the mine at the time and 437 died after being trapped, while the rest escaped through an incline shaft. The miners were suffocated by methane gas and crushed to death by rockfall.

Miners felt a strong blast wind, and many rushed up to the surface but were instructed to return underground or face imprisonment. Only two miners refused to go back underground. The majority of the miners at Clydesdale Colliery were Lesotho and Mozambique nationals.

Immediately after the incident, rescue teams arrived from other mines in the region and boreholes were drilled into areas where survivors were expected to be. When microphones were lowered, no signs of life were detected. After 11 days, the rescue was called off.

== Disaster ==
The first sign of the future mining disaster at the Coalbrook mine occurred 24 days earlier at 19h00 on 28 December 1959. In the northern part of the mine, Section 10, 6ha of mine roof collapsed only stopping when 12.2m wide pillars south of the collapse were reached. No night shift was on duty in this area of the mine, while the day shift had expressed no concerns. One person was injured in another section when a wind blast entered the other parts of the mine. Further roof noise and pillar scaling were observed for three days then stopped. The mining inspector was never informed of the collapse.

On 21 January 1960, at 16h00, a supervisor working to the west of section 10 heard noises and saw pillar scaling coming from the later. He evacuated his men to safety but they were caught in the wind blast while getting out of the area. The event was reported to their shift boss.

Another group of miners, south of Section 10, were hit by a stronger wind blast and loud rumble around 16h20, and evacuated as well. The mine overseer and acting mine manager investigate the area near section 10 hearing cracking noises, finding blown out ventilation stoppings (prevents air and gas movement), leaking methane but no carbon monoxide from an explosion. Reports came in about ground subsidence and cracks formed in landscape above this section. A decision was made to keep men away from section 10, repairs made to the ventilation stoppings and mining continue in the eastern part of the mine.

At 19h00, during repairs to the ventilation stoppings, then men encountered noise and methane so they evacuated but were again hit by strong wind gusts and dust. The strong wind gusts continued for 10 minutes then a lesser gust of wind for a further 45 minutes. It was soon discovered that 438 miners from four sections of the eastern part of the mine had not evacuated to the surface.

== Rescue efforts ==
Immediately after the accident, rescue teams were deployed to the scene from other mines in the area.

As the mine contained too much methane and carbon monoxide for a rescue team to enter the southeast of Section 10, the emergency services decided to drill from the surface to the buried area. A new, sophisticated drill rig was used, but the drills wore out when they met the dolerite layer. Drilling was progressing very slowly, and new drill heads had to be sent in all the time, some even arriving from Texas. When rescue teams managed to reach the area where the miners were supposed to be, microphones were lowered into the shafts, but no signs of life were detected. No bodies were found at the end of the rescue operations.

After 11 days, the rescue operation was abandoned when rescuers understood that none of the trapped miners could survive. Prime Minister Hendrik Verwoerd declared, after three attempts to drill to a depth of 500 feet (152 m), that "all hope" had been abandoned.

However, the wives of the missing miners continued to hope for their survival and called for the search to continue, despite the protests of the emergency services, who also believed that there was no hope. At the same time, a seer named Petrus Johannes Kleinhans claimed to have a vision showing the exact position of ten men still alive, seven blacks and three whites. As he directed the rescuers to the area seen, more than 300 metres (980 ft) from the estimated position of the accident, and they began to dig, he then shared a new vision with them, this time claiming that all the men were dead.

The emergency services tried to find the bodies of the missing miners, in order to reassure the workers who were still alive and get them back to work. Indeed, workers of African descent were frightened by the idea that bodies were still lying at the bottom of the mine. The search for bodies yielded nothing. Unable to find the remains of the missing, the collapsed sections were filled with concrete.

The mine resumed operations on March 18 in the sections not affected by the collapse, and the following year, the mine returned to 75% of its pre-disaster production.

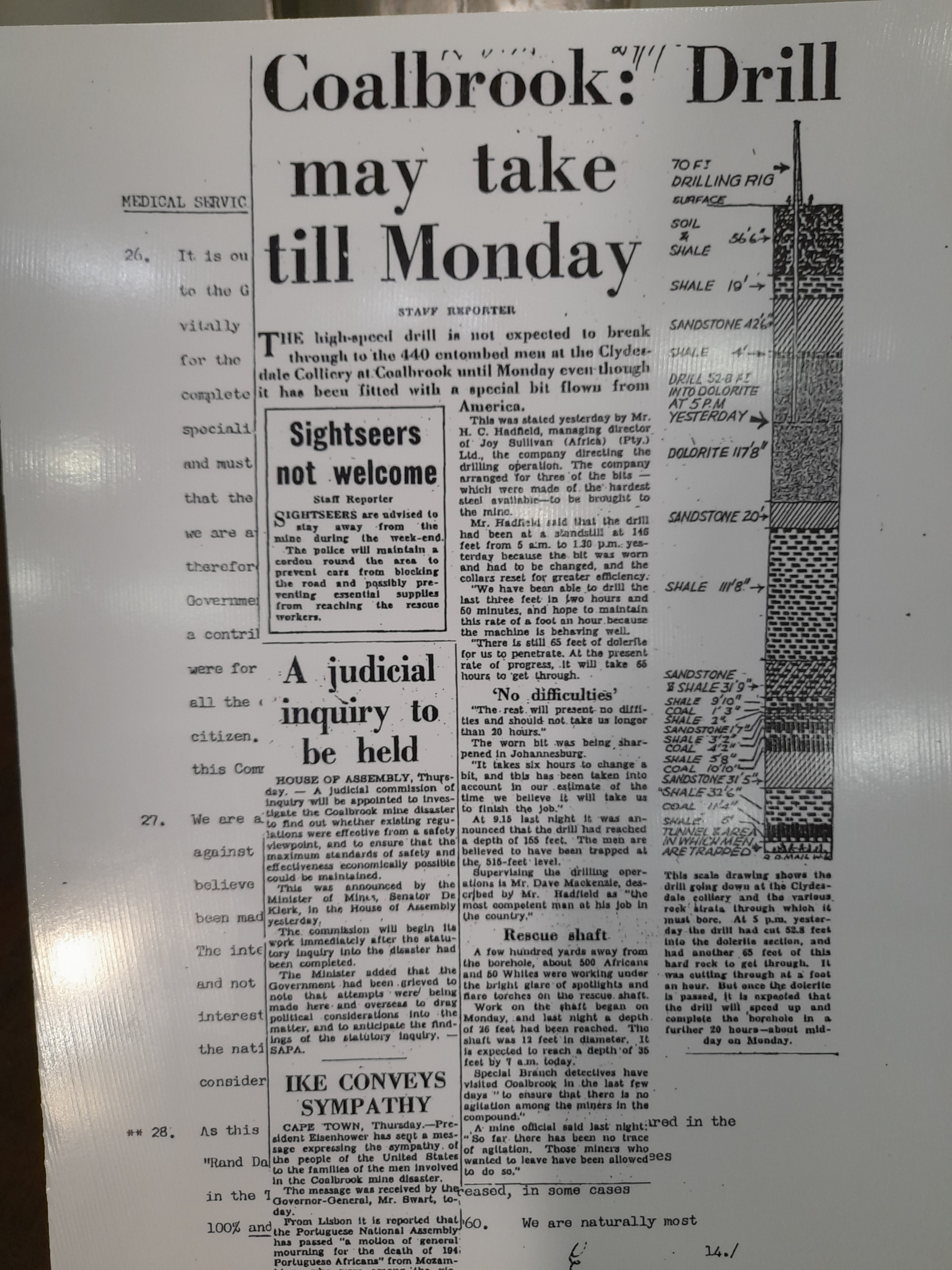
Newspaper reports of the disaster in 1960

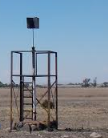
Last rescue attempt site to reach the miners

== Causes of the disaster ==
The production at the mine had increased from 134,230 tons per year in 1954 to 2,260,660 tons per year by 1958, in response to the newly built Taaibos power station at Kragbron.

The accident was caused by cascading pillar failure where a few pillars fail initially and this increases the load on the adjacent pillars causing them to fail. This cascading failure caused pillar collapse over an area covering 324 hectares.

Factors contributing to the collapse included the process of top coaling which raised the height of the tunnels and pillar and panel mining reducing the size of structures holding up the tunnel roof.

=== Top coaling ===
Top coaling began as a method of increasing production in areas that had already been mined. In 1932 the tunnels were 2.4 m high, in 1948 some top coaling was done to raise the height to 3.7 m, but the coal yielded was a poor grade and the practice stopped. In 1951 top coaling began once again as a new electricity power station had been built and it was able to use lower grade coal. The roof height was raised to 4.3 m and 5.5 m in places, and by 1957 top coaling was a significant contributor to production.

Some time between 1957 and 1959 experimental secondary mining was done in No.10 section to recover coal from a mined out area of the mine. Top coaling raised the roof height to between 4.3 and 6.1 m. On 28 December 1959 a collapse occurred in the northern part of the section 10 mine, an area where most of the top coaling experiments were done.

That collapse was stopped from spreading by a barrier wall to the south end of section 10. This incident did not affect coal extraction from the south. However, it did go unreported to mining inspectors.

It is reported that in the afternoon of 21 January 1960 miners who were operating in the western part of the section 10 mine heard loud noises that were trailed by a strong blast wind that was coming from the south east section.

=== Pillar and panel mining ===
Example of the pillar mining at Coalbrook

The tunnels in the mine were between 6.1 and 6.7 metres wide. Pillars and panels of coal were left between the tunnels to keep the mine roof from collapsing.

- In 1905 the centres of the barriers and the pillars were 24.4 m apart
- From 1932 the pillars were mined to 19.8 m and barriers to 18.3 m.
- From 1943 the pillars were reduced to 18.3 m and the barriers 12.2 m (still separated by tunnels 6.1 to 6.7 m in width)

In this time "dummies" of 4 metres wide and 2 metres deep were mined out of the barriers, and in some cases up to four sides of the pillars, to yield additional coal.

=== Failure of the dolerite layer ===
The layer of dolerite, a very dense and very hard rock, is also thought to have played a role in the disaster. During the first collapse, which was of lesser importance, this layer would have been weakened by the impact. Then, shortly before the main collapse, the rock would no longer have been able to support its own weight and hold together in a single block. It would therefore have broken, which would have increased the mass weighing on the coal pillars until they broke.

== Response ==
In the months following the disaster, four different inquiries were launched under the Mines and Works Act of 1956, with the third one being a judicial inquest. The inquests found that the deaths occurred as a result of the subsidence of the mine itself. They also revealed that the collapse of 28 December was not reported to mining inspectors, as was mandatory.

Following the disaster, the South African government established Coal Mines Research Controlling Council to improve coal mine safety and research pillar strength, supported by the Council for Scientific and Industrial Research and the Chamber of Mines Research Organization.

In later years, the South African Chamber of Mines obtained new rescue drills to extract men trapped underground in coal mines. Similar equipment was used to rescue trapped Chilean miners in 2010.

== Compensation ==
The disaster prompted the government to set up the National Mine Disaster Fund. With segregation being a policy of governance for the Apartheid regime, the Workmen Compensation Act entitled a white widow to her deceased husband’s pension fund, while a black widow was only granted a lump sum from the mining company. Of the miners killed, six were white South Africans, while half of the remainder were black miners from the then British High Commission Territory of Basutoland, and a little under half of the others were black miners from Portuguese East Africa.

== Commemorations ==
The first commemorations of the disaster took place in January 2000 when a Taiwanese businessman, Richard Hse who bought the area where the mine compound is, organized a commemorative event. Since then, no official commemoration has been held by the South African government. In 2017, the Mine Health and Safety Council (MHSC) and other stakeholder groups involved promoted the construction and installation of a tribute memorial and plaque at the site. Little is known about the status of other plans to have a museum and information center built in order to make the location a tourist destination in the area. On January 21, 2025 the community of Zamdela, Sasolburg led by Kedibone Motlhasedi organized the first commemorations to have the MEC of the Free State Sports, Arts, Culture, and Recreation: Ms Zanele Sifuba. The site is being declared a heritage site.

An Afrikaner band, Die Briels, recorded and released a song in 1961 called "Die Mynerslied" in tribute to the miners.

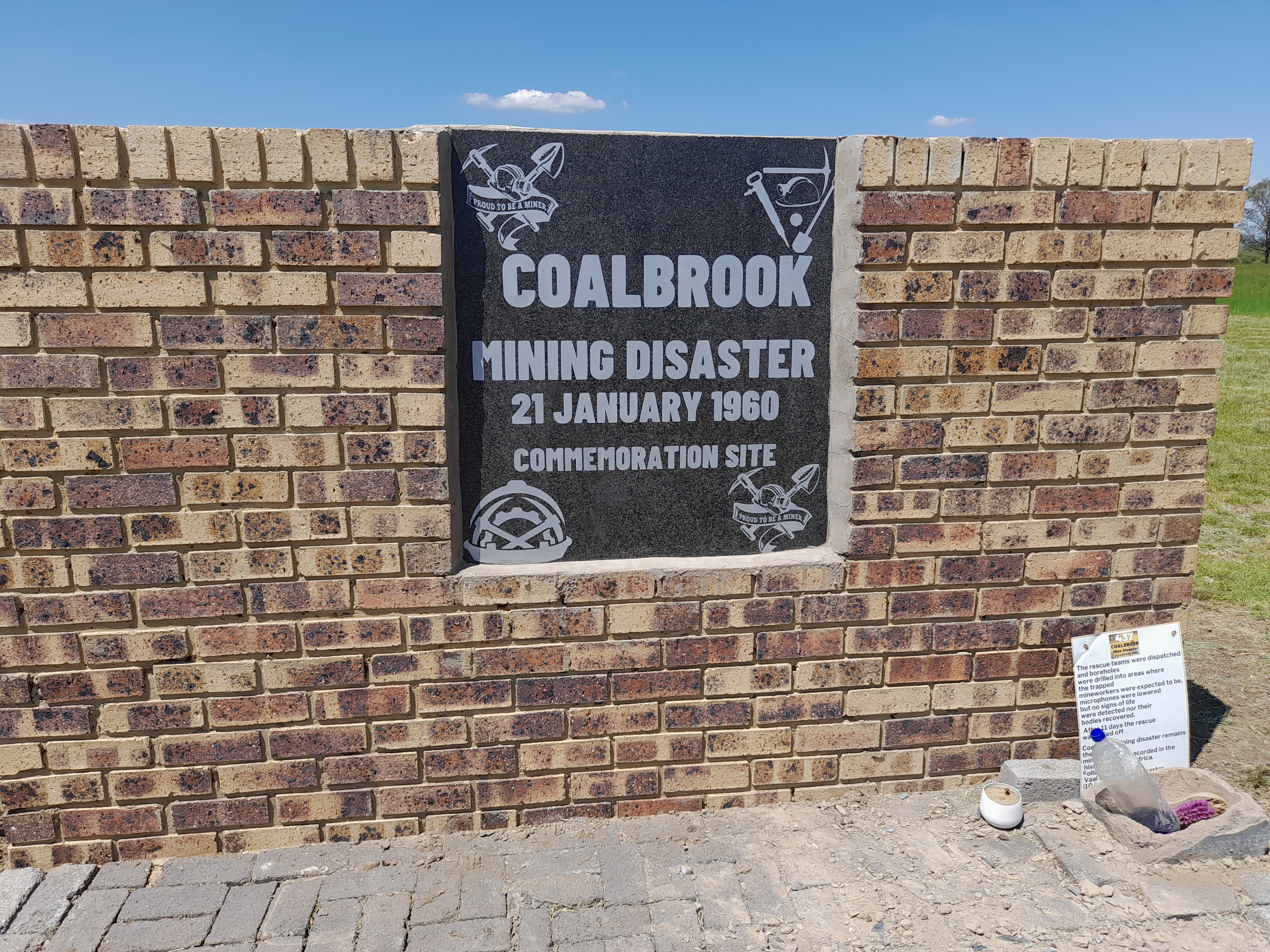
Commemoration site

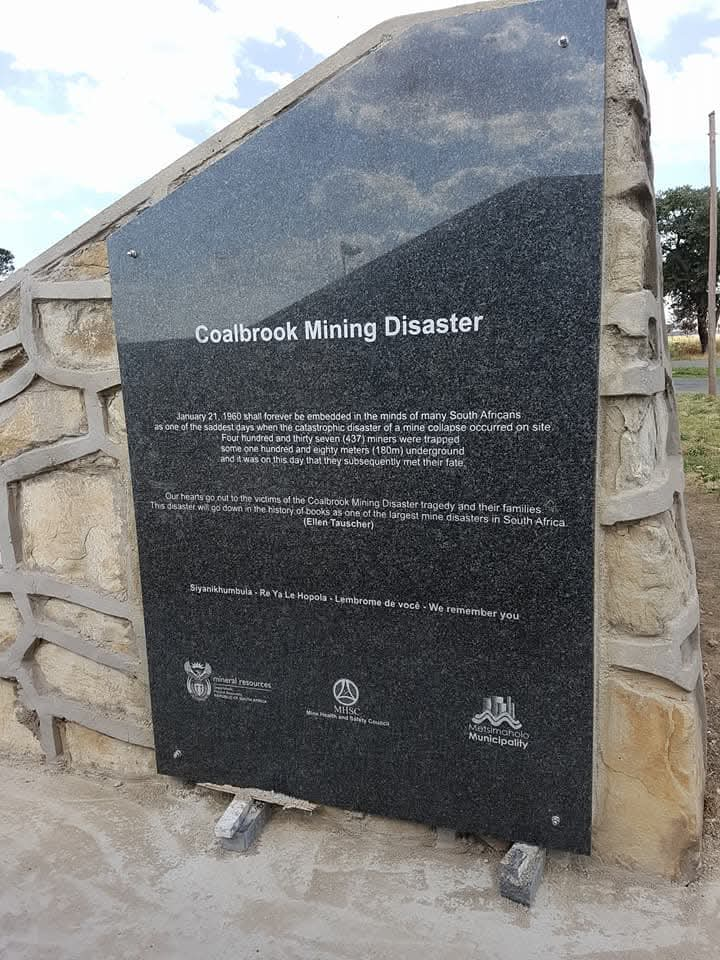
Memorial Plaque by the Mine Health and Safety
