= Nambija mine disaster =

1993 landslide in Ecuador

Coordinates: 4°4′14″S 78°47′11″W

- Location of Zamora Chinchipe in Ecuador
- Date: May 9, 1993
- Time: ECT
- Location: Nambija, Ecuador
- Deaths: ~300 killed

The Nambija mine disaster was a landslide which occurred in a remote mining settlement in the southeastern part of Ecuador on 9 May 1993. A part of the mountain above the countless mines gave way and buried about 300 people. A definite number will never be known, since there are no records about the number of people living or working in Nambija.

== Location and slide ==
The Nambija mining settlement is located in the southeastern part of Ecuador, high up in the mountains, in Zamora-Chinchipe Province, about 30 km east of Zamora, close to the Peruvian border. It can only be reached after a three-hour drive over a rough gravel road, which was only built in 1986. The town itself is situated in a valley, 2600m above sea level, built on the steep slopes of the mountains. Most of the houses are built right on the tunnel entrances to the mines, made from corrugated iron and tin. The mountains are riddled with adits and holes. The air is damp and full of toxic fumes from the mining process, making Nambija one of the most inhospitable places on earth. Torrential rains during the days before the disaster, softening the soil even more, made things worse.

Nambija has the title of being "The World's Most Dangerous Gold Town". This is due to the fact that violence and crime rate were very high, understandably, if you consider 10.000 people living on a patch of land about 1 square km in size. Working and living conditions played a role in this title, too. Every family had their own mine, mine shafts were hitting other mines, even basic principles of static went unobserved.

Thus, the mountains around Nambija were virtually hollow by 1990, and experts warned that further mining would drastically increase the probability of a landslide. Also, the vibrations from the huge rock crushing plant in the center of the town were a cause for fear.

Then, on the afternoon of May 9, 1993, Mother's Day, a large part of the mountain at the end of the valley, above the mines and part of the town, collapsed. About 80 homes were destroyed, with an estimated 200-250 people living in them. (The link to the Houston Chronicle which used to be here is dead and was thus removed) A lot of the homes doubled as entrance shacks to the mines, and people working in there were buried. Rescue operations were difficult, since the site is so hard to reach. For the people there though, the disaster is just a part of their daily life. In the unaffected parts of the settlement, mining went on.

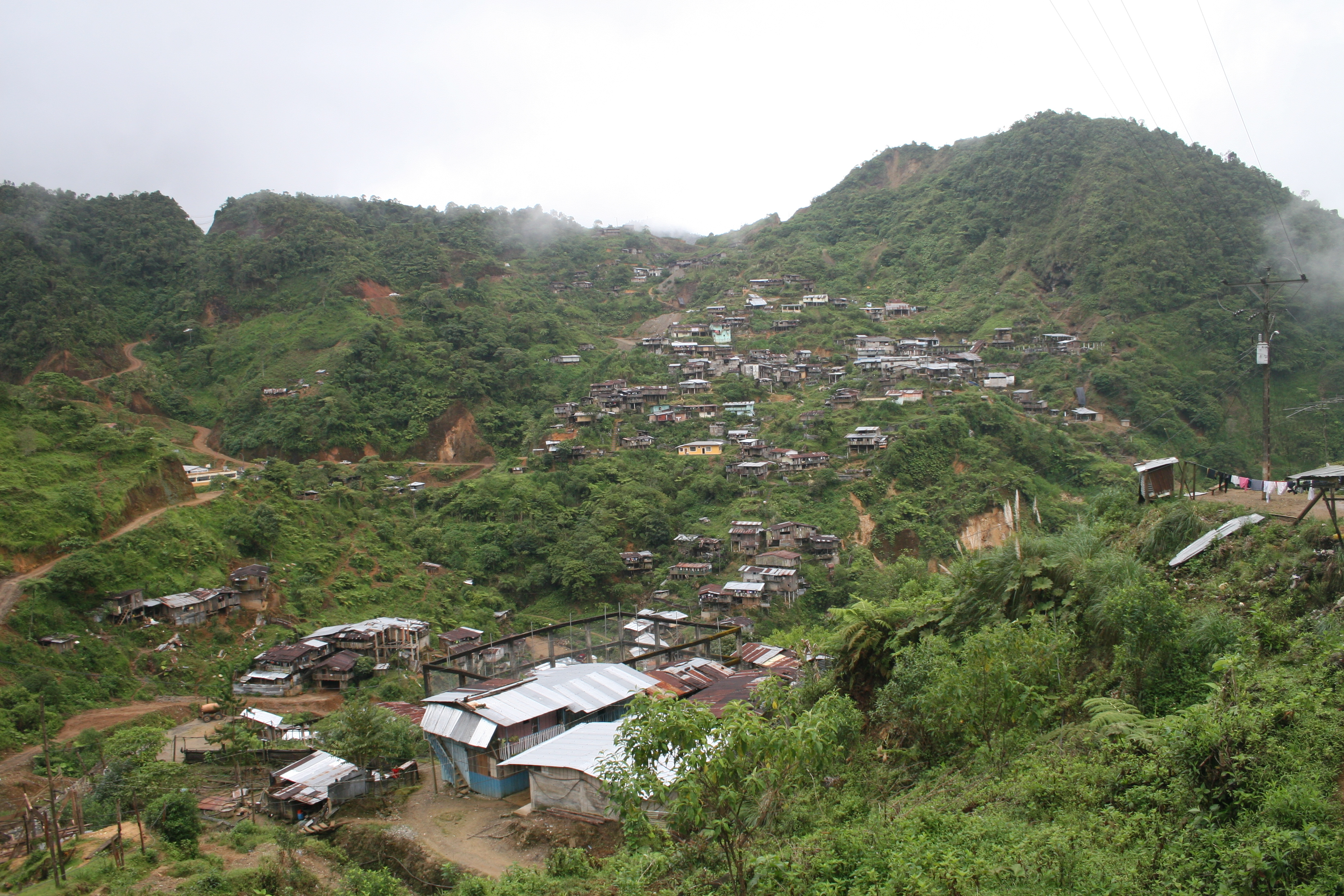
Overview of Nambija. The area affected by the landslide is in the top left.

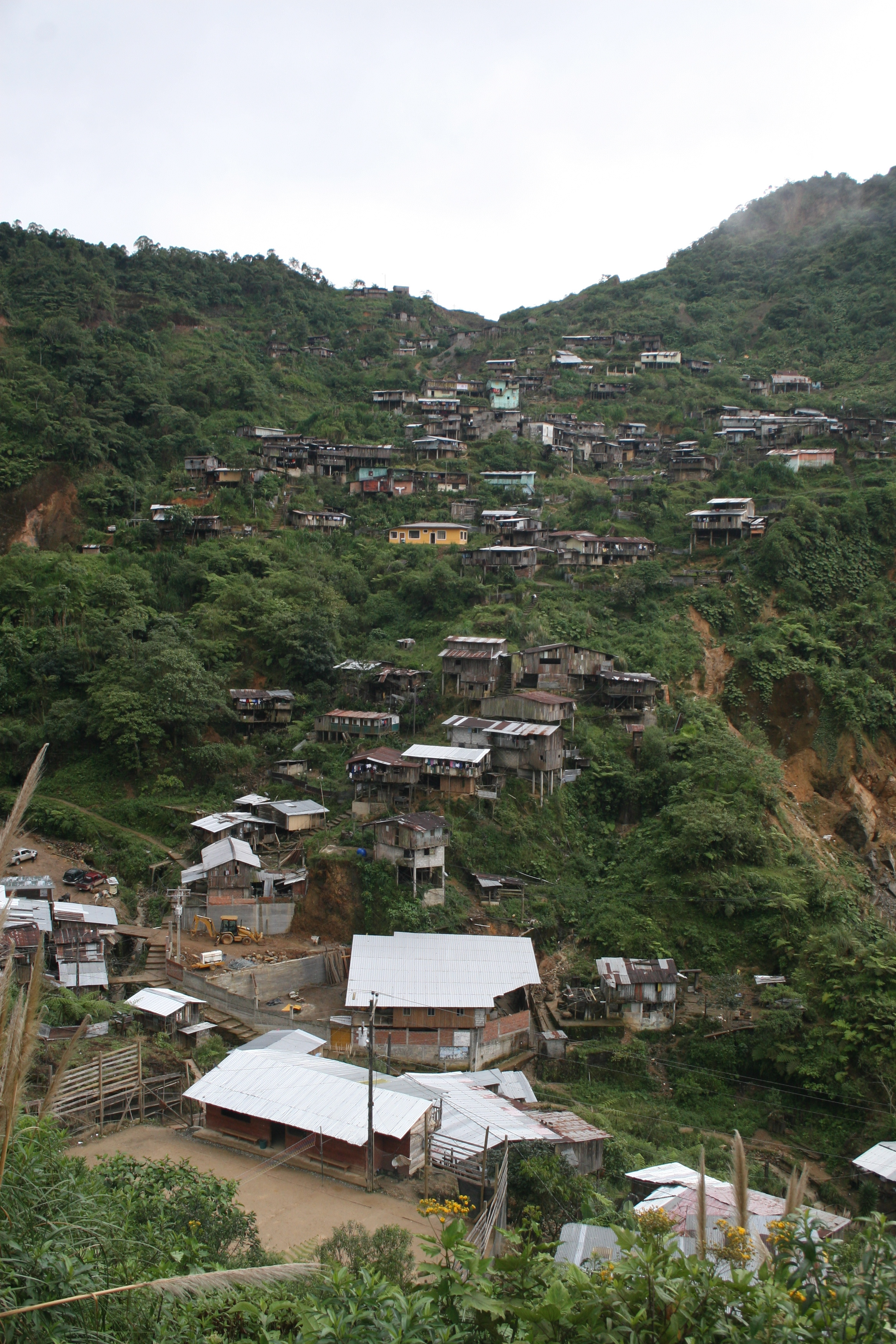
Closeup of huts in Nambija

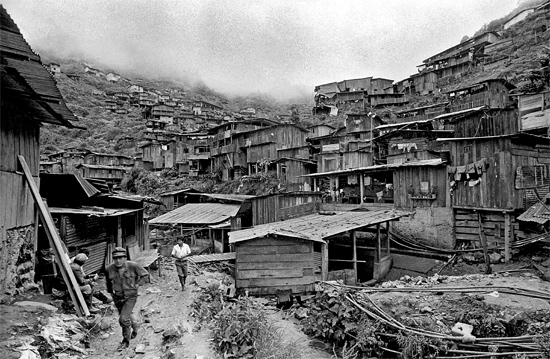
Nambija in 1993

== Casualties ==
A reliable number of casualties is nowhere to be found, and probably never will. Early estimates told of about 80 people being killed, later numbers went as high as 400. The location of the slide, clearly visible even today, is an official graveyard, and many of the people buried in the disaster still lie under the mountain. Since no one knows the number of people living and working in Nambija at any given time, an accurate account of the people killed is impossible. Still, apart from the catastrophic living and working conditions, the events of this single day represent one of the worst mining disasters ever, and remain virtually unknown due to the remoteness of the site.
