= Abercarn colliery disaster =

Explosion in the Prince of Wales Colliery

Coordinates: 51°38′51″N 3°07′53″W

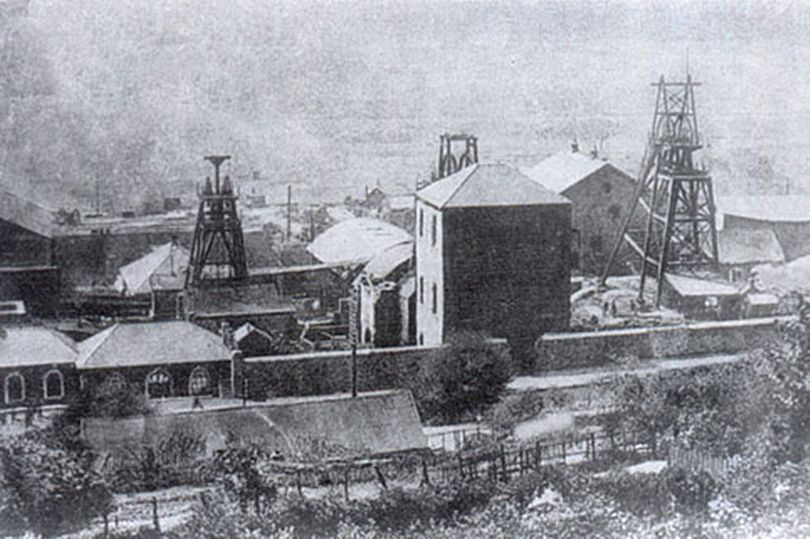
- Prince of Wales Colliery in Abercarn
- Date: 11 September 1878
- Location: Abercarn, South Wales
- Deaths: 268 men and boys
- Verdict: Explosion caused by firedamp ignition
- Awards: Two Albert Medals of the First Class; Six Albert Medals of the Second Class

The Abercarn colliery disaster was a catastrophic explosion within the Prince of Wales Colliery in the Welsh village of Abercarn (then in the county of Monmouthshire), on 11 September 1878, killing 268 men and boys (though an exact number of casualties remains unknown). The cause was assumed to have been the ignition of firedamp by a safety lamp. The disaster is the third worst for loss of life to occur within the South Wales Coalfield.

== Explosion ==
Shortly after midday on 11 September 1878, with 325 men and boys working underground, a large explosion ripped through the Prince of Wales Colliery. The colliery's steam whistle blew, signalling that an emergency was under way, drawing colliers and the families of those trapped to the pit head.

The explosion caused significant damage to the mine's roadways and to the bottom of the main shaft. Several fires ignited the coal seams and supporting timber structures, filling the mine with smoke.

== Rescue attempts ==
A rescue team entered the main shaft but damage meant the winding gear could reach only 295 yards (270 m) down. John Harris climbed down guide ropes and rescued several men. After several hours in the pit, the rescue team was withdrawn over concerns of further explosions. In all, some 90 colliers were saved.

Two miles (3 km) from the main pit, another rescue team ventured into a shallow downcast or ventilation shaft, but were ordered to withdraw due to the likelihood of another explosion happening. Only 12 bodies were retrieved, leaving over 250 men and boys within the mine.

== Flooding of the mine ==
Due to the ongoing fires within the mine, the colliery owners, with support from the government, sealed the mine and flooded it. Water was redirected from the local Monmouthshire Canal; over a period of two months, some 35 million imperial gallons (160 million litres; 42 million US gallons) were poured into the mine to dampen the fires. The mine did not reopen until 1882.

== Gallantry awards ==
On 16 August 1879, Queen Victoria conferred the Albert Medal for Lifesaving to the following rescuers, all from Abercarn:

Albert Medals of the First Class

- Henry Davies, collier
- John Harris, mason

Albert Medals of the Second Class

- William Simons, pumpman
- Thomas Herbert, pumpman
- Miles Moseley, overman
- Charles Preen, collier
- William Walters, collier
- Lewis Harris, overman
