= History of coal mining =

The history of coal mining goes back thousands of years, with early mines documented in ancient China, the Roman Empire and other early historical economies. It became important in the Industrial Revolution of the 18th and 19th centuries, when it was primarily used to power steam engines, heat buildings and generate electricity. Coal mining continues as an important economic activity today. Due to coal's strong contribution to global warming and environmental issues, coal is generally seen as a high impact fossil fuel. However, global demand consistently grows.

Compared to wood fuels, coal yields a higher amount of energy per unit mass (sometimes known as specific energy or massic energy) and can often be obtained in areas where wood is not readily available. Though it was used historically as a domestic fuel, coal is now used mostly in industry, especially in smelting and alloy production, as well as electricity generation. Large-scale coal mining developed during the Industrial Revolution, and coal provided the main source of primary energy for industry and transportation in industrial areas from the 18th century to the 1950s. Coal remains an important energy source. Coal is also mined today on a large scale by open pit methods wherever the coal strata strike the surface or are relatively shallow. Britain developed the main techniques of underground coal mining from the late 18th century onward, with further progress being driven by 19th-century and early 20th-century progress. However, oil and gas were increasingly used as alternatives from the 1860s onward.

By the late 20th century, coal was, for the most part, replaced in domestic as well as industrial and transportation usage by oil, natural gas or electricity produced from oil, gas, nuclear power or renewable energy sources. By 2010, coal produced over a fourth of the world's energy.

Since 1890, coal mining has also been a political and social issue. Coal miners' labour and trade unions became powerful in many countries in the 20th century, and often, the miners were leaders of the Left or Socialist movements (as in Britain, Germany, Poland, Japan, Chile, Canada and the U.S.) Since 1970, environmental issues have been increasingly important, including the health of miners, destruction of the landscape from strip mines and mountaintop removal, air pollution, and coal combustion's contribution to global warming.

== Early history ==
=== Prehistoric times ===
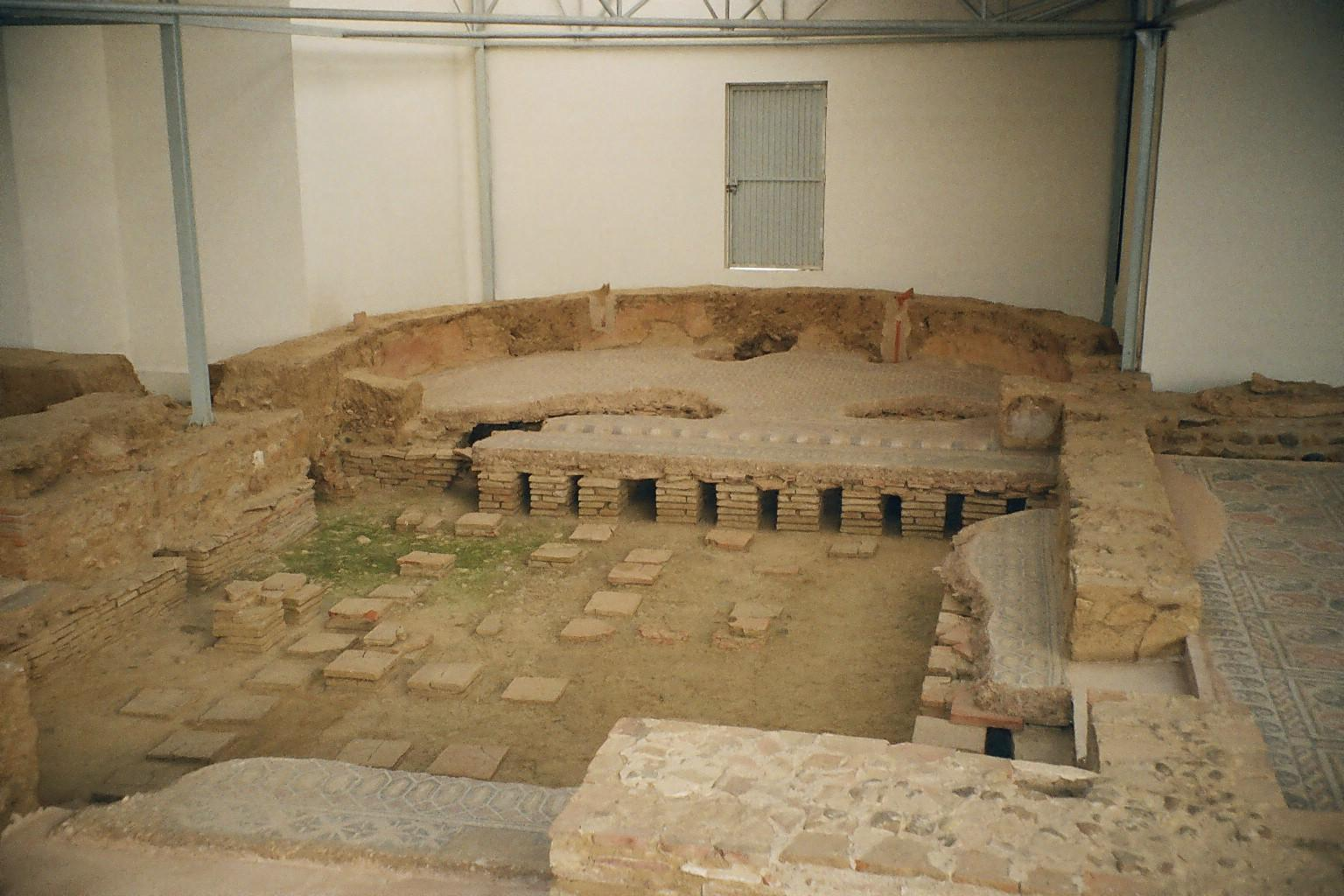
Ruins of the hypocaust under the floor of the Roman villa La Olmeda. The part under the exedra is covered.

Early coal extraction was small-scale, the coal lying either on the surface, or very close to it. Typical methods of extraction included drift mining and bell pits. As well as drift mines, small scale shaft mining was used. This took the form of a bell pit, the extraction working outward from a central shaft, or a technique called room and pillar, in which "rooms" of coal were extracted with pillars left to support the roofs. Both of these techniques however left a considerable amount of usable coal behind.

The oldest intentional use of black coal was documented in Petřkovice (Ostrava) in the Czech Republic, in a settlement from the older Stone Age on the top of Landek Hill. According to radiocarbon dating, the site falls within the period 25,000–23,000 years BCE.

Additionally, the 2019 Les Canalettes rockshelter Middle Paleolithic excavation high on the French Larzac plateau had evidence of brown (lignite) coal use by Neanderthals as a speculated supplement to extend wood use approximately 70,000 years ago. The coal source came from 10 to 15 km (6 to 10 miles) away and was found most abundant in the layered hearths at times when warm-loving tree species grew locally. Adding 500 g (1.1 lbs) of lignite will dramatically extend a fire's embers' life.

Archaeological evidence in China indicates surface mining of coal and household usage after approximately 3490 BCE.

The earliest reference to the use of coal in metalworking is found in the geological treatise On stones (Lap. 16) by the Greek scientist Theophrastus (c. 371–287 BCE):

Among the materials that are dug because they are useful, those known as coals are made of earth, and, once set on fire, they burn like charcoal. They are found in Liguria... and in Elis as one approaches Olympia by the mountain road; and they are used by those who work in metals.

The earliest known use of coal in the Americas was by the Aztecs who used coal for fuel and jet (a type of lignite) for ornaments.

=== 1st to 13th centuries CE ===
In Roman Britain, the Romans were exploiting all major coalfields (save those of north Staffordshire and south Staffordshire) by the late 2nd century CE. While much of its use remained local, a lively trade developed along the North Sea coast supplying coal to Yorkshire and London. This also extended to the continental Rhineland, where bituminous coal was already used for the smelting of iron ore. It was used in hypocausts to heat public baths, the baths in military forts, and the villas of wealthy individuals. Excavation has revealed coal stores at many forts along Hadrian's Wall as well as the remains of a smelting industry at forts such as Longovicium nearby.

After the Romans left Britain in 410 CE, there are few records of coal being used in the country until the end of the 12th century. One that does occur is in the Anglo-Saxon Chronicle for the year 852, when a rent including 12 loads of coal is mentioned in Lincolnshire. In 1183 a smith was given land for his work, and was required to "raise his own coal" Shortly after the granting of the Magna Carta, in 1215, coal began to be traded in areas of Scotland and north-east England, where the carboniferous strata were exposed on the seashore, and thus became known as "sea coal". This commodity, however, was not suitable for use in the type of domestic hearths then in use and was mainly used by artisans for lime burning, metal working and smelting. Slowly, coal-burning fireplaces and chimneys evolved in England. As early as 1228, sea coal from the north-east was being taken to London.

During the 13th century, the trading of coal increased across Britain and by the end of the century most of the coalfields in England, Scotland and Wales were being worked on a small scale. As the use of coal amongst the artisans became more widespread, it became clear that coal smoke was detrimental to health, and the increasing pollution in London led to much unrest and agitation. As a result of this, a royal proclamation was issued in 1306 prohibiting artificers of London from using sea coal in their furnaces and commanding them to return to the traditional fuels of wood and charcoal.

Marco Polo wrote about the widespread use of coal in Yuan dynasty China in the late 13th century in The Travels of Marco Polo, remarking that coal was the primary fuel of the land and that it helped support heated baths for the citizenry beyond what wood would be able to do.

=== 14th to 17th centuries ===
During the first half of the 14th century coal began to be used for domestic heating in coal producing areas of Britain, as improvements were made in the design of domestic hearths. Edward III was the first king to take an interest in the coal trade of the north east, issuing a number of writs to regulate the trade and allowing the export of coal to Calais. The demand for coal steadily increased in Britain during the 15th century, but it was still mainly being used in the mining districts, in coastal towns or being exported to continental Europe. However, by the middle of the 16th century supplies of wood were beginning to fail in Britain and the use of coal as a domestic fuel rapidly expanded.

In 1575, Sir George Bruce of Carnock of Culross, Scotland, opened the first coal mine to extract coal from a "moat pit" under the sea in the Firth of Forth. He constructed an artificial loading island into which he sank a 40 ft (12 metre) shaft that connected to another two shafts for drainage and improved ventilation. The technology was far in advance of any coal mining method in the late medieval period, and was considered one of the industrial wonders of the age.

During the 17th century a number of advances in mining techniques were made, such as the use of test boring to find suitable deposits and chain pumps, driven by water wheels, to drain the collieries.

People who sold wood, and those who preferred the smell of wood smoke to coal smoke, opposed the transition in England from wood to coal. One name these opponents gave to the new fuel was "the devil's excrement". If the coal had a high sulfur content, such a description was quite apt.

North American coal deposits were first discovered by French explorers and fur traders along the shores of Grand Lake in central New Brunswick, Canada in the 1600s. Coal seams were exposed where rivers flowed into the lake, and were dug by hand off the surface and from tunnels dug into the seam. About 1631 the French made their fur trading post at the mouth of the Saint John River their main post in Acadia and started construction of a new fort. The main residence at the fort was designed with two 11-foot-wide (3.4 metres) fireplaces which were stocked with wood and coal from upriver. As early as 1643, the French were shipping coal to Boston, the capital of the English Massachusetts Bay Colony.

== Industrial Revolution ==
The Industrial Revolution, which began in Britain in the 18th century, and later spread to continental Europe, North America, and Japan, was based on the availability of coal to power steam engines. International trade expanded exponentially when coal-fed steam engines were built for the railways and steamships during the Victorian era. Coal was cheaper and much more efficient than wood fuel in most steam engines. Because central and Northern England contains an abundance of coal, many mines were situated in these areas, as well as in the South Wales coalfield, and Scotland. The small-scale techniques were unsuited to the increasing demand, with extraction moving away from surface extraction to deep shaft mining as the Industrial Revolution progressed.

== Beginning of the 20th century ==
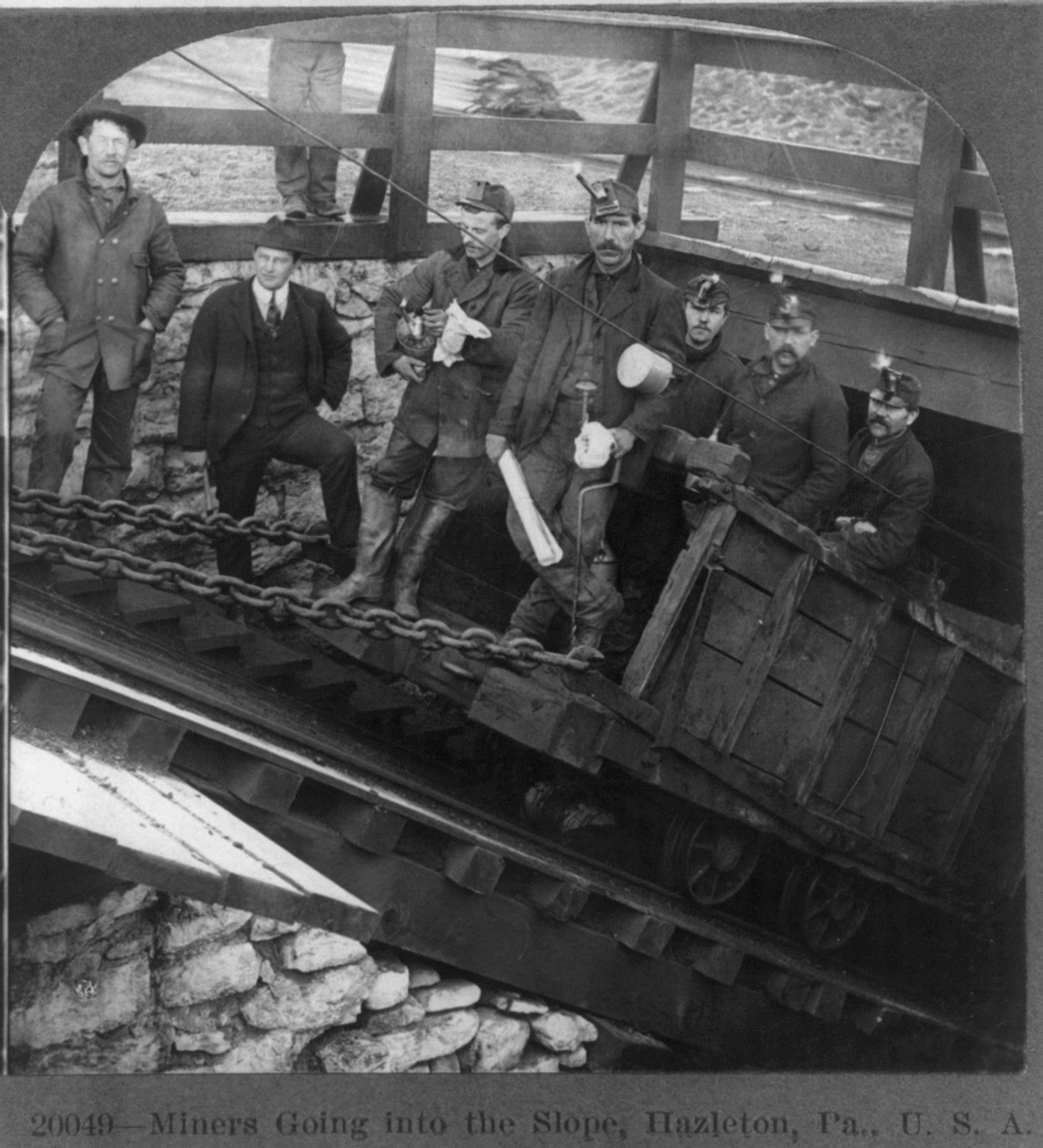
Coal miners in Hazleton PA, US, 1905

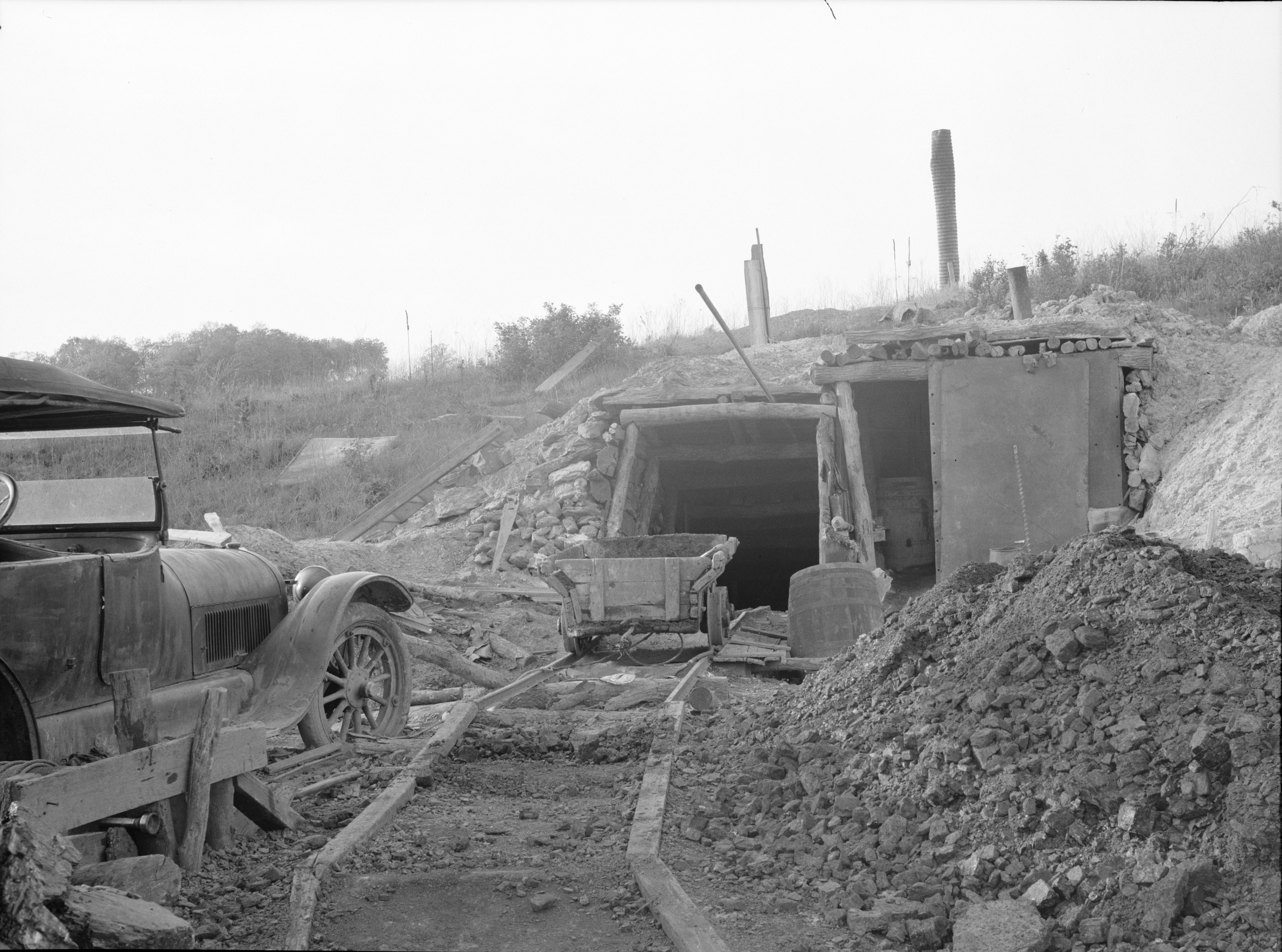
Iowa coal mine, 1936

World coal production, around 1905
Country	Year	Amount (short tons)
Europe
United Kingdom	1905	236,128,936
Germany (coal)		121,298,167
Germany (lignite)		52,498,507
France		35,869,497
Belgium		21,775,280
Austria (coal)		12,585,263
Austria (lignite)		22,692,076
Hungary (coal)	1904	1,031,501
Hungary (lignite)		5,447,283
Spain	1905	3,202,911
Russia	1904	19,318,000
Netherlands		466,997
Bosnia (lignite)		540,237
Romania		110,000
Serbia	1904	183,204
Italy (coal and lignite)	1905	412,916
Sweden		322,384
Greece (lignite)	1904	466,997
Asia
India	1905	8,417,739
Japan	1905	11,542,000
Sumatra	1904	207,280
Africa
Transvaal	1904	2,409,033
Natal	1905	1,129,407
Cape Colony	1904	154,272
North and South America
United States	1905	350,821,000
Canada	1904	7,509,860
Mexico		700,000
Peru	1905	72,665
Australasia
New South Wales	1905	6,632,138
Queensland		529,326
Victoria		153,135
Western Australia		127,364
Tasmania		51,993
New Zealand		1,585,756

== Australia ==
In 1984 Australia surpassed the US as the world's largest coal exporter. One-third of Australia's coal exports were shipped from the Hunter Valley region of New South Wales, where coal mining and transport had begun nearly two centuries earlier. Coal River was the first name given by British settlers to the Hunter River after coal was found there in 1795. In 1804 the Sydney-based administration established a permanent convict settlement near the mouth of the Hunter River to mine and load the coal, predetermining the town's future as a coal port by naming it Newcastle. Today, Newcastle, NSW, is the largest coal port in the world. Now the state of Queensland is Australia's top coal producer, with its Bowen Basin the main source of black coal, and plans by miners such as Gina Rinehart to open up the Galilee and Surat Basins to coal mining. China became the main customer.

== Belgium ==
When iron and later steel became important in Wallonia around 1830, the Belgian coal industry had long been established and used steam engines for pumping. The Belgian coalfield lay near the navigable river Meuse, so coal was shipped downstream to the ports and cities of the Rhine-Meuse-Scheldt delta. The opening of the Saint-Quentin Canal in 1810 allowed coal to go by barge to Paris. The Belgian coalfield outcrops over most of its area, and the highly folded nature of the coal seams, part of the geological Rhenohercynian Zone, meant that surface occurrences of the coal were very abundant. Deep mines were not required at first, so a large number of small operations sprang up. There was a complex legal system for concessions, and often multiple layers had different owners. Entrepreneurs started going deeper and deeper, thanks to the good pumping system. In 1790, the maximum depth of mines was 220 meters (720 ft). By 1856, the average depth in the Borinage was 361 meters (1,184 ft), and in 1866, 437 meters (1,434 ft) and some pits had reached down 700 to 900 meters (2,300 to 3,000 ft); one was 1,065 meters (3,494 ft) deep, probably the deepest coal mine in Europe at this time. Gas explosions were a serious problem, and Belgium had high coal miner fatality rates. By the late 19th century the seams were becoming exhausted, and the steel industry was importing some coal from the Ruhr. André Dumont's discovery in 1900 of coal in the Campine basin, in the Belgian Province Limburg, prompted entrepreneurs from Liège to open coal mines, mainly producing coal for the steel industry. An announced re-organisation of the Belgian coal mines in 1965 resulted in strikes and a revolt which led to the death of two coal miners in 1966 at the Zwartberg mine. Coal was mined in the Liège basin until 1980, in the Southern Wallonian basin until 1984, and in the Campine basin until 1992.

== Canada ==
Canadian coal mining started in New Brunswick and also occurred in Alberta, British Columbia, Nova Scotia and Saskatchewan. The United States has been a major supplier for the industrial regions of Ontario. By 2000 about 19% of Canada's energy was supplied by coal, much of it imported from the U.S while Eastern Canadian ports import considerable coal from Venezuela.

=== New Brunswick ===
The first coal mining in North America began in New Brunswick, Canada, in the early 1600s. Coal was found by French explorers and fur traders along the shores of Grand Lake where rivers and erosion had exposed the coal. Small amounts of coal were dug from surface deposits and tunnels dug into the coal seams, and this coal supplied Fort Saint Marie, built by the French about 1632 at the mouth of the Saint John River. The French sold coal to the British colony at Boston as early as 1639. Due to this earliest export of coal in North America, Grand Lake has been recognized as a Canadian Historic Site. Coal mining expanded after the British took control of the area in the mid 1700s and encouraged permanent settlements in New Brunswick, Nova Scotia, Quebec and Ontario by British Loyalists. Beginning in 1765, over 11,000 Loyalists settled in N.B., most along the lower 100 miles of the Saint John River and around Grand Lake. Approximately 200,000 tons of coal were dug at Grand Lake between 1639 and 1887 using surface collection, vertical shafts and the room and pillar system. By 1920, the use of draglines and other modern equipment made strip mining possible and the privately owned Grand Lake area mines produced over 200,000 tons per year. Most of this coal was used by the railroad and large businesses. By 1936, a coal-burning electric power generating plant at Newcastle Creek was operating with two 33,000 volt lines going to Fredericton and one 66,000 volt line going to Marysville. By 1950, coal production at Grand Lake often reached 1 million tons per year. In 1969, all the privately owned Grand Lake area coal companies and approximately 1,000 employees were consolidated into one provincial government controlled company named N.B. Coal Ltd.. In 2009, the increasing availability of oil and environmental concerns with coal use caused the closing of the Grand Lake coal mines and New Brunswick's coal mining industry.

=== Nova Scotia ===
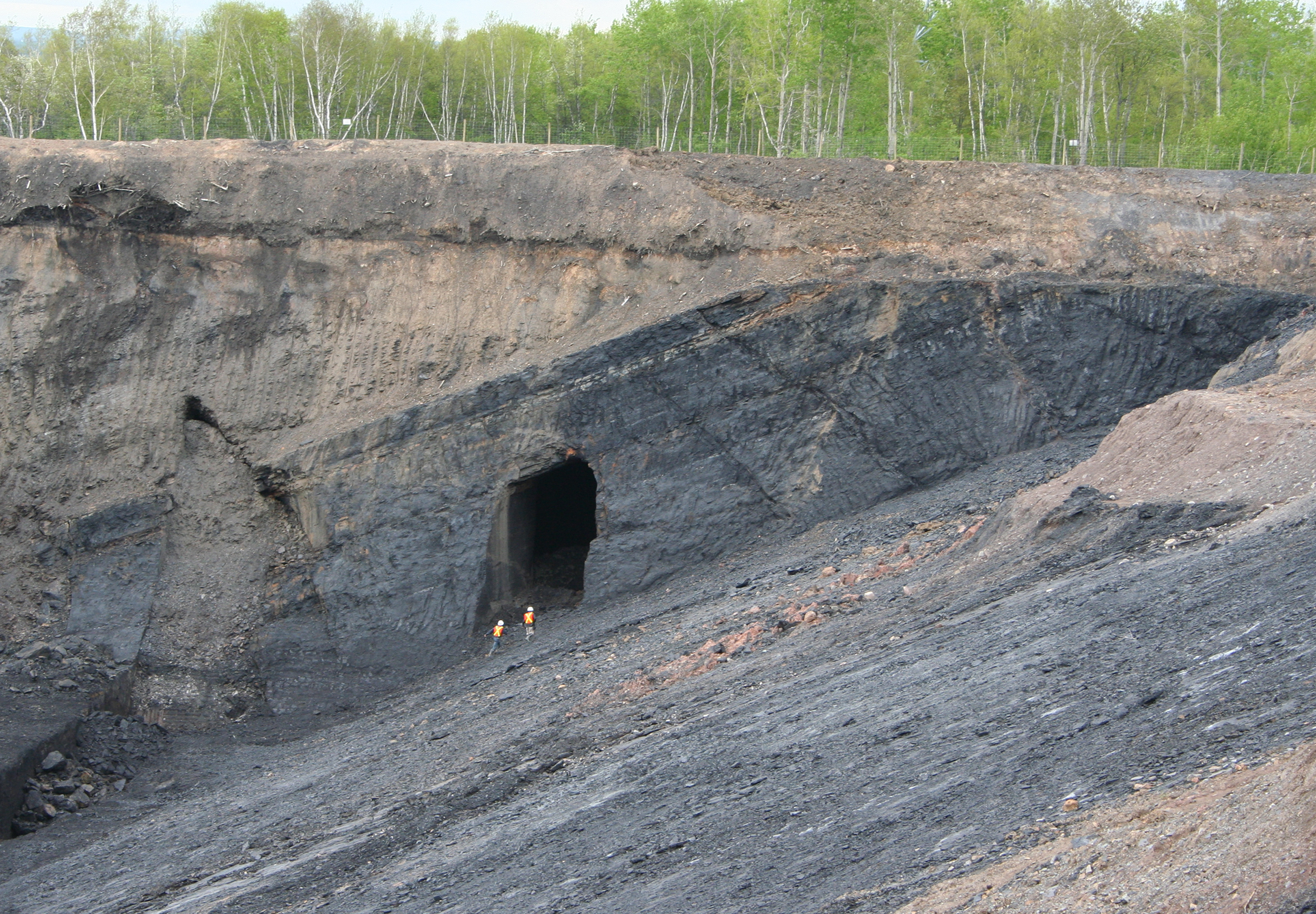
Foord Coal Seam, Stellarton

The first coal mining in Nova Scotia began in the 18th century with small hand-dug mines close to the sea at Joggins, Nova Scotia and in the Sydney area of Cape Breton Island. Large scale coal mining began in the late 1830s when the General Mining Association (GMA), a group of English mining investors, obtained a coal mining monopoly in Nova Scotia. They imported the latest in mining technology including steam water pumps and railways to develop large mines in the Stellarton area of Pictou County, Nova Scotia, including the Foord Pit which by 1866 was the deepest coal mine in the world. Coal mining also developed in Springhill and Joggins in Cumberland County, Nova Scotia. After the GMA monopoly expired, the largest and longest lasting mines developed at Cape Breton in Nova Scotia. Nova Scotia was the major supplier of Canadian coal until 1945. At its peak in 1949 25,000 miners dug 17 million metric tons of coal from Nova Scotian mines. The miners, who lived in company towns, became politically active in left-wing politics during labour struggles for safety and fair wages. Westray Mine near Stellarton closed in 1992 after an explosion killed 26 miners. All the subsurface mines were closed by 2001, although some open pit coal mining continues near Stellarton. The Nova Scotia Museum of Industry at Stellarton explores the history of mining in the province from its location on the site of the Foord Pit.

=== Alberta ===
Coal was easy to find in what is now Drumheller, Alberta, Canada. The Atlas Coal Mine National Historic Site has turned this coalfield into a museum. This museum interprets how the Blackfoot and Cree knew about the "black rock that burned." After colonizers reported coal in the area, a handful of ranchers and homesteaders dug out the coal for their homes. Sam Drumheller started the coal rush in this area when he bought the land from a local rancher, which he then sold to the Canadian National Railway. Sam Drumheller also registered a coal mine. However, before his mine opened Jesse Gouge and Garnet Coyle beat him to it by opening the Newcastle Mine. Once the railway was built thousands of people came to mine this area.

By the end of 1912, there were nine working coal mines, in Newcastle, Drumheller, Midland, Rosedale, and Wayne. In years to follow more mines sprang up: Nacmine, Cambria, Willow Creek, Lehigh, and East Coulee. The timing of the Drumheller mine industry was "lucky" according to the Atlas National Historical Site, in that the United Mine Workers union had recently won the right for better working conditions. As a result of union action, child labour laws were passed to prevent boys under 14 years old working underground.

Miners' camps in this area were called "hell's holes" because miners lived in tents and shacks. These camps were filled with drinking, gambling and watching fistfights as forms of recreation. With time, living conditions improved: little houses took the place of the tents, and more women joined the men and started families. With new activities such as hockey, baseball and theatre the camps were no longer "hell's holes" but became "the wonder town of the west."[citation needed]

Between 1911 and 1979, 139 mines were registered in the Drumheller Valley, of which only 34 were productive for many years. The beginning of the end for the Drumheller mining industry was the discovery of oil at Leduc No. 1 in 1947, after which natural gas became the predominant fuel for heating homes in western Canada. As the demand for coal dropped, mines closed and communities suffered. Some communities, Willow Creek for example, completely vanished while others went from boomtowns to ghost towns.

Atlas #4 Mine shipped its last load of coal in 1979, after which the Atlas Coal Mine National Historic Site has preserved the last of the Drumheller mines. Also nearby, East Coulee School Museum interprets the life of families in mine towns for its visitors.

== Chile ==
Historically, coal mining had some importance in the southern half of Chile from the 1850s to the 1990s with a brief revival in Invierno mine from 2013 to 2020.

As steamships traveled overseas from the industrialized countries of Europe their need for coal served as trigger for coal mining to start at various locations across the globe. An example of this is the coal mining in Zona Centro Sur, Chile, that began as a response to the arrival of steamships to Talcahuano. In 1864 the denial for the Spanish gunboat Vencedora to obtain coal in Chilean ports as she was heading to fight Peru contributed months later for Spain to declare war and drag Chile into the Chincha Islands War.

== China ==
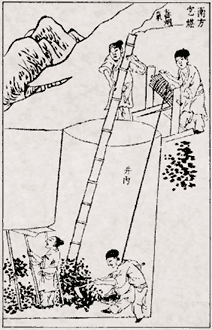
Chinese coal miners in an illustration of the Tiangong Kaiwu Ming Dynasty encyclopedia, published in 1637 by Song Yingxing

The coal industry in China goes back many centuries.

In recent decades it has become the main energy source of what (from 2010) is the world's second-largest economy. Thus, China is by far the largest producer of coal in the world, producing over 2.8 billion tons of coal in 2007, or approximately 39.8 percent of all coal produced in the world during that year.

For comparison, the second largest producer, the United States, produced more than 1.1 billion tons in 2007. An estimated 5 million people work in China's coal-mining industry. Unofficial estimates show as many as 20,000 miners die in accidents each year. A 2025 report from China stated that coal mines have had a 6.1% decrease in mining related deaths. Safety standards in locally run township coal mines often receive little government regulation, increasing the chance of harmful and fatal accidents among coal miners. Miners themselves are largely migrant and don't possess higher education, further exacerbating the risk factor for many in the coal mining industry. Most Chinese mines are deep underground and do not produce the surface disruption typical of strip mines.

Health coverage and safety measures for migrant coal miners are severely lacking in many Chinese coal mines. During an investigation of Hunan province in 2015, occupational pneumoconiosis rates among migrant workers in coal mines were found to be 98.31%. A fraction of coal miners were reported to have had used some form of injury insurance benefits, 20.8% receiving no compensation following a workplace injury.

Media products depicting the brutal working conditions of migrant Chinese coal miners do exist. Movies and documentaries such as To the Light: The Dark Days of China's Coal Miners, Blind Shaft, and Behemoth are all critically acclaimed, and equally censored, portrayals of the lives of the average migrant coal miner in China. The films themselves receive acclaim and awards from overseas, but are scrutinized heavily by the Chinese government for negative portrayals of it, China's economy, and Chinese society at large.

== France ==
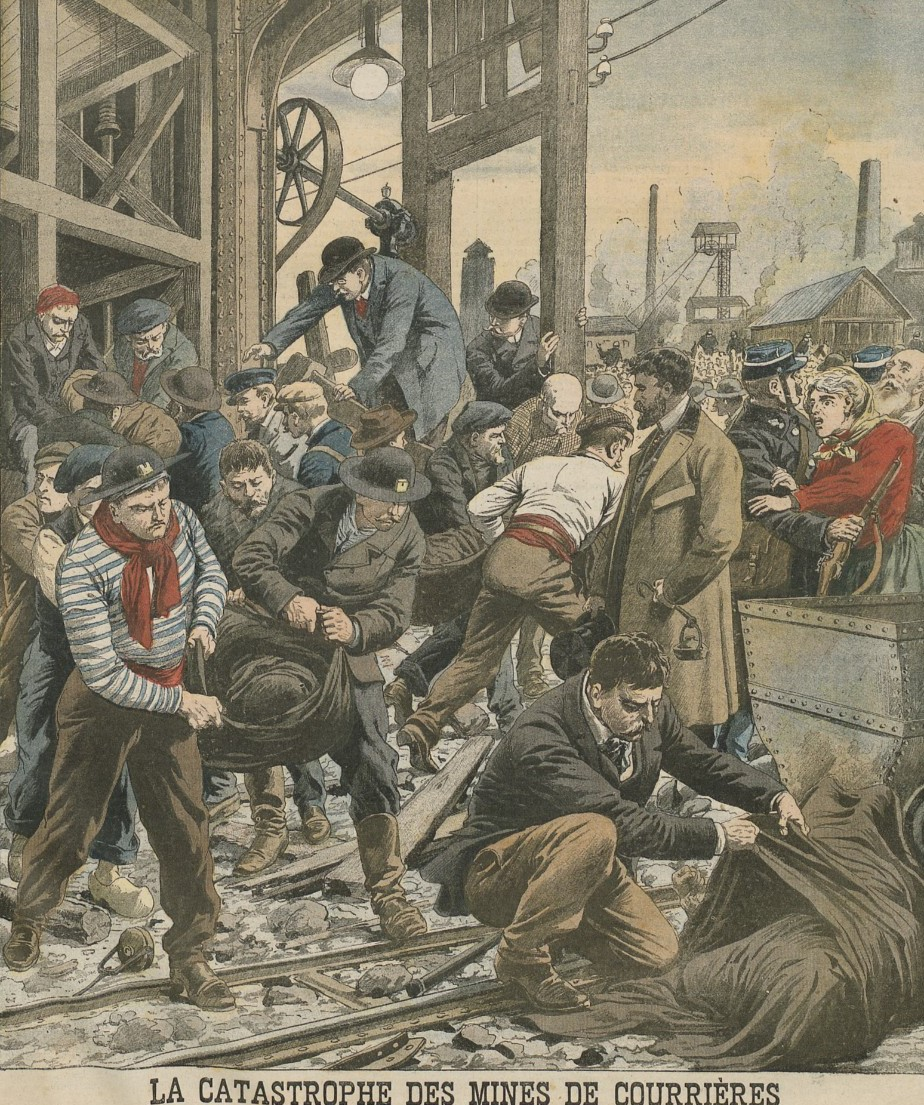
Le Petit Journal, the 1906 Courrières mine disaster in France

Pierre-François Tubeuf laid the foundations of the modern industry in France, starting in 1770 in Languedoc. Labor unions emerged with an emphasis on the safety issue in the late 19th century.

In 1885, there were 175 injuries per thousand workers per year. Deaths were relatively low in most years (2 per 1000 workers), but major disaster was always a threat. 1099 men died in the Courrières mine disaster of 1906. The campaign for mine safety enabled miners to break from their peasant psychology and create solidarity that came from sharing dangerous work, and to develop a working-class consciousness. Unions gained strength by setting up a system of worker-elected mine-safety delegates.

The national government encouraged the mine safety movement to limit strife in the sometimes turbulent coal fields. Nevertheless, strikes remained very common, and coal miners took the lead in political organization. Germany seized control of some mining districts in the First World War, leaving them devastated. Polish, Spanish, and other immigrants were brought in to provide a stable labor force at the end of the war.

== Germany ==
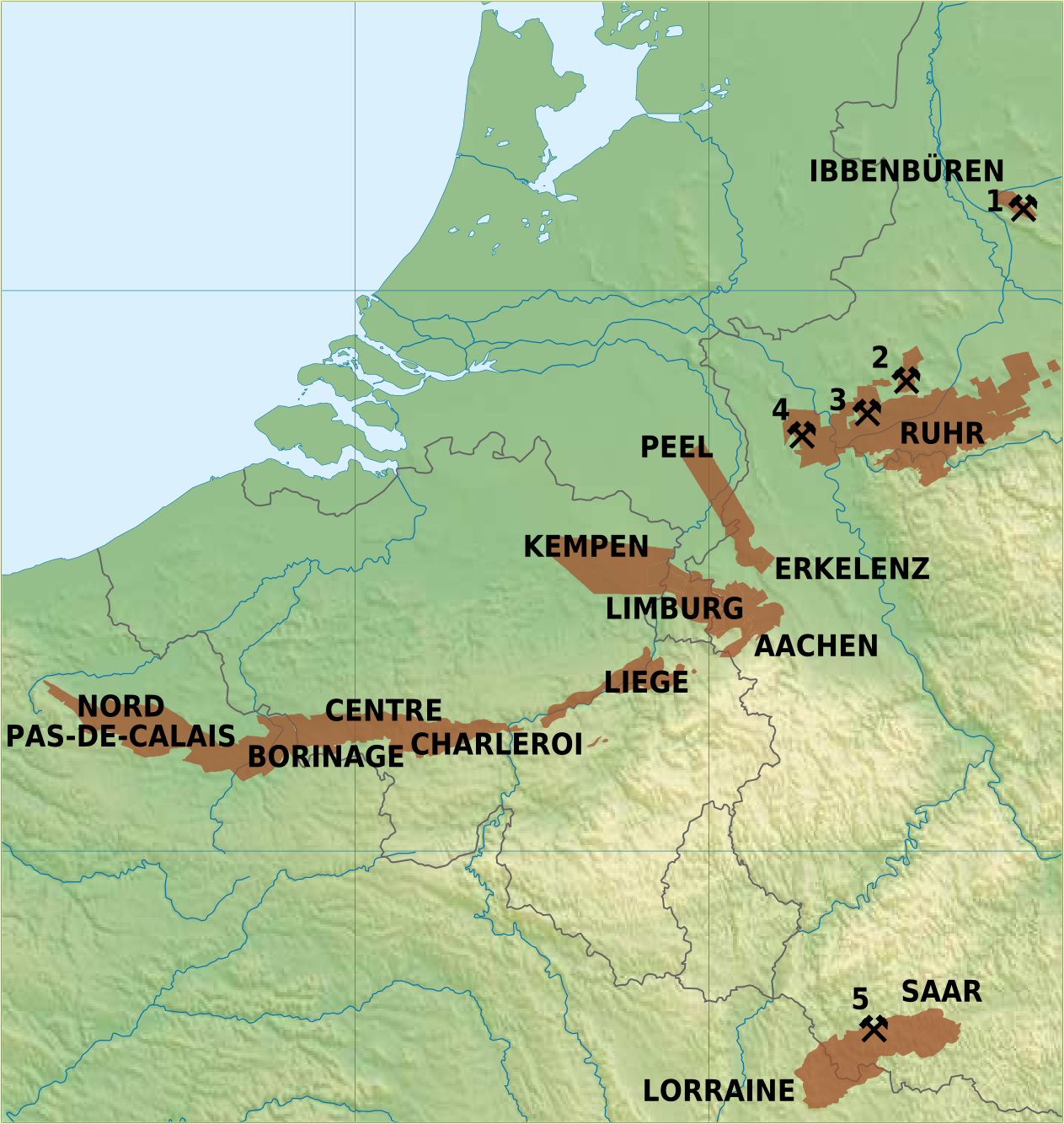
Historical coalfields of Western Germany, Belgium, The Netherlands and Northern France

The first important mines appeared in the 1750s, in the valleys of the rivers Ruhr, Inde and Wurm where coal seams outcropped and horizontal adit mining was possible. In 1782 the Krupp family began operations near Essen. After 1815 entrepreneurs in the Ruhr Area, which then became part of Prussia took advantage of the tariff zone (Zollverein) to open new mines and associated iron smelters. New railways were built by British engineers around 1850. Numerous small industrial centres sprang up, focused on ironworks, using local coal. The iron and steel works typically bought mines, and erected coking ovens to supply their own requirements in coke and gas. These integrated coal-iron firms ("Hüttenzechen") became numerous after 1854; after 1900 they became mixed firms called "Konzern".

The average output of a mine in 1850 was about 8,500 short tons (7,700 t); its employment about 64. By 1900, the average mine's output had risen to 280,000 short tons (250,000 t) and the employment to about 1,400.

Progression of total Ruhr coal output
Year	Amount (millions)	
Year	Short tons	Metric tons
1850	2.0	1.8
1880	22	20
1900	60	54
1913	114	103
1932	73	66
1940	130	118
1957	123	112
1974	78	71

At the end of 2010 five coal mines were producing in Germany. The last hard coal mine in Germany closed on December 21, 2018.

The miners in the Ruhr region were divided by ethnicity (with Germans and Poles) and religion (Protestants and Catholics). Mobility in and out of the mining camps to nearby industrial areas was high. The miners split into several unions, with an affiliation to a political party. As a result, the socialist union (affiliated with the Social Democratic Party) competed with Catholic and Communist unions until 1933, when the Nazis took over all of them. After 1945 the socialists came to the fore.

== India ==
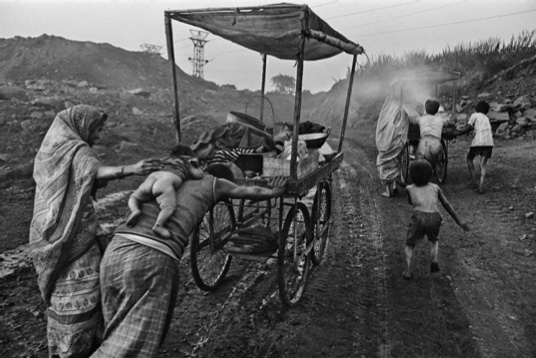
Coal mine, Dhanbad India

Coal was not known during the Mughal rule despite their contact with Europeans. Commercial exploitation began in 1774, John Sumner and Suetonius Grant Heatly of the East India Company setting up operations in the Raniganj Coalfield along the Western bank of river Damodar. Due to a lack of demand growth was sluggish until 1853, with the introduction of steam locomotives to the fast-expanding rail system.

As late as 1895, India imported large quantities of coal from Britain, but as domestic production increased and was found to be suitable for locomotives and ships, demand for coal imports declined dramatically. India's export of coal increased, especially to Burma, Ceylon, and the Malay states.

By 1900 production had risen to an annual average of 1 million tonne (mt) and India was producing 6.12 mts. per year by 1910 and 18 mts per year by 1920. Temporary wartime demand (1914–1918) was followed by a slump in the 1930s. The production reached a level of 29 mts. by 1942 and 30 mts. by 1946.

After India became independent, the new government stressed the rapid growth of heavy industry. The National Coal Development Corporation was founded in 1956 (as a Government of India undertaking). The founding of this body was major step in the development of an indigenous Indian coal sector. Especially important was the development of the vast Dhanbad coal-mining complex with such major operations as Tata Steel, BCCL, ECL and IISCO (Indian Iron And Steel Company), as well as the Indian School of Mines IIT (ISM) Dhanbad to train engineers, geologists and managers.

== Poland ==
The first permanent coal mine in Poland was established in Szczakowa near Jaworzno in 1767. In 19th century development of iron, copper and lead mining and processing in southern Poland (notably in the Old-Polish Industrial Region and later in the region of Silesia) led to a quick development of coal mining. Among the most prominent deposits are those located in what are now the Upper Silesian Industrial Region and Rybnik Coal Area (formerly part of Prussia) and the Zagłębie Dąbrowskie on the Russian side of the border.

In modern times coal is still considered a strategic resource for Poland's economy. It covers roughly 65% of energetic needs. Before and after World War II Poland has been one of the major coal producers worldwide, usually listed among the five largest. However, after 1989 the coal production is in decline, with the overall production for 1994 reaching 132 million metric tons, 112 million metric tons in 1999 and 104 million metric tons in 2002.

== Russia and Ukraine ==
=== Imperial Russia ===
Coal would start being mined on Sakhalin island by Russian concerns in the 1850s. From the 1860s, large deposits in the Donbas in southern Russia supplied 87% of Russia's coal. It was used by railways and the iron and steel industry. After 1900 smaller deposits near Dombrovo, Zabaikal and Cheremkhovo in Siberia were opened. South of Moscow, smaller mines were also in operation. Coal production was controlled by inefficient Russo-British syndicates, and there were shortages of workers, so the companies set up welfare systems for them. Their small output and the weak Russian railway system centered on the Ekaterininskaia (Krivoi Rog) Railway held back the growth of Russian heavy industry. Coal would be mined through convict labor in Sakhalin while the island functioned as a penal colony.

=== Soviet period ===
Sakhalin's Due coal mine c. 1924

With the start of the Russian Civil War in 1917, the Don basin and its mines would change hands between the White Army, Makhnovshchina and the Red Army before the latter would establish Soviet control in Donbas operation of 1919. In 1920, the Japanese occupation of northern Sakhalin resulted in Japanese firms such as Mitsubishi assuming control of Sakhalin's coal mines. Following Japan's withdrawal in 1925, they would retain coal concessions in northern Sakhalin for the next two decades.

In 1939 the Urals produced only half the fuel needed by local industry. Following Operation Barbarossa, the Soviet Union lost 60% of its mining areas to Nazi German occupation. This forced the rapid expansion of mines in the Ural Mountains as well as greater use of mines in the Kuznetsk Basin in Siberia. During the war the mines were expanded and over 700 factories were evacuated from the west, greatly increasing the demand for Ural coal. Prisoners from gulags were sent to the mines. Up to a third of the workers were women. The miners were given much higher rations of food. Output doubled and the share of the region in the total national coal production rose from 8% to 22%.

Experimental mining near Uglegorsk would begin in 1983. From 1989 to 1991, militant coal miners in Russia and Ukraine would oppose the Soviet system, which precipitated the collapse of the USSR.

=== 21st century ===
The Donets Basin continued to be major coal-mining district in eastern Ukraine and adjacent portions of Russia. Production yields in 2009 were 68.7 million tons in the Ukrainian portion and 4.9 million tons in the Russian part of the basin. By the 2010s, Illegal coal mines operated in the region. In 2011, the East Mining Company would be established to further exploit Sakhalin's coal resources.

Following the secession of the Donetsk and Luhansk People's Republics in 2014, the mines in those territories would fall under Russian control. During the Russo-Ukrainian War, both Russia and Ukraine would attack each other's mines.

== United Kingdom ==
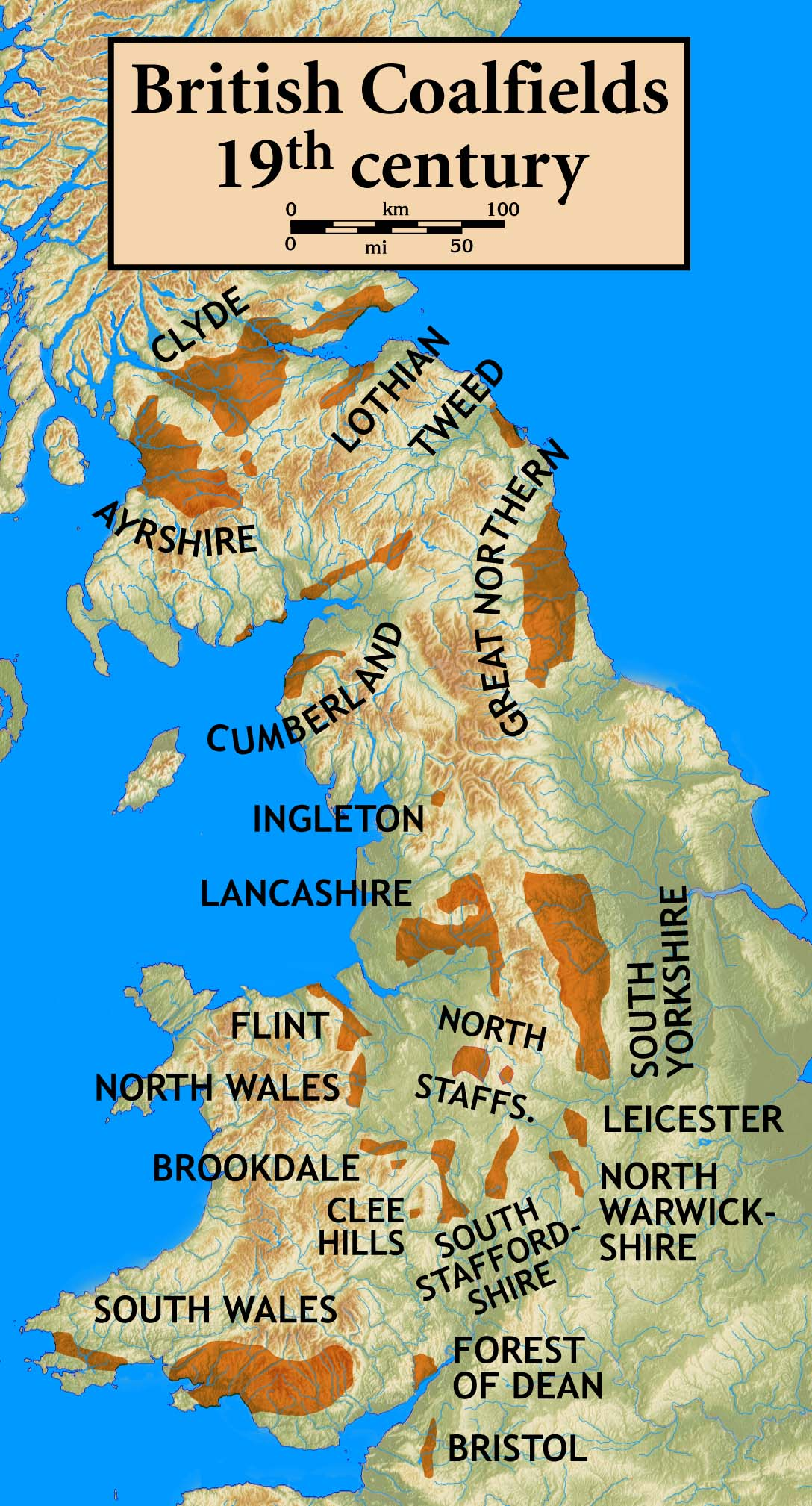
British coalfields in the nineteenth century

=== Before 1900 ===
Although some deep mining took place as early as the 1500s (in North East England, and along the Firth of Forth coast) deep shaft mining in the UK began to develop extensively in the late 18th century, with rapid expansion throughout the 19th century and early 20th century when the industry peaked. The location of the coalfields helped to make the prosperity of Lancashire, of Yorkshire, and of South Wales. The Yorkshire pits which supplied Sheffield were only about 300 feet deep. Northumberland and Durham were the leading coal producers and they were the sites of the first deep pits. In much of Britain coal was worked from drift mines, or scraped off when it outcropped on the surface. Small groups of part-time miners used shovels and primitive equipment.

Scottish miners had been bonded to their "maisters" by a 1606 Act "Anent Coalyers and Salters". A Colliers and Salters (Scotland) Act 1775, recognised this to be "a state of slavery and bondage" and formally abolished it; this was made effective by a further law in 1799.

Before 1800 a great deal of coal was left in place because extraction was still primitive. As a result, in the deep Tyneside pits (300 to 1,000 ft deep), only about 40 percent of the coal could be extracted. The use of wooden pit props to support the roof was an innovation first introduced about 1800. The critical factor was circulation of air and control of dangerous explosive gases. At first fires were burned at the bottom of the "upcast" shaft to create air currents and circulate air, but were replaced by fans driven by steam engines. Protection for miners came with the invention of the Davy lamp and Geordie lamp, where any firedamp (or methane) burnt harmlessly within the lamp. It was achieved by preventing the combustion spreading from the light chamber to the outside air with either metal gauze or fine tubes, but the illumination from such lamps was very poor. Great efforts were made to develop better safe lamps, such as the Mueseler produced in the Belgian pits near Liège.

Coal was so abundant in Britain that the supply could be stepped up to meet the rapidly rising demand. In 1700 the annual output of coal was just under 3 million tons. Between 1770 and 1780 the annual output of coal was some 6¼ million long tons (or about the output of a week and a half in the 20th century). After 1790 output soared, reaching 16 million long tons by 1815 at the height of the Napoleonic War. By 1830 this had risen to over 30 million tons The miners, less affected by imported labour or machines than were the cotton mill workers, had begun to form trade unions and fight their grim battle for wages against the coal owners and royalty-lessees.

Use of women and children (at a fraction of the cost of men) was common until abolished in an Act of August 1842.

In South Wales, the miners showed a high degree of solidarity. They lived in isolated villages where the miners comprised the great majority of workers. There was a high degree of equality in life style; combined with an evangelical religious style based on Methodism, leading to an ideology of egalitarianism. They forged a "community of solidarity" – under the leadership of the Miners Federation. The union supported first the Liberal Party, then after 1918 Labour, with some Communist Party activism at the fringes.

=== Since 1900 ===
The need to maintain coal supplies (a primary energy source) had figured in both world wars. As well as energy supply, coal became a very political issue, due to conditions under which colliers worked and the way they were treated by colliery owners. Much of the 'old Left' of British politics can trace its origins to coal-mining areas, with the main labour union being the Miners' Federation of Great Britain, founded in 1888. The MFGB claimed 600,000 members in 1908. (The MFGB later became the more centralised National Union of Mineworkers).

Although other factors were involved, one cause of the UK General Strike of 1926 was concerns colliers had over very dangerous working conditions, reduced pay and longer shifts.

Technological development throughout the 19th and 20th centuries helped both to improve the safety of colliers and the productive capacity of the collieries in which they worked. In the late 20th century, improved integration of coal extraction with bulk industries (such as electrical generation) helped coal maintain its position despite the emergence of alternative energy supplies such as oil, natural gas and, from the late 1950s, nuclear power. More recently coal has faced competition from renewable energy sources and bio-fuels.

Most of the coal mines in Britain were purchased by the government in 1947 and put under the control of the National Coal Board, with only the smaller mines left in private ownership. The NUM had campaigned for nationalisation for decades and, once it was achieved, sought to work with the NCB in managing the industry and discouraging strikes. Under the chairmanship of Alf Robens, pit closures became widespread as coal's place in energy generation declined. The NUM leadership continued to resist calls for strike action, but an unofficial strike began in 1969 after a conference pledge on the hours of surface-workers was not acted upon. This was a watershed moment that led to increased spending on the coal industry and a much slower rate of pit closures, as well as the election of more militant officials to the NUM leadership. Under the government of Edward Heath, an official strike in 1972 won increased wages after the Wilberforce Commission. Less than two years later, Heath called a general election over another official strike, called after an overtime ban had led to a Three-Day Week in Britain, and lost the election to the Labour Party. The wage demands were then met and spending on the industry continued to increase, including the establishment of the new Selby Coalfield.

By the early 1980s, many pits were almost 100 years old and were considered uneconomic to work at current wage rates compared to cheap North Sea oil and gas, and in comparison to subsidy levels in Europe. The miners' strike of 1984 failed to stop the Conservative government's plans under Margaret Thatcher to shrink the industry, and a break-away Union of Democratic Mineworkers was founded by miners, mostly in the Midlands, who felt that the NUM had broken its own democratic rules in calling the strike. The National Coal Board (by then British Coal), was privatised by selling off a large number of pits to private concerns through the mid-1990s. Because of exhausted seams, high prices and cheap imports, the mining industry disappeared almost completely, despite the militant protests of some miners.

In January 2008, the South Wales Valleys last deep pit mine, Tower Colliery in Hirwaun, Rhondda Cynon Taff closed with the loss of 120 jobs. The coal was exhausted. Until 2015 coal was still mined at Hatfield, Kellingley and Thoresby Collieries, and is extracted at several very large opencast pits in South Wales, Scotland and elsewhere. Kellingley Colliery was the last deep coal mine in operation in the UK and its last coaling shift was on 18 December 2015 when coaling operations ceased with the loss of 450 jobs bringing deep coal mining in the UK to an end in its entirety, a skeleton team of men will remain to service the colliery until it is finally dismantled.

Coal mining was never a major industry in Ireland, apart from a spell in the mid-19th century when east Tyrone collieries were at their peak. Deerpark Mines was the largest opencast site. In 1919, it got rail connections and reached peak production in the 1950s.

== United States ==
Anthracite (or "hard" coal), clean and smokeless, became the preferred fuel in cities, replacing wood by about 1850. Bituminous (or "soft coal") mining came later. In the mid-century Pittsburgh was the principal market. After 1850 soft coal, which is cheaper but dirtier, came into demand for railway locomotives and stationary steam engines, and was used to make coke for steel after 1870.

Total coal output soared until 1918; before 1890, it doubled every ten years, going from 8.4 million short tons (7.6 Mt) in 1850 to 40 million (36 Mt) in 1870, 270 million (240 Mt) in 1900, and peaking at 680 million short tons (620 Mt) in 1918. New soft coal fields opened in Ohio, Indiana and Illinois, as well as West Virginia, Kentucky and Alabama. The Great Depression of the 1930s lowered the demand to 360 million short tons (330 Mt) in 1932.

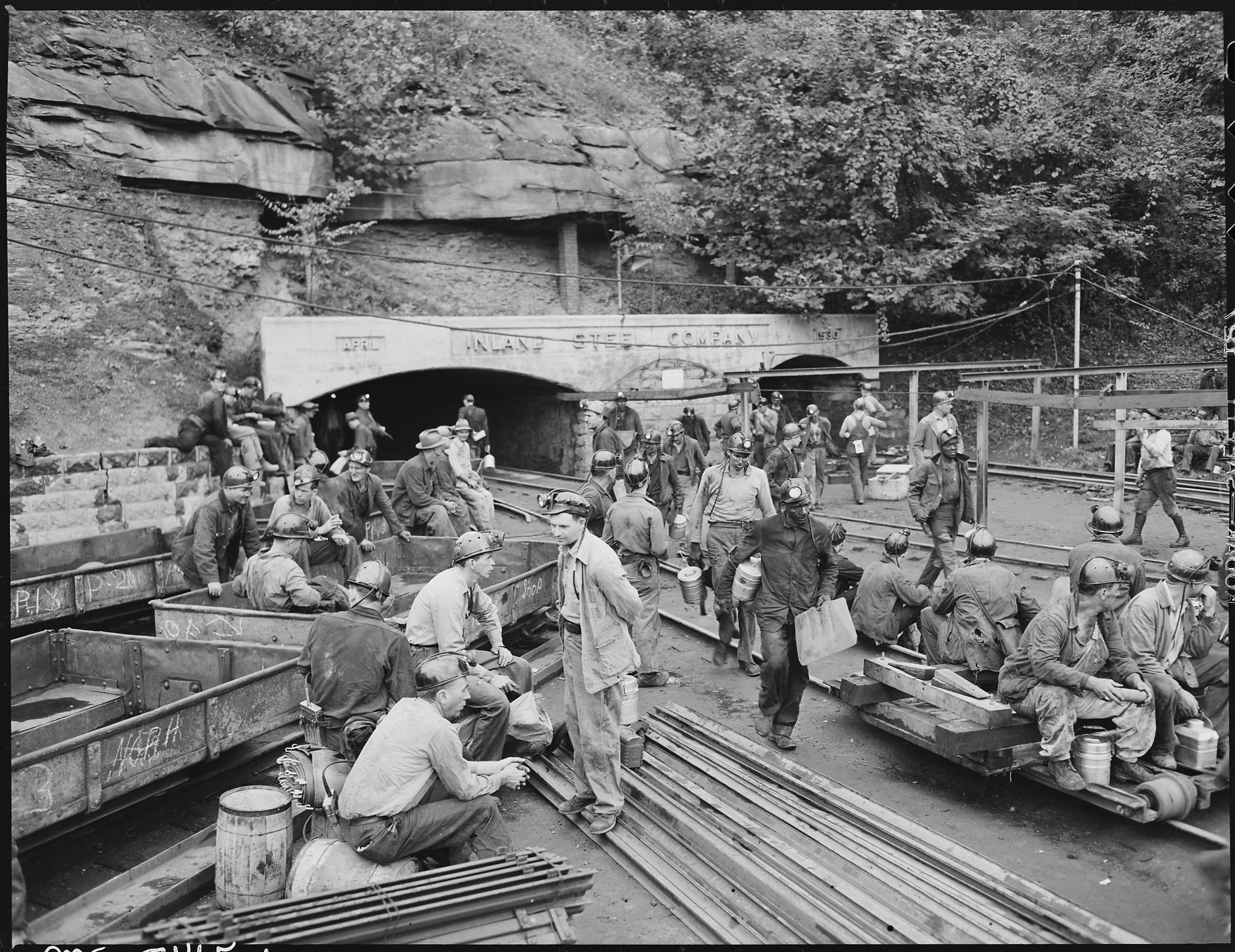
Changing shifts at the mine portal in the afternoon, Floyd County, Kentucky, 1946

Under John L. Lewis, the United Mine Workers (UMW) became the dominant force in the coal fields in the 1930s and 1940s, producing high wages and benefits. In 1914 at the peak there were 180,000 anthracite miners; by 1970 only 6,000 remained. At the same time steam engines were phased out in railways and factories, and bituminous coal was used primarily for the generation of electricity. Employment in bituminous peaked at 705,000 men in 1923, falling to 140,000 by 1970 and 70,000 in 2003. UMW membership among active miners fell from 160,000 in 1980 to only 16,000 in 2005, as coal mining became more mechanized and non-union miners predominated in the new coal fields.

In the 1960s a series of mergers saw coal production shift from small, independent coal companies to large, more diversified firms. Several oil companies and electricity producers acquired coal companies or leased Federal coal reserves in the west of the United States. Concerns that competition in the coal industry could decline as a result of these changes were heightened by a sharp rise in coal prices in the wake of the 1973 oil crisis. Coal prices fell in the 1980s, partly in response to oil price movements, but primarily in response to the large increase in supply worldwide which was brought about by the earlier price surge. During this period, the industry in the U.S. was characterized by a move towards low-sulfur coal.

In 1987 Wyoming became the largest coal producing state. It uses strip mining exclusively. Wyoming's coal reserves total about 69.3 billion short tons (62.9 Pg), or 14.2% of the U.S. coal reserve.

In 2008, competition was intense in the US coal mining industry with some U.S. mines approaching the end of their useful life (mine closure). Other coal-producing countries also stepped up production to win a share of traditional US export markets. Coal is used primarily to generate electricity, but the rapid drop in natural gas prices after 2008 created severe competition.

== Other countries ==
In the 21st century, Indonesia has expanded its coal mining and by 2011 ranked #5 globally in production. By 2011 Kazakhstan ranks in the top ten in terms of coal production and reserves. Lignite ("brown coal") remains important with Germany, China and Russia the largest producers.

== Disasters ==
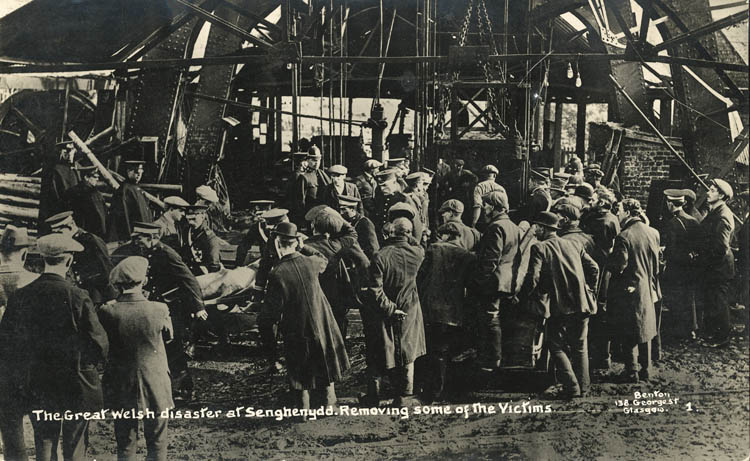
Removing bodies from the pit at Senghenydd, 1913

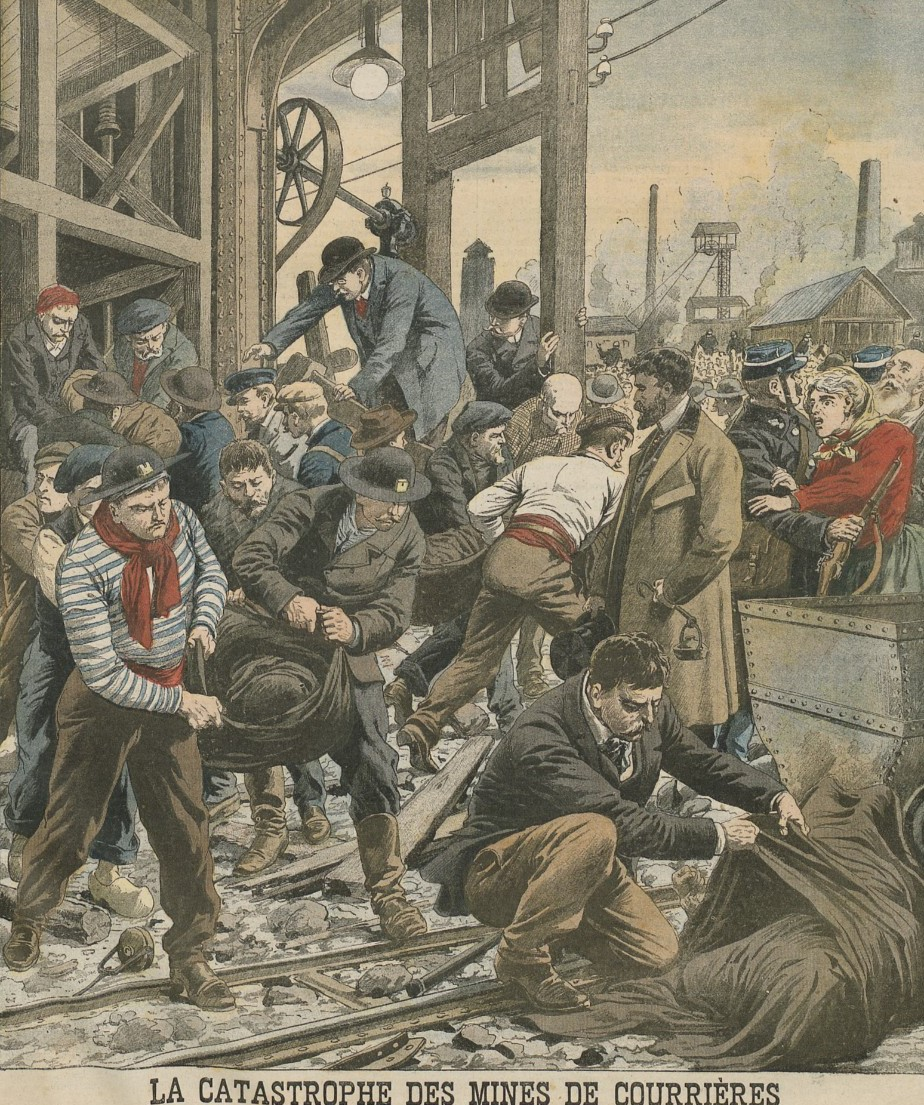
The Courrières mine disaster in France in 1906

Mining has always been especially dangerous, because of explosions, roof cave-ins, and the difficulty of underground rescue. The worst single disaster in British coal mining history was at Senghenydd in the South Wales coalfield. On the morning of 14 October 1913 an explosion and subsequent fire killed 436 men and boys. Only 72 bodies were recovered. It followed a series of many extensive Mining accidents in the late 19th century, such as The Oaks explosion of 1866 and the Hartley Colliery Disaster of 1862. Most of the explosions were caused by firedamp ignitions followed by coal dust explosions. At Hartley there was no explosion, but the miners entombed when the single shaft was blocked by a broken cast iron beam from the haulage engine. Deaths were mainly caused by carbon monoxide poisoning, known as afterdamp.

Mitsubishi Hojyo coal mine disaster, occurred on 15 December 1914 at the Mitsubishi Hojyo coal mine located in the Kyushu Island of Japan. The disaster directly led to the deaths of 687, representing the worst mining incident in Japanese history.

The Courrières mine disaster, Europe's worst mining accident, caused the death of 1,099 miners in Northern France on 10 March 1906. The Benxihu Colliery accident in China on April 26, 1942, killed 1,549 miners.

As well as disasters directly affecting mines, there have been disasters attributable to the impact of mining on the surrounding landscapes and communities. The Aberfan disaster in 1966 buried a school in South Wales when a huge slag heap collapsed, killing 116 children and 28 adults.

== See also ==
- Coal mining
- History of coal miners
- Mining disasters
- Child labour in coal mines

== Bibliography ==
- Freese, Barbara, Coal: A Human History (2004).
- Jeffrey, E. C. Coal and Civilization 1925.

=== Current conditions ===
- Burns, Daniel. The modern practice of coal mining (1907)
- Chirons, Nicholas P. Coal Age Handbook of Coal Surface Mining (ISBN 0-07-011458-7)
- Hamilton, Michael S. Mining Environmental Policy: Comparing Indonesia and the USA (Burlington, VT: Ashgate, 2005). (ISBN 0-7546-4493-6).
- Hayes, Geoffrey. Coal Mining (2004), 32 pp
- Hughes. Herbert W, A Text-Book of Mining: For the use of colliery managers and others (London, many editions 1892–1917), the standard British textbook for its era.
- Kuenzer, Claudia. Coal Mining in China (In: Schumacher-Voelker, E., and Mueller, B., (Eds.), 2007: BusinessFocus China, Energy: A Comprehensive Overview of the Chinese Energy Sector. gic Deutschland Verlag, 281 pp., ISBN 978-3-940114-00-6 pp. 62–68)
- National Energy Information Center. "Greenhouse Gases, Climate Change, Energy".
- Charles V. Nielsen and George F. Richardson. 1982 Keystone Coal Industry Manual (1982)
- Saleem H. Ali. "Minding our Minerals, 2006."
- Speight, James G, "An Introduction to Petroleum Technology, Economics, and Politics," John Wiley & Sons 2011.
- A.K. Srivastava. Coal Mining Industry in India (1998) (ISBN 81-7100-076-2)
- Tonge, James. The principles and practice of coal mining (1906)
- Trade and Industry, UK Department of. "The Coal Authority". Archived from the original on 2008-10-13.
- World Coal Institute. The cOaL Resource (2005) covers all aspects of the coal industry in 48 pp; online version
- Woytinsky, W. S., and E. S. Woytinsky. World Population and Production Trends and Outlooks (1953) pp 840–881; with many tables and maps on the worldwide coal industry in 1950

=== Britain ===
==== Scholarly histories ====
- Ashton, T. S. & Sykes, J. The coal industry of the eighteenth century. 1929.
- Baylies, Carolyn. History of the Yorkshire Miners 1881–1918 (Routledge, 2003) in England online.
- Benson, John. "Coalmining" in Chris Wrigley, ed. A History of British industrial relations, 1875–1914 (Univ of Massachusetts Press, 1982), pp 187–208.
- Benson, John. British Coal-Miners in the Nineteenth Century: A Social History (Holmes & Meier, (1980)
- Buxton, N.K. The economic development of the British coal industry: from Industrial Revolution to the present day. 1979.
- Dron, Robert W. The economics of coal mining (1928).
- Faull, Margaret L. "Coal mining and the landscape of England, 1700 to the present day." Landscape History 30.1 (2008): 59–74.
- Fine, B. The Coal Question: Political Economy and Industrial Change from the Nineteenth Century to the Present Day (1990).
- Galloway, R.L. Annals of coal mining and the coal trade. First series [to 1835] 1898; Second series. [1835–80] 1904. Reprinted 1971. Online at the University of Illinois
- Galloway, Robert Lindsay (1882). A history of coal mining in Great Britain. OL 6738976W.
- Griffin, A. R. The British coalmining industry: retrospect and prospect. 1977.
- Hatcher, John, et al. The History of the British Coal Industry (5 vol, Oxford U.P., 1984–87); 3000 pages of scholarly history
  - Hatcher, John (1993). The History of the British Coal Industry: Volume 1: Before 1700. doi:10.1093/acprof:oso/9780198282822.001.0001. ISBN 0-19-828282-6.
  - Michael W. Flinn, and David Stoker. History of the British Coal Industry: Volume 2. 1700–1830: The Industrial Revolution (1984).
  - Roy Church, Alan Hall and John Kanefsky. History of the British Coal Industry: Volume 3: Victorian Pre-Eminence
  - Barry Supple. The History of the British Coal Industry: Volume 4: 1913–1946: The Political Economy of Decline (1988) excerpt and text search
  - William Ashworth and Mark Pegg. History of the British Coal Industry: Volume 5: 1946–1982: The Nationalized Industry (1986)
- Heinemann, Margot. Britain's coal: A study of the mining crisis (1944).
- Hill, Alan. Coal – a Chronology for Britain. Northern Mine Research Society. Archived from the original on 2014-02-20.
- Hull, Edward (1861). The coal-fields of Great Britain: their history, structure, and resources. London: Stanford.
- Hull, Edward. Our coal resources at the close of the nineteenth century by Edward Hull. OL 1556578W.
- Jaffe, James Alan. The Struggle for Market Power: Industrial Relations in the British Coal Industry, 1800–1840 (2003).
- Jevons, H.S. The British coal trade. 1920, reprinted 1969
- Jevons, W. Stanley. The Coal Question: An Inquiry Concerning the Progress of the Nation, and the Probable Exhaustion of Our Coal Mines (1865).
- Kirby, M.W. The British coalmining industry, 1870–1946: a political and economic history. (1977).
- Kirby, Peter Thomas. "Aspects of the employment of children in the British coal-mining industry, 1800–1872" (PhD. Diss. University of Sheffield, 1995) online.
- Laslett, J. H. M. (1982). "The Independent Collier: Some Recent Studies of Nineteenth Century Coalmining Communities in Britain and the United States". International Labor and Working-Class History. 21 (21): 18–27. doi:10.1017/S0147547900007420. JSTOR 27671394.
- Lewis, B. Coal mining in the eighteenth and nineteenth centuries. Longman, 1971.
- Lucas, Arthur F. (1934). "A British Experiment in the Control of Competition: The Coal Mines Act of 1930". The Quarterly Journal of Economics. 48 (3): 418–441. doi:10.2307/1882822. JSTOR 1882822.
  - Prest, Wilfred (1936). "The British Coal Mines Act of 1930, Another Interpretation". The Quarterly Journal of Economics. 50 (2): 313–332. doi:10.2307/1885026. JSTOR 1885026.
- Merrill, Travers, and Lucy Kitson. End of Coal Mining in South Wales: Lessons learned from industrial transformation. (International Institute for Sustainable Development, 2017) online
- Mitchell, Brian R. Economic development of the British coal industry 1800–1914 (Cambridge UP, 1984). online
- Nef, J. U. Rise of the British coal industry. 2v 1932, a comprehensive scholarly survey
- Orwell, George. "Down the Mine" (The Road to Wigan Pier chapter 2, 1937) full text
- Rowe, J.W.F. Wages In the coal industry (1923).
- Supple, Barry. "The political economy of demoralization: the state and the coalmining industry in America and Britain between the wars." Economic History Review 41.4 (1988): 566–591.
- Turnheim, Bruno, and Frank W. Geels. "The destabilisation of existing regimes: Confronting a multi-dimensional framework with a case study of the British coal industry (1913–1967)." Research Policy 42.10 (2013): 1749–1767. online
- Waller, Robert. The Dukeries Transformed: A history of the development of the Dukeries coal field after 1920 (Oxford U.P., 1983) on the Dukeries
- Williams, Chris. Capitalism, community and conflict: The south Wales coalfield, 1898–1947 (U of Wales Press, 1998).

==== Bibliographic guides ====
- Benson, J., Thompson, C.H. & Neville, R.G. Bibliography of the British coal industry. 1981
- British Library Coal mining (Social Sciences Collection Guides: Topical Bibliographies)
- Galloway, R.L. Annals of coal mining and the coal trade. v1 of the 1971 reprint has a bibliography in the introduction.
- Linsley, S.M. The Coal Industry – A Select Bibliography. Durham Mining Museum
- Mining History Network Bibliography of British Mining History: Published Since 1987. Despite the title there is earlier material included.
- North of England Institute of Mining and Mechanical Engineers. Nicholas Wood Memorial Library. History of mining in the UK: some useful books. 2018

=== United States ===
==== Industry ====
- Adams, Sean Patrick, . "The US Coal Industry in the Nineteenth Century." EH.Net Encyclopedia, August 15, 2001 scholarly overview; online
- Adams, Sean Patrick (January 2006). "Promotion, Competition, Captivity: The Political Economy of Coal". Journal of Policy History. 18 (1): 74–95. doi:10.1353/jph.2005.0026. Project MUSE 190878.
- Adams, Sean Patrick. Old Dominion, Industrial Commonwealth: Coal, Politics, and Economy in Antebellum America. Johns Hopkins University Press, 2004.
- Binder, Frederick Moore. Coal Age Empire: Pennsylvania Coal and Its Utilization to 1860. Harrisburg: Pennsylvania Historical and Museum Commission, 1974.
- Chandler, Alfred D. (1972). "Anthracite Coal and the Beginnings of the Industrial Revolution in the United States". The Business History Review. 46 (2): 141–181. doi:10.2307/3113503. JSTOR 3113503.
- Conley, Phil. History of West Virginia Coal Industry (Charleston: Education Foundation, 1960)
- Davies, Edward J., II. The Anthracite Aristocracy: Leadership and Social Change in the Hard Coal Regions of Northeastern Pennsylvania, 1800–1930 (1985).
- DiCiccio, Carmen. Coal and Coke in Pennsylvania. Harrisburg: Pennsylvania Historical and Museum Commission, 1996
- Eavenson, Howard. The First Century and a Quarter of the American Coal Industry 1942.
- Flores, Verla R.; Gardner, A. Dudley (1989). Forgotten Frontier: A History of Wyoming Coal Mining. Archived from the original on May 16, 2010 – via Questia.
- Hudson Coal Company. The Story of Anthracite (New York, 1932), 425pp; Useful overview of the industry in the 20th century; fair-minded with an operators perspective
- Lauver, Fred J. "A Walk Through the Rise and Fall of Anthracite Might", Pennsylvania Heritage Magazine 27#1 (2001) online edition
- Long, Priscilla. Where the Sun Never Shines: A History of America's Bloody Coal Industry. Paragon House, 1989.
- Matheis, Mike (December 2016). "Local Economic Impacts of Coal Mining in the United States 1870 to 1970". The Journal of Economic History. 76 (4): 1152–1181. doi:10.1017/S002205071600098X.
- Nelson, Robert H. The Making of Federal Coal Policy (1983)
- Netschert, Bruce C.; Schurr, Sam H. (1960). Energy in the American Economy, 1850–1975: An Economic Study of Its History and Prospects. Archived from the original on May 2, 2010 – via Questia.
- Parker, Glen Lawhon. The Coal Industry: A Study in Social Control (Washington: American Council on Public Affairs, 1940)
- Powell, H. Benjamin. Philadelphia's First Fuel Crisis. Jacob Cist and the Developing Market for Pennsylvania Anthracite. The Pennsylvania State University Press, 1978.
- Rottenberg, Dan (2003). In the Kingdom of Coal: An American Family and the Rock That Changed the World. Archived from the original on November 3, 2011 – via Questia.
- Schurr, Sam H., and Bruce C. Netschert. Energy in the American Economy, 1850–1975: An Economic Study of Its History and Prospects. Johns Hopkins Press, 1960.
- Supple, Barry (1988). "The Political Economy of Demoralization: The State and the Coalmining Industry in America and Britain between the Wars". The Economic History Review. 41 (4): 566–591. doi:10.2307/2596602. JSTOR 2596602.
- Veenstra, Theodore A.; Fritz, Wilbert G. (1936). "Major Economic Tendencies in the Bituminous Coal Industry". The Quarterly Journal of Economics. 51 (1): 106–130. doi:10.2307/1882503. JSTOR 1882503.
- Vietor, Richard H. K. and Martin V. Melosi; Environmental Politics and the Coal Coalition Texas A&M University Press, 1980 online
- Warren, Kenneth. Triumphant Capitalism: Henry Clay Frick and the Industrial Transformation of America. Pittsburgh: University of Pittsburgh Press, 1996.

==== Primary sources ====
- United States Anthracite Coal Strike Commission, 1902–1903, Report to the President on the Anthracite Coal Strike of May–October, 1902 By United States Anthracite Coal Strike (1903) online edition
- Report of the United states coal commission.... (5 vol in 3; 1925) Official US government investigation of the 1922 anthracite strike. online vol 1–2
  - Tryon, Frederick Gale, and Joseph Henry Willits, eds. What the Coal Commission Found: An Authoritative Summary by the Staff (1925).
  - General policies committee of anthracite operators. The anthracite coal strike of 1922: A statement of its causes and underlying purposes (1923); Official statement by the operators. online

==== Coal miners, unions and strikes ====
- Arnold, Andrew B. Fueling the Gilded Age: Railroads, Miners, and Disorder in Pennsylvania Coal Country (2014)
- Aurand, Harold W. Coalcracker Culture: Work and Values in Pennsylvania Anthracite, 1835–1935 (2003).
- Baratz, Morton S. The Union and the Coal Industry (Yale University Press, 1955)
- Blatz, Perry. Democratic Miners: Work and Labor Relations in the Anthracite Coal Industry, 1875–1925. Albany: SUNY Press, 1994.
- Campolieti, Michele (April 2021). "Strikes in British Coal Mining, 1893–1940: Testing Models of Strikes". Industrial Relations: A Journal of Economy and Society. 60 (2): 243–273. doi:10.1111/irel.12276.
- Outram, Q.; Church, R. (2000). British Coal Mining Strikes, 1893-1940 (Report). UK Data Service. doi:10.5255/UKDA-SN-3899-1.
- Coal Mines Administration, U.S. Department Of The Interior. A Medical Survey of the Bituminous-Coal Industry. (U.S. Government Printing Office. 1947)
- Coleman, McAlister. Men and coal (1943) a wide-ranging popular history. online
- Corbin, David Alan Life, Work, and Rebellion in the Coal Fields: The Southern West Virginia Miners, 1880–1922 (1981)
- Dix, Keith. What's a Coal Miner to Do? The Mechanization of Coal Mining (1988), changes in the coal industry prior to 1940
- Dubofsky, Melvyn and Warren Van Tine, John L. Lewis: A Biography (1977), leader of Mine Workers union, 1920–1960
- Eller, Ronald D. Miners, Millhands, and Mountaineers: Industrialization of the Appalachian South, 1880–1930 1982.
- Fishback, Price V. Soft Coal, Hard Choices: The Economic Welfare of Bituminous Coal Miners, 1890–1930 (1992)
- Grossman, Jonathan. "The Coal Strike of 1902 – Turning Point in U.S. Policy" Monthly Labor Review October 1975. online
- Harvey, Katherine. The Best Dressed Miners: Life and Labor in the Maryland Coal Region, 1835–1910. Cornell University Press, 1993.
- Hinrichs; A. F. The United Mine Workers of America, and the Non-Union Coal Fields (Columbia University, 1923
- Lantz; Herman R. People of Coal Town (Columbia University Press, 1958; on southern Ill

inois.

- Laslett, John H.M. ed. The United Mine Workers: A Model of Industrial Solidarity? Penn State University Press, 1996.
- Laslett, J. H. M. (1982). "The Independent Collier: Some Recent Studies of Nineteenth Century Coalmining Communities in Britain and the United States". International Labor and Working-Class History. 21 (21): 18–27. doi:10.1017/S0147547900007420. JSTOR 27671394.
- Lewis, Ronald L. Black Coal Miners in America: Race, Class, and Community Conflict. University Press of Kentucky, 1987.
- Lewis, Ronald L. Welsh Americans: A History of Assimilation in the Coalfields (UNC press, 2015)
- Lunt, Richard D. Law and Order vs. the Miners: West Virginia, 1907–1933 Archon Books, 1979, On labor conflicts of the early 20th century.
- Lynch, Edward A. and David J. McDonald.Coal and Unionism: A History of the American Coal Miners' Unions (1939)
- McIntosh, Robert. Boys in the pits: Child labour in coal mines (McGill-Queen's Press-MQUP, 2000), Canadian mines
- Phelan, Craig. Divided Loyalties: The Public and Private Life of Labor Leader John Mitchell (1994)
- Rössel, Jörg (2002). "Industrial Structure, Union Strategy, and Strike Activity in American Bituminous Coal Mining, 1881-1894". Social Science History. 26 (1): 1–32. doi:10.1017/S014555320001227X. Project MUSE 32200 ProQuest 213874197.
- Roy, Andrew. A history of the coal miners of the United States, from the development of the mines to the close of the anthracite strike of 1902, including a brief sketch of early British miners (1907) online
- Seltzer, Curtis. Fire in the Hole: Miners and Managers in the American Coal Industry University Press of Kentucky, 1985, conflict in the coal industry to the 1980s.
- Trotter Jr., Joe William. Coal, Class, and Color: Blacks in Southern West Virginia, 1915–32 (1990)
- U.S. Immigration Commission, Report on Immigrants in Industries, Part I: Bituminous Coal Mining, 2 vols. Senate Document no. 633, 61st Cong., 2nd sess. (1911)
- Wallace, Anthony F.C. St. Clair. A Nineteenth-Century Coal Town's Experience with a Disaster-Prone Industry. Knopf, 1981.
- Ward, Robert D. and William W. Rogers, Labor Revolt in Alabama: The Great Strike of 1894 (University of Alabama Press, 1965); on the coal strike

=== China ===
- Dorian, James P. Minerals, Energy, and Economic Development in China Clarendon Press, 1994
- Huaichuan Rui; Globalisation, Transition and Development in China: The Case of the Coal Industry (Routledge, 2004)
- Thomson; Elspeth. The Chinese Coal Industry: An Economic History (Routledge 2003)
- Wu, Shellen Xiao. Empires of Coal: Fueling China's Entry into the Modern World Order, 1860–1920 (Stanford University Press, 2015) 266 pp. online review

=== Europe ===
- Parnell, Martin F. (1998). The German Tradition of Organized Capitalism: Self-Government in the Coal Industry. Oxford University Press Inc. Archived from the original on January 15, 2011 – via Questia.
- Pounds, Norman J. G.; Parker, William N. (1957). Coal and Steel in Western Europe; the Influence of Resources and Techniques on Production. Indiana University Press. Archived from the original on January 15, 2011 – via Questia.
- Pounds, Norman J. G. An Historical Geography of Europe, 1800–1914 (1993)
- Pounds, Norman J. G. The Ruhr: A Study in Historical and Economic Geography (1952) online

=== Other ===
- Calderón, Roberto R. Mexican Coal Mining Labor in Texas & Coahuila, 1880–1930 (2000) 294 pp.
- Frank, David. J. B. McLachlan: A Biography: The Story of a Legendary Labour Leader and the Cape Breton Coal Miners, (1999), in Canada
- Marsden, Susan, Coals to Newcastle: a History of Coal Loading at the Port of Newcastle, New South Wales 1797–1997 (2002) ISBN 0-9578961-9-0; Australia
- Nimura Kazuo, Andrew Gordon, and Terry Boardman; The Ashio Riot of 1907: A Social History of Mining in Japan. Duke University Press, 1997.
