= History of coal mining in the United States =

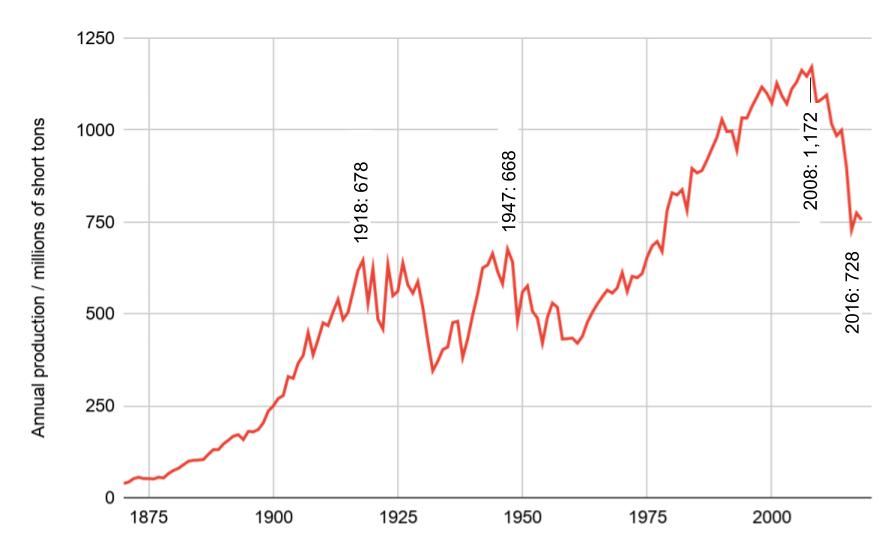
Total US coal production, 1870–2018

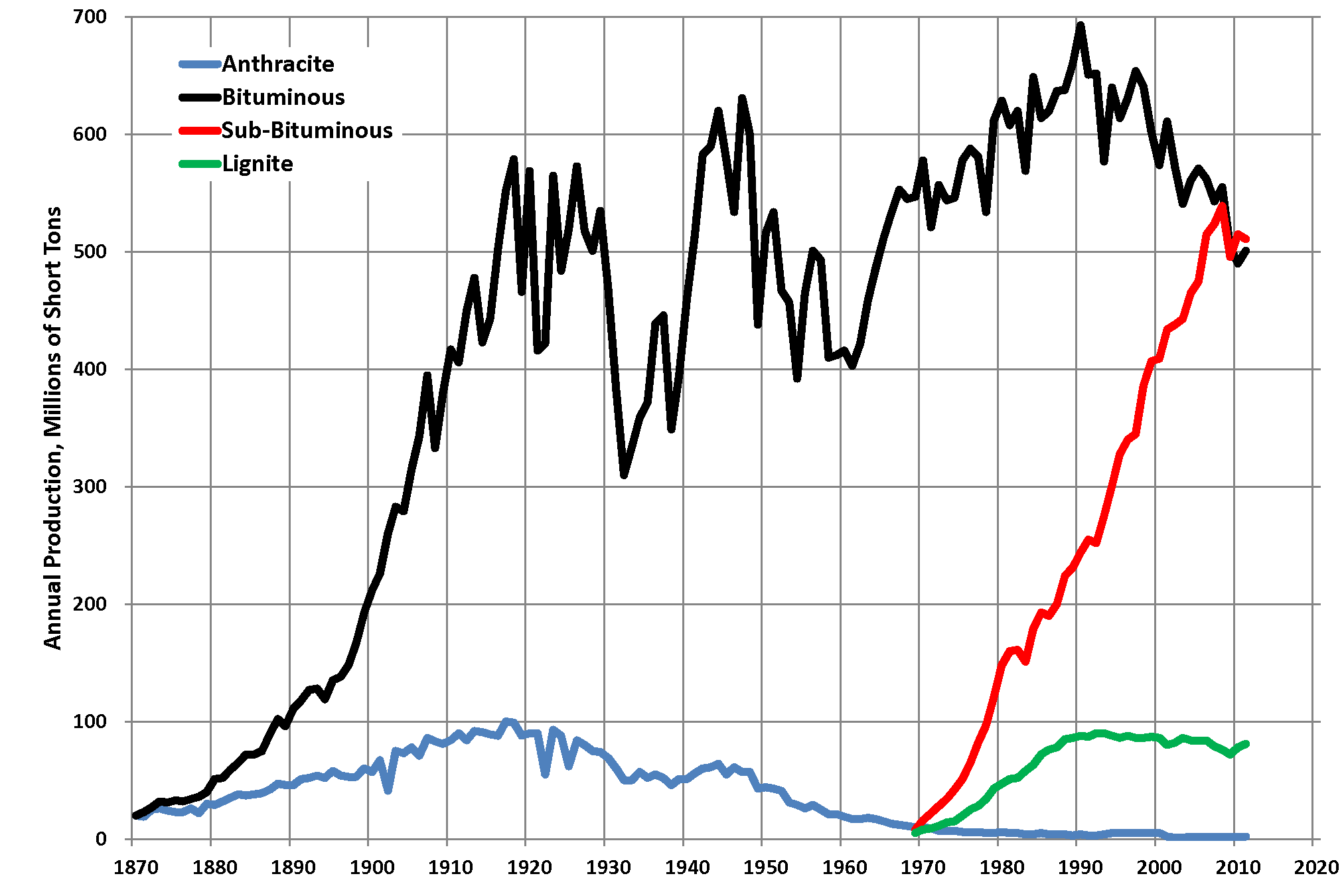
US Annual coal production by coal rank.

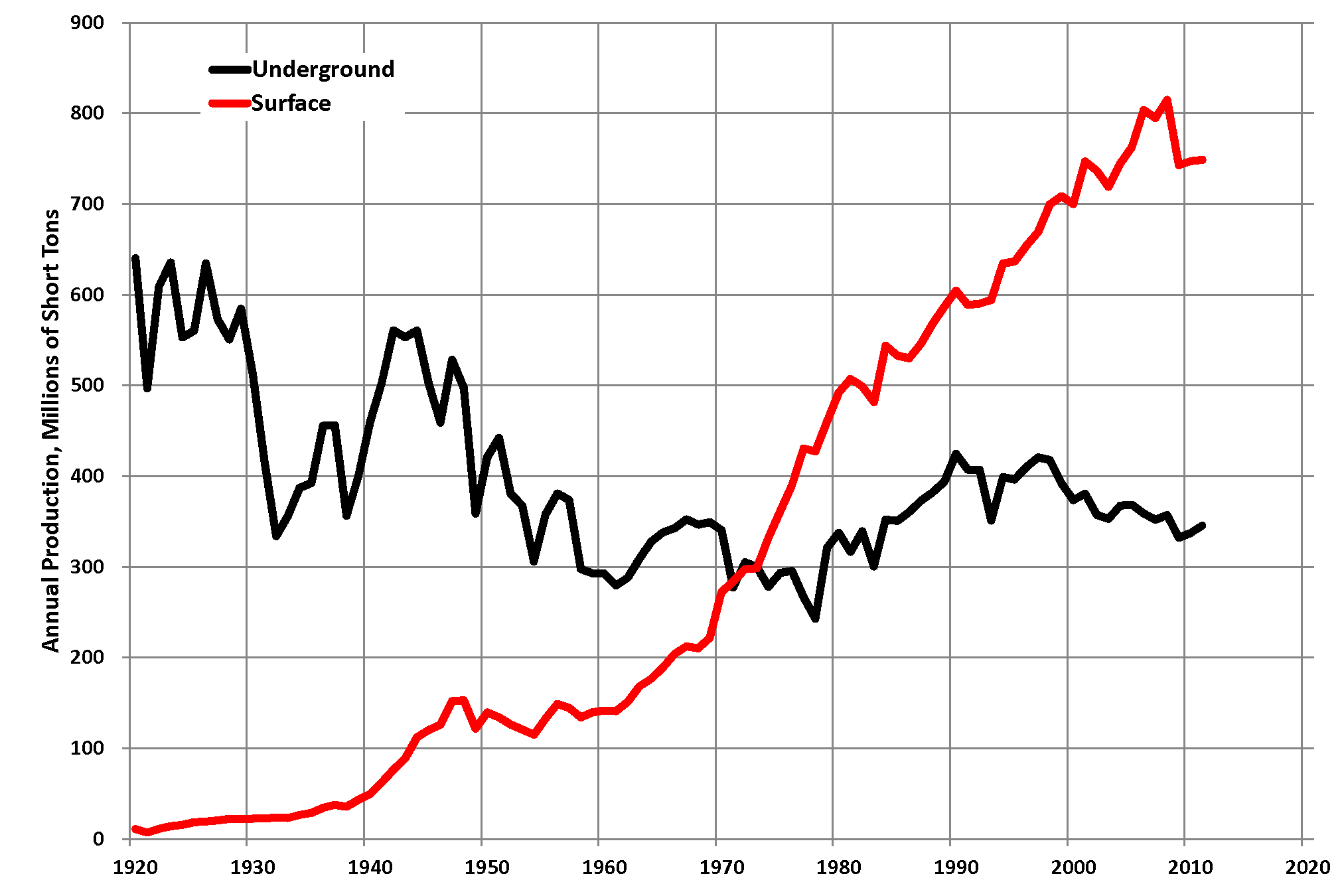
Trends in surface versus underground mining of coal in the US

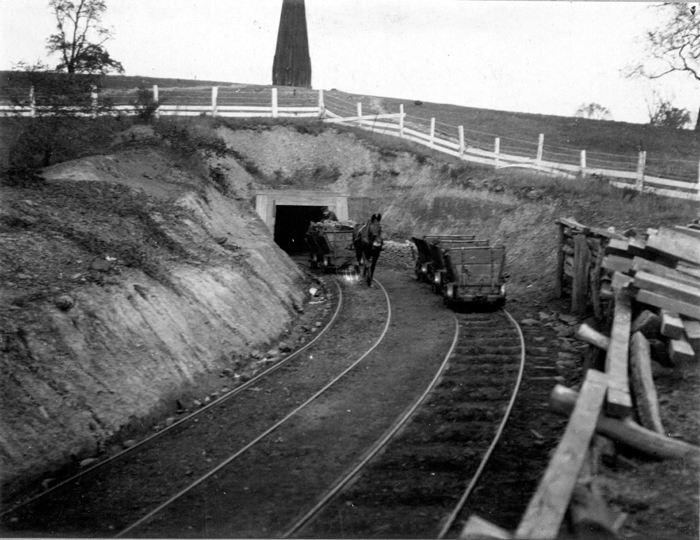
Bowman Company coal mine, Indiana County, Pennsylvania, 1904.

The history of coal mining in the United States starts with the first commercial use in 1701, within the Manakin-Sabot area of Richmond, Virginia. Coal was the dominant power source in the late 19th century and the early 20th century, and although in rapid decline it remains a significant source of energy in 2025.

Coal became the largest source of energy in the 1880s, when it overtook wood, and remained the largest source until the early 1950s, when coal was exceeded by petroleum. Coal provided more than half of the nation's energy from the 1880s to the 1940s, and from 1906 to 1920 provided more than three-quarters of US energy.

== 19th century ==
At the start of the 19th century, coal mining was almost all bituminous coal. In 1810, 176,000 short tons of bituminous coal, and 2,000 tons of anthracite coal, were mined in the United States. American coal mining grew rapidly in the early 1820s, doubling or tripling every decade. Anthracite mining overtook bituminous coal mining in the 1840s; from 1843 through 1868, more anthracite was mined than bituminous coal. But the more limited deposits of anthracite could not satisfy the increasing demand for coal; from 1869, bituminous coal was the dominant grade of coal mined. Another reason for the decline in anthracite was the decline in its use in iron smelting, where it was displaced by coke in blast furnaces after the Civil War. Coke stayed hard and porous and was able to support the heavy column of ore and fuel in the large blast furnaces it enabled.

Anthracite (or "hard" coal) exploitation began before the War of 1812 spurred by the interest and opportunism of the Wurt brothers of Philadelphia. Burning clean and smokeless, anthracite became the preferred fuel in cities, replacing wood by about 1850, the same pattern seen in Europe. The East became deforested, driving up price of fuel wood. Anthracite from the Northeastern Pennsylvania Coal Region and later from West Virginia was valued for household use because it burns cleanly with little ash. It was also used in the early foundries of Philadelphia, New York, Newark and Allentown. The rich Pennsylvania anthracite fields were close to the big eastern cities, and nearly every major railroad in the Eastern United States such as the Reading Railroad, Lehigh & Erie, Central Railroad of New Jersey, Pennsylvania Railroad and Delaware and Hudson Railroad, extended lines into the anthracite fields. Many railroads began as mining company shortline railroads. By 1840, annual hard coal output had passed the million-short ton mark, and then quadrupled by 1850, and as it grew it pushed railroad construction, mining and steel production in a synergistic symbiosis.

In the mid-century Pittsburgh was the principal market. After 1850, soft coal, which is cheaper but dirtier, came into demand for railway locomotives and stationary steam engines, and was used to make coke for steel after 1870.

=== Political factors ===
According to Sean Adams, Washington viewed the domestic coal trade as crucial to the country's future. Congress implemented policies to encourage its growth, including protecting American colliers from foreign competition through tariffs. State governments also supported the development of coal mining, commissioning geological surveys to identify viable coal seams and marking valuable mineral deposits for entrepreneurs. These interventions led to the rapid development of coal mining in the antebellum period. Domestic production eventually dominated American coal markets and the country becoming a net exporter of coal in the 1870s.

==== State governments ====
State governments, protected by federal laws, supported the growth of coal mining during the antebellum period. Pennsylvania exempted anthracite coal from taxes, promoted its use in the iron industry, and encouraged competition between different transport companies to keep prices low. Many states also commissioned geological surveys to find new coalfields and mineral deposits, with Pennsylvania and Illinois specifically targeting coalfields. State geologists found and surveyed the coalfields, but private firms were responsible for mining and selling the coal. Pennsylvania led the way in coal production, accounting for three-fourths of U.S. production by 1850.

==== Late 19th century ====
In the late 19th century, railroad companies became increasingly powerful and played a significant role in the energy policy, particularly in the anthracite coal industry. The railroads purchased coal lands and set prices to maintain their power, while attempts by state and federal authorities to regulate the industry were largely ineffective. The focus of policy makers was on maintaining high production levels and bringing new coalfields into production, as evidenced by the creation of the United States Geological Survey in 1879 to catalog valuable mineral resources.

==== Labor issues ====
By the late 19th century, the relationship between labor and capital in energy production, particularly in coal mining, became a concern for policy makers. Prior to the Civil War, coal mining was done on a small scale, and skilled miners acted as independent contractors. However, the corporate reorganization of coalfields led to pressure on firms to increase production and cut costs. This resulted in mine operators seeking to use the autonomy of miners for their own benefit, such as pressing tonnage rates down, docking miners for sending up coal with too many impurities, and paying miners in scrip rather than cash. Small-scale unions formed in individual coalfields and struck for higher wages, but colliers insisted on the ability to control wages and fought to keep unions from organizing in American coalfields. In 1890, a national trade union, the United Mine Workers of America (UMWA), was established, and for the next half century, the UMWA struggled to win collective bargaining rights in the nation’s coal mines.

=== Early 20th century ===
During the early twentieth century, federal authorities became involved in regulating the coal trade due to labor disputes and attempts by railroad operators to manipulate prices. Railroads in the early 20th century, such as the New York Central Railroad, often operated captive mining companies like the Clearfield Bituminous Coal Corporation to secure steady coal supplies essential for steam locomotive operation. The great Coal strike of 1902 in the anthracite fields threatened to cut off fuel for millions of homes and businesses. This led to President Theodore Roosevelt's intervention and his declaration of a "square deal" between labor and management. While this did not mandate collective bargaining rights, it did offer some governmental oversight. The Justice Department filed a lawsuit against anthracite railroads in 1908, and the United States Bureau of Mines was created in 1910 to enforce safety regulations. Federal intervention aimed to maintain high levels of coal production while providing some protection for workers.

Strikes were very common, the rhetoric employed about exploitation was effective in mobilizing strikers. Detailed analysis of historical data by Price Fishback shows that mining wages were as high, if not higher, than those in manufacturing industry; that the prices in company stores were rarely higher than those in independent stores; and that miners who were dissatisfied with working conditions in a particular mining camp could either "vote with their feet" by migrating elsewhere or use the "voice" of collective union action to resist the threatened abuse.

Total coal output soared until 1918; before 1890, it doubled every ten years, going from 8.4 million short tons in 1850 to 40 million in 1870, 270 million in 1900, and peaking at 680 million short tons in 1918. New soft coal fields opened in Ohio, Indiana and Illinois, as well as West Virginia, Kentucky and Alabama. The Great Depression of the 1930s lowered the demand to 360 million short tons in 1932.

=== Early 21st century ===
By 2014, coal mining had largely shifted to open-pit mines in Wyoming, and there were only 60,000 active coal miners. The UMW had only 35,000 members, of whom 20,000 were working miners, chiefly in the remaining underground mines in Kentucky and West Virginia. By contrast, it had 800,000 members in the late 1930s. However, it remains responsible for pensions and medical benefits for 40,000 retired miners, and for 50,000 spouses and dependents.

The New York Times in 2015 reports how the American coal industry has been struggling due to new environmental regulations, attacks by activists, collapsing coal prices and the rise of cheap alternative fuels. The presidency of Barack Obama introduced rules from the Environmental Protection Agency that limit power plant carbon emissions which will accelerate a shift from coal to natural gas and other alternatives. Several major coal companies have filed for bankruptcy protection, indicating that the future of other large coal companies may be uncertain.

== Mining history by state ==
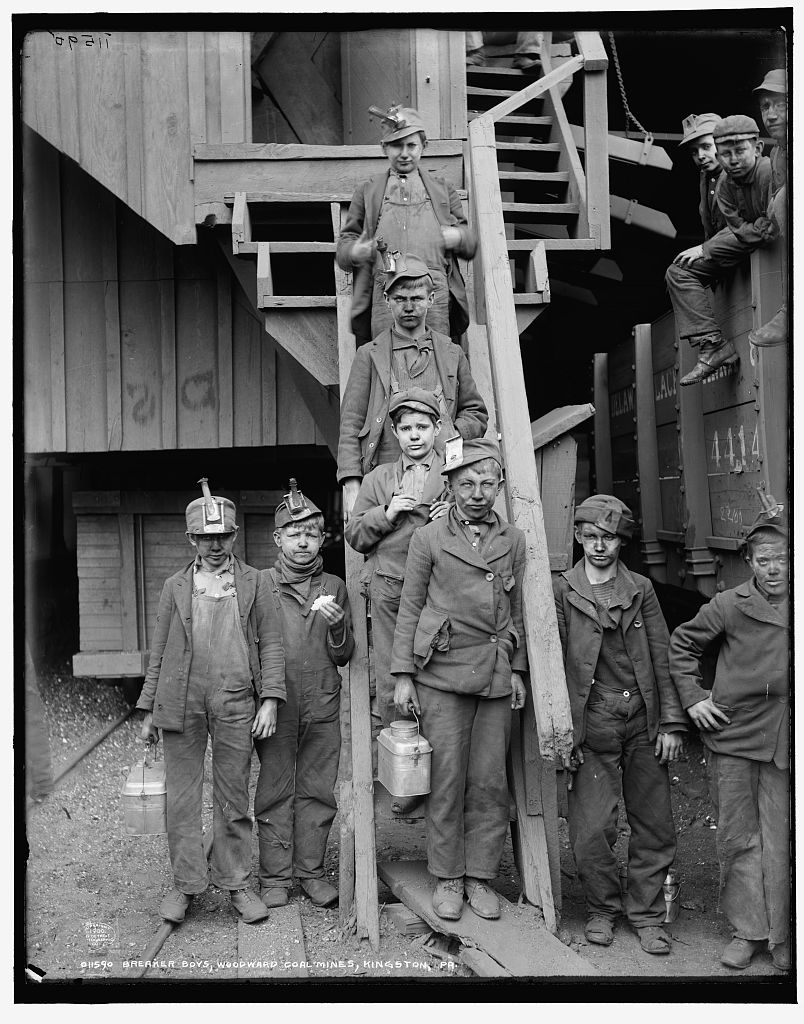
Breaker boys, Woodward Coal Mines, Kingston, Pennsylvania., ca. 1900

=== Pennsylvania ===
- The first anthracite coal was mined in 1768 by Obadiah Gore, in the Wyoming Valley (Kingston, PA). The Susquehanna Company was an expedition that came into the Wyoming Valley from Connecticut and established the first 5 towns: Pittston, Plymouth, Wilkes-Barre, Nanticoke (later Hanover), and Forty Fort (later Kingston).
- Nicholas Scull, a surveyor, issued a map in Philadelphia in 1770 that showed the location of 5 coal mines all in Schuylkill County: York Farm (Pottsville), near Silverton Junction, near Llewellyn, and 2 more around Ashland.
- By 1807, fifty tons of coal was being sold by the Smith Brothers out of Plymouth, Pennsylvania. They exported it via barge on the Susquehanna River to Columbia, PA (Lancaster County).
- In February 1808, Wilkes-Barre resident, Jesse Fell, experimented with a successful open-air grate that kept anthracite burning in low-yield household fires. The Smiths seized on Fell's discovery and returned to Columbia with more coal and instructions for local blacksmiths on preparing the grates.
- Bituminous coal was first mined in Pennsylvania at "Coal Hill" (Mount Washington), just across the Monongahela River from the city of Pittsburgh. The coal was extracted from drift mines in the Pittsburgh coal seam, which outcrops along the hillside and transported by canoe to the nearby military garrison. By 1830, the city of Pittsburgh consumed more than 400 tons per day of bituminous coal for domestic and light industrial use.

The Lackawanna Valley in Pennsylvania was rich in anthracite coal and iron deposits. Brothers George W. Scranton and Seldon T. Scranton moved to the valley in 1840 and settled in the five-house town of Slocum's Hollow (now Scranton) to establish an iron forge. The Scrantons succeeded by using a technological innovation in iron smelting, the "hot blast", developed in Scotland in 1828. The Scrantons also used anthracite coal to make steel, rather than existing methods which used charcoal or bituminous coal.

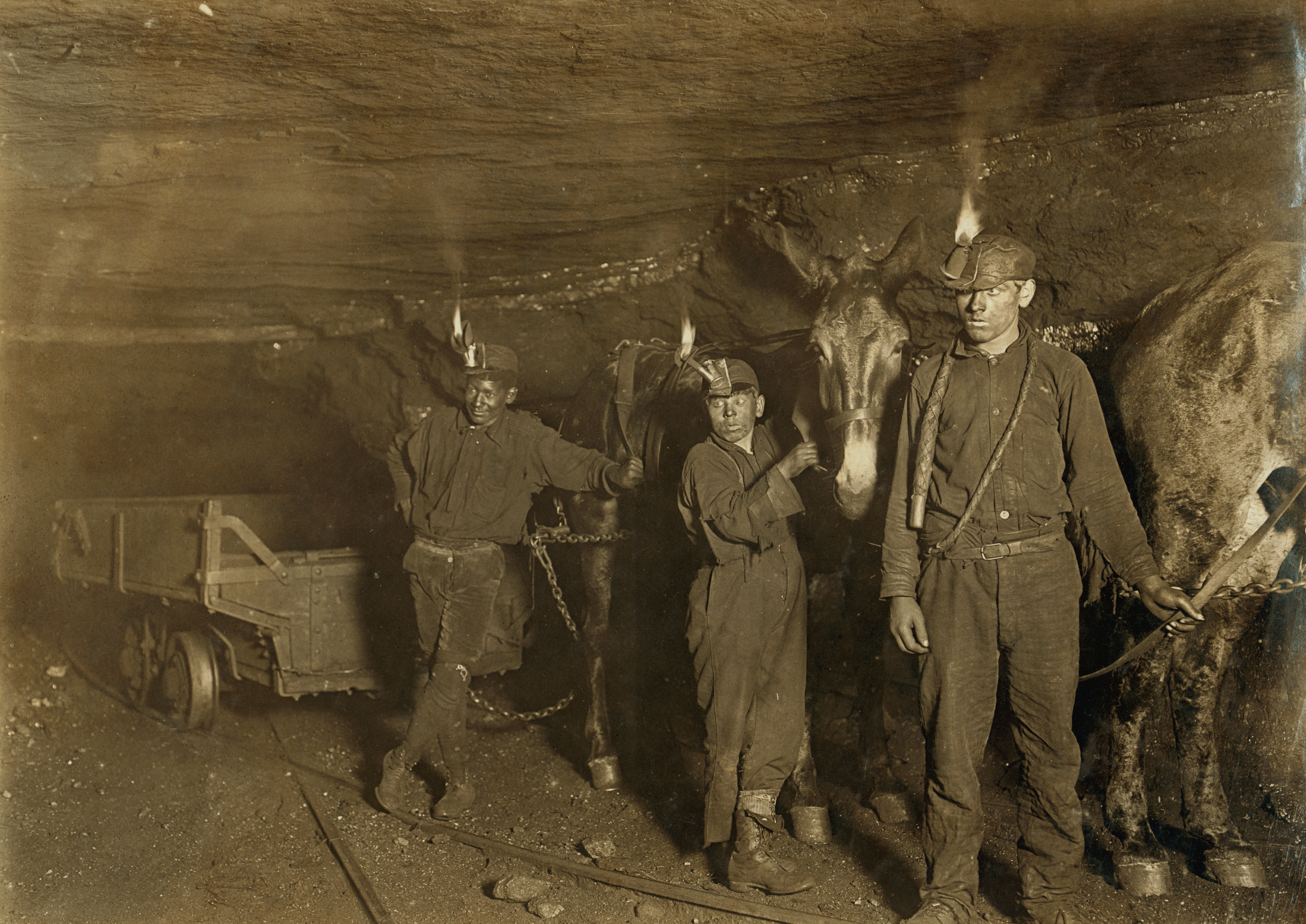
Photo of coal miners in West Virginia, 1908

=== West Virginia ===
In the 1880s, thousands of European immigrants and a large number of African Americans migrated to southern West Virginia to work in coal mines. These coal miners worked in company mines with company tools and equipment, which they were required to lease. Along with these expenses, the miners were deducted pay for housing rent and items they purchased from company stores. Many coal companies paid miners with company scrip (private money), good only at company-owned stores.

==== Accidents in coal mines ====
Safety in the mines was a great concern. West Virginia fell behind other states in regulating mining conditions, and between 1890 and 1912, had a higher mine death rate than any other state. West Virginia was the site of the worst coal mining disaster to date, the Monongah Mining disaster of Monongah, West Virginia in 1907. The disaster was caused by the ignition of methane gas (also called "firedamp"), which in turn ignited the coal dust, killing 362 men. The disaster impelled the United States Congress to create the Bureau of Mines.

Rakes (2008) examines coal mine fatalities in the state in the first half of the 20th century before safety regulations were strictly enforced in the 1960s. Besides the well-publicized mine disasters that killed a number of miners at a time, there were many smaller episodes in which one or two miners lost their lives. Mine accidents were considered inevitable, and mine safety did not appreciably improve the situation because of lax enforcement. West Virginia's mines were considered so unsafe that immigration officials would not recommend them as a source of employment for immigrants, and those unskilled immigrants who did work in the coal mines were more susceptible to death or injury. When the United States Bureau of Mines was given more authority to regulate mine safety in the 1960s, safety awareness improved, and West Virginia coal mines became less dangerous.

=== Kentucky ===
During the early 20th century, the coal mining industry in eastern Kentucky experienced a period of rapid growth. The demand for coal increased as industrialization spread throughout the United States, and many large companies began to invest in mining operations in the region. The introduction of new technologies, such as mechanized equipment and explosives, made mining faster and more efficient. However, it also made the job even more dangerous. Coal mining disasters, such as the Harlan County mining disaster of 1976, were not uncommon and resulted in numerous fatalities. Throughout the 20th century, coal mining remained a major industry in eastern Kentucky, providing jobs and economic growth to the region. However, the industry also had a negative impact on the environment and the health of local residents. Strip mining and mountaintop removal techniques led to widespread deforestation and the destruction of natural habitats, while pollution from coal-fired power plants contributed to high rates of respiratory illness.

In the 21st century, the coal mining in eastern Kentucky has declined due to a variety of factors, including competition from Wyoming, electricity plants switching to natural gas, the rise of renewable energy sources, and a decline in overall demand for coal. As a result, many mining communities in the region have struggled economically, and efforts are underway to diversify the local economy and support alternative industries.

Diana Baldwin and Anita Cherry, hired as miners in 1973, were the first women to work in an underground coal mine in the United States. They were the first female members of United Mine Workers of America to work inside a mine. Cherry and Baldwin were hired by the Beth-Elkhorn Coal Company in Jenkins, Kentucky.

=== Wyoming ===
Coal has been mined in Wyoming since the first mine was opened in 1868 near Fort Bridger. By the early 1890s Wyoming was producing over one million tons annually. Since then, the coal industry has grown to become the state's most important industry. Wyoming currently produces over 40% of the nation's coal, and is second only to West Virginia in terms of coal production. The majority of Wyoming's coal is mined in the Powder River Basin, which is located in the northeastern corner of the state. Wyoming is home to two of the largest coal mines in the United States, the Black Thunder Mine and the North Antelope Rochelle Mine, both located in the Powder River Basin. Wyoming produced 239 million short tons (MST) of coal in 2021, a 9 percent increase from 2020. However, coal production has been on an overall decline since the late 2000s due to factors such as retirement of coal-fired power plants, low natural gas prices and increasing competition from renewables.

=== Indiana ===
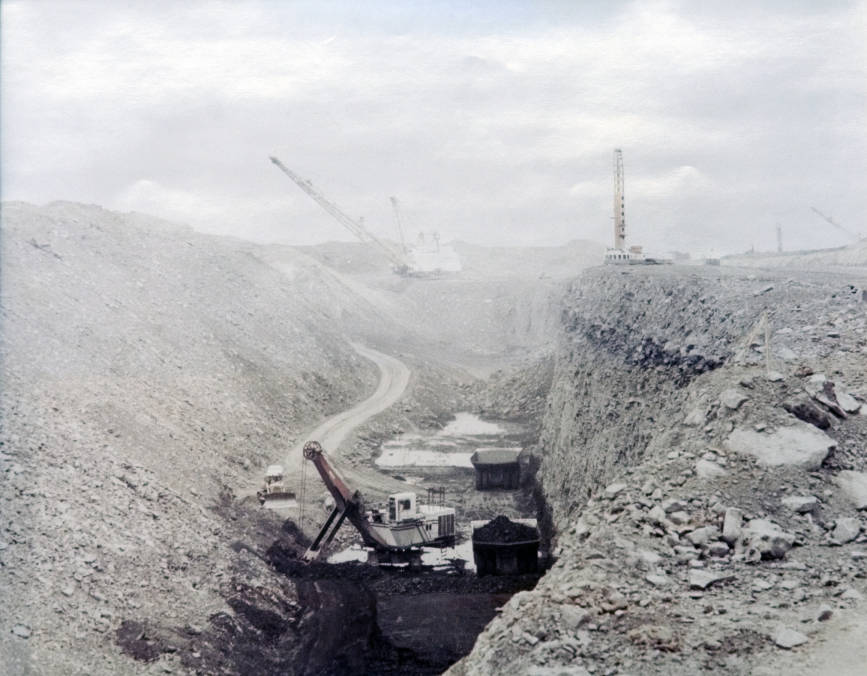
An image of strip mining in Petersburg, IN by the Old Ben Coal Company.

Coal was first found in Indiana in 1736 on the Wabash River. The coal gained was mainly used for fueling steamboats on the Ohio River and by the general public and blacksmiths for fire and heating. After this, railroad production began in the 1850s, where more coal was needed for trains. Underground coal mining began in 1869, peaking in 1918, with surface coal mining beginning development in 1915. By 1950, coal production was valued at over 100 million dollars. Coal mining became more cost-efficient after World War II, starting in 1941. Clay, Owen, Sullivan, and Vigo Counties in Indiana had the most coal mining and expansive coal-heavy areas. Surface mining became the more popular method, being 88% of mining in the late 20th century. Indiana was the 10th highest state in terms of coal production in the United States by 1994.

== Employment ==
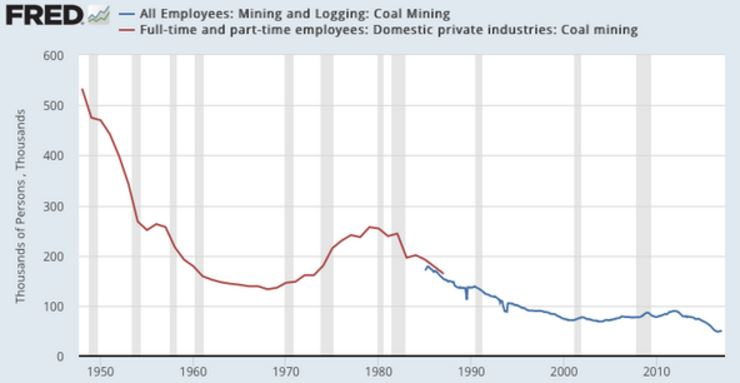
Coal mining employment in the US, 1950-2017

Coal-mining employment increased rapidly in the late 1800s and early 1900s, and peaked in 1923 at 798,000. Since then, the number of miners has fallen considerably since, due to mechanization. By 2019 it had fallen below 55,000.

=== Accidents ===
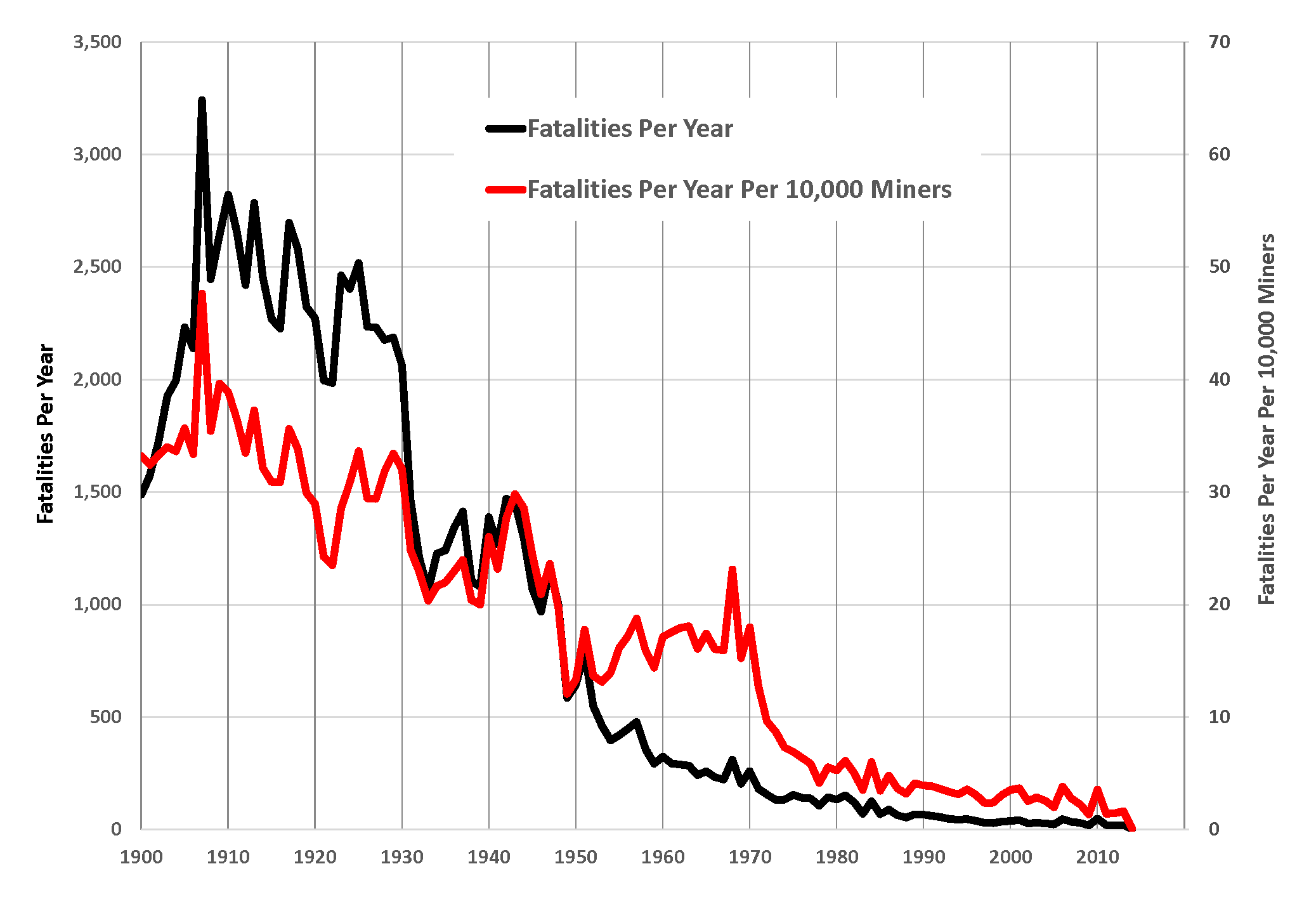
Coal mining fatalities in the United States 1900-2014 (data from US Dept. of Labor)

The rate of coal-mining fatalities has been declining since the early 1900s, both in the raw number of fatalities, and in the fatality rate per miner.

=== United Mine Workers union ===
Coal Producing States, 1889
| State | Coal Production (thousands of short tons) |
|---|---|
| Pennsylvania | 81,719 |
| Illinois | 12,104 |
| Ohio | 9,977 |
| West Virginia | 6,232 |
| Iowa | 4,095 |
| Alabama | 3,573 |
| Indiana | 2,845 |
| Colorado | 2,544 |
| Kentucky | 2,400 |
| Kansas | 2,221 |
| Tennessee | 1,926 |

Since it was founded in 1890, the United Mine Workers (UMW) labor union has played a key role in United States coal mining.

Some notable labor strikes and events include:

- Bituminous Coal Miners' Strike of 1894
- Lattimer Massacre, 1897
- Battle of Virden, 1898
- Coal Strike of 1902
- Ludlow massacre, 1914
- Herrin Massacre, 1921

Under John L. Lewis, the United Mine Workers became the dominant force in the coal fields in the 1930s and 1940s, producing high wages and benefits.

== Mechanization ==
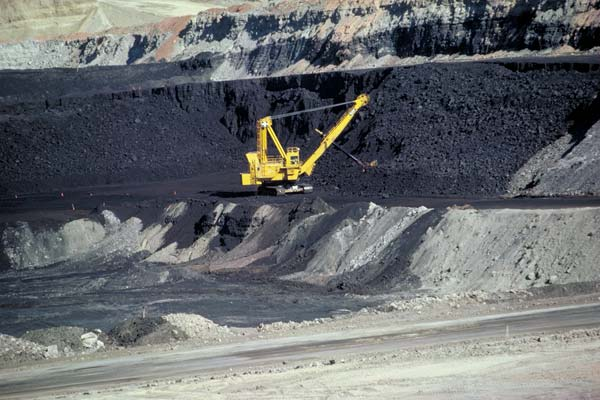
Surface coal mining in Wyoming

Irish mining engineer Richard Sutcliffe invented the first conveyor belt for use in the coal mines of Yorkshire in the early 1900s. Within the first forty years of the 20th century, more than sixty percent of US coal was loaded mechanically rather than by man power. The history of the industry is the history of increasing mechanization. As mechanization continued, fewer miners were needed, and some miners reacted with violence. One of the first machines to arrive at West Virginia's Kanawha field had to be escorted by armed guards. The same machine introduced at a mine in Illinois was operated at a slow speed because the superintendent feared labor troubles.

Despite resistance, mechanization replaced more and more laborers. By 1940, over 2/3 of coal loaded in the large West Virginia fields was done by machine. With the increase of mechanization came much higher wages for those still employed, but hard times for the former miners because there were very few other jobs in or near the camps. Most moved to the cities to find work, or back to the hills where they started.

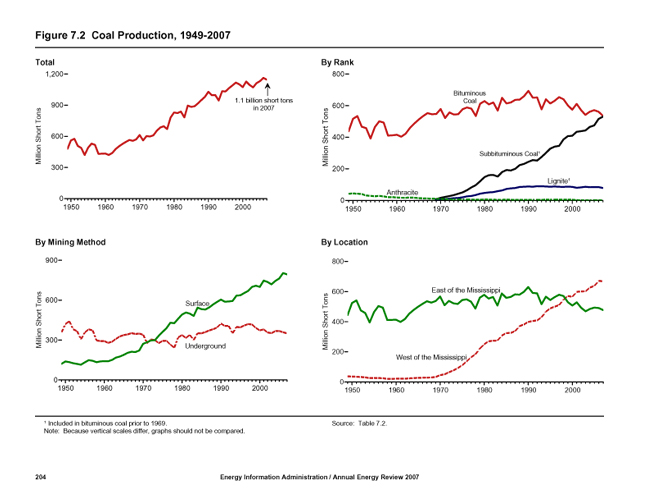
US Coal production from 1949 to 2007(US Energy Information Administration)

In 1914 at the peak there were 180,000 anthracite miners; by 1970 only 6,000 remained. At the same time steam engines were phased out in railways and factories, and bituminous coal was used primarily for the generation of electricity. Employment in bituminous peaked at 705,000 men in 1923, falling to 140,000 by 1970 and 70,000 in 2003.

During World War II, the Solid Fuels Administration for War operated government-seized coal mines, either directly or through cooperation with successive Coal Mines Administrations.

In the 1960s a series of mergers saw coal production shift from small, independent coal companies to large, more diversified firms. Several oil companies and electricity producers acquired coal companies or leased Federal coal reserves in the west of the United States. Concerns that competition in the coal industry could decline as a result of these changes were heightened by a sharp rise in coal prices in the wake of the 1973 oil crisis. Coal prices fell in the 1980s, partly in response to oil price decline, but primarily in response to the large increase in supply worldwide which was brought about by the earlier price surge. During this period, the industry in the U.S. moved to low-sulfur coal.

In 1987 Wyoming became the largest coal producing state. As of 2014, all but one out of the 18 coal mines in Wyoming were strip mines. Wyoming's coal reserves total about 69.3 billion tons, or 14.2% of the U.S. coal reserve.

Coal is used primarily to generate electricity, but the rapid drop in natural gas prices after 2010 created severe competition.

== See also ==
- Coal mining in Colorado
- Coal mining in the United States
- Coal Region of Pennsylvania
- Harrisburg Coal Field of Illinois
- History of coal mining

== Bibliography ==
=== Industry ===
- Adams, Sean Patrick. "The US Coal Industry in the Nineteenth Century." EH.Net Encyclopedia (August 15, 2001), short scholarly overview online
- Adams, Sean Patrick. Old Dominion, Industrial Commonwealth: Coal, Politics, and Economy in Antebellum America. Johns Hopkins University Press, 2004.
- Carley, Sanya, Tom P. Evans, and David M. Konisky. "Adaptation, culture, and the energy transition in American coal country." Energy Research & Social Science 37 (2018): 133-139. online
- Chandler, Alfred. "Anthracite Coal and the Beginnings of the ‘Industrial Revolution' in the United States", Business History Review 46 (1972): 141–181. in JSTOR
- DiCiccio, Carmen.Coal and Coke in Pennsylvania. Harrisburg: Pennsylvania Historical and Museum Commission, 1996
- Conley, Phil. History of West Virginia Coal Industry (Charleston: Education Foundation, 1960)
- Eavenson, Howard. The First Century and a Quarter of the American Coal Industry (1942).
- Gardner, A. Dudley. Forgotten frontier: A history of Wyoming coal mining (Routledge, 1989, reprinted 2019) online
- Green, Homer. Coal and the coal mines (1917), an overview by an expert. online
- Lauver, Fred J. "A Walk Through the Rise and Fall of Anthracite Might", Pennsylvania Heritage Magazine 27#1 (2001) online edition
- Long, Priscilla. Where the Sun Never Shines: A History of America's Bloody Coal Industry. Paragon, 1989.
- Nelson, Robert H. The Making of Federal Coal Policy (1983)
- Parker, Glen Lawhon. The Coal Industry: A Study in Social Control (1940) online
- Powell, H. Benjamin. Philadelphia's First Fuel Crisis. Jacob Cist and the Developing Market for Pennsylvania Anthracite. The Pennsylvania State University Press, 1978.
- Rottenberg, Dan. In the Kingdom of Coal: An American Family and the Rock That Changed the World (2003), owners' perspective
- Schurr, Sam H., and Bruce C. Netschert. Energy in the American Economy, 1850-1975: An Economic Study of Its History and Prospects. (1960).
- Stewart, James. "King Coal, long besieged, is deposed by the market." New York Times (Aug. 6, 2015) online.
- Vietor, Richard H. K. and Martin V. Melosi; Environmental Politics and the Coal Coalition
- Warren, Kenneth. Triumphant Capitalism: Henry Clay Frick and the Industrial Transformation of America. (1996).
- Watson, Brett, et al. "Coal demand, market forces, and US coal mine closures." Economic Inquiry 61.1 (2023): 35-57.

=== Miners and unions ===
- Arnold, Andrew B. Fueling the Gilded Age: Railroads, Miners, and Disorder in Pennsylvania Coal Country (2014)
- Aurand, Harold W. Coalcracker Culture: Work and Values in Pennsylvania Anthracite, 1835–1935 (2003).
- Baratz, Morton S. The Union and the Coal Industry (Yale University Press, 1955)
- Bell, Shannon Elizabeth, and Richard York. "Community economic identity: The coal industry and ideology construction in West Virginia." Rural Sociology 75.1 (2010): 111-143. online
- Blatz, Perry. Democratic Miners: Work and Labor Relations in the Anthracite Coal Industry, 1875-1925. (1994).
- Corbin, David Alan.Life, Work, and Rebellion in the Coal Fields: The Southern West Virginia Miners, 1880-1922 (1981; 2nd edition 2015) online
- Coal Mines Administration, U.S. Department Of The Interior. A Medical Survey of the Bituminous-Coal Industry. (U.S. Government Printing Office. 1947)
- Coleman, McAlister. Men and coal (1943) a wide-ranging popular history. online
- Dix, Keith. What's a Coal Miner to Do? The Mechanization of Coal Mining (1988), changes in the coal industry prior to 1940
- Dubofsky, Melvyn and Warren Van Tine, John L. Lewis: A Biography (1977), leader of Mine Workers union, 1920–1960
- Eller, Ronald D. Miners, Millhands, and Mountaineers: Industrialization of the Appalachian South, 1880–1930 (1982)
- Fishback, Price V. Soft Coal, Hard Choices: The Economic Welfare of Bituminous Coal Miners, 1890–1930 (1992)
- Fox, Mayor. United We Stand: The United Mine Workers of America 1890-1990 (UMW 1990), detailed semiofficial union history.
- Grossman, Jonathan. "The Coal Strike of 1902 – Turning Point in U.S. Policy" Monthly Labor Review October 1975. online
- Harvey, Katherine. The Best Dressed Miners: Life and Labor in the Maryland Coal Region, 1835-1910. Cornell University Press, 1993.
- Hinrichs; A. F. The United Mine Workers of America, and the Non-Union Coal Fields (Columbia University, 1923
- Lantz; Herman R. People of Coal Town (Columbia University Press, 1958; on southern Illinois.
- Laslett, John H.M. ed. The United Mine Workers: A Model of Industrial Solidarity? Penn State University Press, 1996.
- Laslett, John H.M. "The Independent Collier: Some Recent Studies of Nineteenth Century Coalmining Communities in Britain and the United States." International Labor and Working-Class History 21 (1982): 18–27. online
- Lewis, Ronald L. Black Coal Miners in America: Race, Class, and Community Conflict. University Press of Kentucky, 1987.
- Lewis, Ronald L. Welsh Americans: A History of Assimilation in the Coalfields (UNC press, 2015)
- Lunt, Richard D. Law and Order vs. the Miners: West Virginia, 1907-1933 Archon Books, 1979, On labor conflicts of the early twentieth century.
- Lynch, Edward A. and David J. McDonald.Coal and Unionism: A History of the American Coal Miners' Unions (1939)
- McIntosh, Robert. Boys in the pits: Child labour in coal mines (McGill-Queen's Press-MQUP, 2000), Canadian mines
- Palladino, Grace. Another Civil War : labor, capital, and the state in the anthracite regions of Pennsylvania, 1840-68 (1990) online
- Phelan, Craig. Divided Loyalties: The Public and Private Life of Labor Leader John Mitchell (1994)
- Rössel, Jörg. Industrial Structure, Union Strategy and Strike Activity in Bituminous Coal Mining, 1881 - 1894 Social Science History 26 (2002): 1 - 32.
- Roy, Andrew. A history of the coal miners of the United States, from the development of the mines to the close of the anthracite strike of 1902, including a brief sketch of early British miners (1907) online
- Seltzer, Curtis. Fire in the Hole: Miners and Managers in the American Coal Industry University Press of Kentucky, 1985, conflict in the coal industry to the 1980s. online
- Trotter Jr., Joe William. Coal, Class, and Color: Blacks in Southern West Virginia, 1915-32 (1990)
- U.S. Immigration Commission, Report on Immigrants in Industries, Part I: Bituminous Coal Mining, 2 vols. Senate Document no. 633, 61st Cong., 2nd sess. (1911)
- United States Anthracite Coal Strike Commission, 1902–1903, Report to the President on the Anthracite Coal Strike of May–October, 1902 By United States Anthracite Coal Strike (1903) online edition
- Wallace, Anthony F.C. St. Clair. A Nineteenth-Century Coal Town's Experience with a Disaster-Prone Industry. (1981)
- Ward, Robert D., and William W. Rogers, Labor Revolt in Alabama: The Great Strike of 1894 (1965)
