= Uglegorsk =

Uglegorsk (Russian: Углегорск) is the name of several inhabited localities in Russia.

Urban localities

- Uglegorsk, Sakhalin Oblast, a town in Uglegorsky District of Sakhalin Oblast; administratively incorporated as a town of district significance

Rural localities

- Tsiolkovsky, Amur Oblast, a settlement in Amur Oblast; administratively incorporated as an urban okrug of the same name, which until 2015 was known as Uglegorsk.

== See also ==
- Vuhlehirsk, a city in Ukraine called Uglegorsk in Russian language
