= East Mining Company =

Russian coal company

East Mining Company (EMCO)
- Native name: Восточная горнорудная компания (ВГК)
- Type: LLC
- Founded: 26 December 2011; 14 years ago
- Headquarters: Sakhalin Region, Russia
- Products: coal
- Net income: 21,781,150,000 Russian ruble (2022)
- Number of employees: 3000
- Website: www.eastmining.ru/en/

East Mining Company (EMCO; Russian Vostochnaya Mining Company, VGK) is the coal mining enterprise in Sakhalin Region. At the end of 2016, the company was ranked 26th among the largest coal mining companies in Russia.

Solntsevsky Coal Mine LLC consists of surface mines Yuzhnuy-1 and Yuzhnuy-2 located in the Uglegorsk district of Sakhalin Region. The proven coal reserves are estimated to be up to 300 million tons.

The structure of East Mining Company includes mining and logistics assets. It is engaged in the extraction and shipment of brown and black coals of 3B and D grade as well as anthracites, natural thermoanthracites.

== History ==
The history of the Eastern Mining Company dates back to the discovery of the Solntsevo brown coal deposit in the 1980s, the development of which began in 1987. The total resources of the field exceed 3 billion tons, the proven reserves amount to about 800 million tons, including about 500 million tons for open-pit mining.

After the development of the field began, from 1987 to 2003, there were 4.4 million tons of coal in the field. In 2011, the owners decided to upgrade the production and create an enterprise.

In 2011, for the first time in the history of Sakhalin Region, the BelAZ-75131 dump trucks with a payload capacity of 130 tons were put into operation at the Solntsevsky Coal Mine. In 2012, Solntsevsky Coal Mine LLC purchased new Liebherr 9250 excavators with a bucket capacity of 15 m3 and began to operate them. At the end of 2013, Komatsu PC2000 and PC1250 excavators, HD 785 dump trucks, D375A-5 and WD 600-3 mining bulldozers, WA 470-3 loaders with a 6.2 m3 bucket also have been put into operation at the Solntsevsky Coal Mine.

In 2013, the company employed about 800 people. At the same time, a project was launched to increase coal production at the Solntsevsky coal field, and later construction of a main conveyor from the Solntsevsky field to the coal port of Shakhtersk was started.

It reduced the load on the road network of the Uglegorsk region and increase Sakhalin coal exports to the countries of the Asia-Pacific region.

== Production ==
In December 2016, in Tokyo, East Mining Company entered into a cooperation agreement with Sojitz Corporation. In September 2017, the company began to cooperate with Marubeni Corporation. Due to the modernization of production facilities, East Mining Company plans to increase coal production.

In 2016, sixteen BelAZ-75306 dump trucks with a carrying capacity of 220 tons and three Komatsu and Hitachi excavators with a bucket capacity of 23 m3 were received and put into operation. In 2016, the production volumes amounted to 4 million tons, and shipment volume reached 3.1 million tons. East Mining Company supplies the entire Sakhalin Region with coal.

In 2017, the company planned to export 4.5 million tons of coal, which is almost 45.2% more than in 2016.

In 2018, around 2 billion rubles were invested in the development of EMCO's main facilities. The mine received 8 new powerful excavators, 34 heavy-duty mining trucks, 8 bulldozers, loaders, and graders, which significantly increased coal production.

In 2019, the company's mining equipment fleet exceeded 150 units. In the same year, the first EKG-20 mining excavator, manufactured by Uralmashzavod, was delivered to Sakhalin. In 2019, the company's workforce numbered around 3,000 employees.

In 2019, to reduce costs and lower harmful emissions, East Mining Company purchased equipment and began constructing the longest main conveyor in Russia, with a total length of 23 km. The conveyor is intended to transport overburden to the coal port.

In 2020, the company began installing the main coal conveyor. From 2020 to 2023, the company carried out construction and commissioning works.

In 2021, East Mining Company operated 127 mining trucks at the Solntsevsky coal mine.

In 2021, the installation of the conveyor's high structures commenced. In 2022, the company started installing the conveyor belt. The conveyor is scheduled to be operational in 2024.

== Environmental projects ==
The company is actively engaged in the solution of environmental issues.

East Mining Company implements environmental protection measures in the region. In April 2024, EMCO completed work on the construction of a new channel of the Zheltaya River, modern sewage treatment plants are being created. The total cost of the eco-project amounted to more than 320 million rubles. As part of the implementation of eco-projects in 2024, East Mining Company is planting 180 hectares of forest, and has also released 300 thousand salmon into the Sakhalin rivers. The company's specialists regularly check the water quality in Sakhalin rivers, as well as conduct emergency response exercises.
