= The Ashio Riot of 1907: A Social History of Mining in Japan =

1988 book by Nimura Kazuo

- Author: Nimura Kazuo
- Original title: 足尾暴動の史的分析 : 鉱山労働者の社会
- Translator: Terry Boardman
- Language: Japanese
- Series: Comparative and International Working-Class History
- Subject: Ashio copper mine riot of 1907
- Genre: Non-fiction
- Publisher: University of Tokyo Press
- Publication date: 1988

The Ashio Riot of 1907: A Social History of Mining in Japan (足尾暴動の史的分析 : 鉱山労働者の社会, Ashio Bōdō no Shiteki Bunseki: Kōzanrōdō no Shakai) is a 1988 non-fiction book by Nimura Kazuo (二村 一夫), published by University of Tokyo Press, about the Ashio copper mine riot of 1907. It was originally written in Japanese, with the English translation by Terry Boardman and editing by Andrew Gordon, and published by Duke University Press in January 1998 in an abridged form; this was the first time that any of Nimura's works had an English version.

In addition to the riot itself, the book explores the state of Japan when its industry was developing. F. G. Notehelfer of the University of California, Los Angeles described it as "a highly textured examination of the emergence of an industrial labor force in Meiji Japan." Michael Lewis of Michigan State University stated that the book mainly existed to challenge earlier narratives about the Ashio riots.

== Background ==
Much of the content originated from essays written by Mimura from 1959 to the early 1970s. Lewis stated that they were "not significantly revised them for this English translation."

Nimura's employer is Hosei University. Stephen S. Large described Nimura as "a respected authority on Japanese labor history."

== Contents ==
Andrew Gordon wrote the introduction of the English version parallel to Nimura's own introduction and states that Nimura's book is based on his own academic processes separate from those in western institutions. According to Sally A. Hastings of Purdue University, Gordon's introduction "elegantly frame[s]" Nimura's.

The background leading up to the event is described in the book's original introduction. According to Large, the introduction reveals that the work is "a broad examination of the social relations of mining production" and not only about a conflict between workers and the owners of capital.

Nimura criticized the arguments of three previous authors writing about the event, Masao Maruyama, Ōkōchi Kazuo, and Yamada Moritarō. Maruyama's argument was that the Japanese laborers lacked self-agency and Ōkōchi's argument was that Japanese labor forces had a static character. Yamada had made arguments based on Marxism as practiced in Japan. The first two figures had arguments dating from the 1950s to the 1960s.

The epilogue has a comparison of this incident with organized labor incidents in the Western world.

The book does not have a bibliography. Titles of Japanese works are, in the English translation, rendered in English.

== Reception ==
Hastings overall praised the book and argued that her criticisms reflected "minor flaws"; she criticized the English version for not having a bibliography, which would state Japanese titles in Japanese, as this made it more difficult to identify the original language of a source.

Lewis agreed with Nimura's views, and stated that they had been already done by previous authors, stating that it "ends up beating horses about which few historians any longer bother". Citing the depiction of the lives of the striking workers, Lewis stated that the book has "value as a case study". Lewis compared the book to Office Ladies and Salaried Men: Power, Gender, and Work in Japanese Companies by Yuko Ogasawara, stating that the works are more similar than one might initially believe, and that The Ashio Riot of 1907 is the more "self-consciously revisionist" of the two.

Notehelfer praised the translation and the process of abridging the original work.

Irwin Scheiner of the University of California, Berkeley described the book as "an elegant work of historical research and craft". Scheiner did state that he felt the lack of input in regards to "social process or historical change" was "the one important failing".

William T. Tsutsui of the University of Kansas wrote that "this book stands as a major work of labor history, a model of painstaking research and keen historical analysis that deserves a wide audience".
