= Priscilla Long =

American writer and political activist

- Born: 1943
- Occupation: Writer
- Known for: Where the Sun Never Shines: A History of America's Bloody Coal Industry

Priscilla Long (born 1943) is an American writer, poet, and political activist. She co-founded a Boston consciousness raising group that contributed to Bread and Roses. A longtime anti-war activist, Long was arrested in the 1963 Gwynn Oak Park sit-in.

== Works ==
- The New Left: A Collection of Essays, as editor (1969, Porter Sargent)
- Where the Sun Never Shines: A History of America's Bloody Coal Industry (1989, Paragon House)
- "We Called Ourselves Sisters" in The Feminist Memoir Project (1998, Three Rivers Press)
- Fire and Stone: Where Do We Come From? Where Are We Going? (2016, University of Georgia Press)
- Minding the Muse: A Handbook for Painters, Composers, Writers, and Other Creators (2016, Coffeetown Press)
- Holy Magic (2020, MoonBath Press)
- Dancing with the Muse in Old Age (2022, Epicenter Press)
