= Where the Sun Never Shines =

1989 book by Priscilla Long

- Author: Priscilla Long
- Subject: American history
- Publisher: Paragon House
- Publication date: 1989
- Pages: 420

Where the Sun Never Shines: A History of America's Bloody Coal Industry is a 1989 history book by Priscilla Long. The text covers the Coal Wars, in particular the 1913–14 Colorado Coalfield War and Ludlow Massacre.

== Bibliography ==
- Athey, Lou (1992). "Review of Where The Sun Never Shines: A History of America's Bloody Coal Industry; United We Stand: The United Mine Workers of America, 1890-1990". Pennsylvania History: A Journal of Mid-Atlantic Studies. 59 (1): 74–78. ISSN 0031-4528. JSTOR 27773508.
- Aurand, Harold W. (1991). "Review of Where the Sun Never Shines: A History of America's Bloody Coal Industry". The Journal of American History. 78 (1): 363–364. doi:10.2307/2078205. ISSN 0021-8723. JSTOR 2078205.
- Bindocci, Gay (1991). "Review of Where the Sun Never Shines: A History of America's Bloody Coal Industry". Technology and Culture. 32 (3): 610–611. doi:10.2307/3106122. ISSN 0040-165X. JSTOR 3106122.
- Bryans, Bill (1991). "Review of Where the Sun Never Shines: A History of America's Bloody Coal Industry". The Western Historical Quarterly. 22 (2): 208–209. doi:10.2307/969209. ISSN 0043-3810. JSTOR 969209.
- Clark, Paul F. (1991). "Review of Where the Sun Never Shines: A History of America's Bloody Coal Industry". Industrial and Labor Relations Review. 44 (4): 774–775. doi:10.2307/2524478. ISSN 0019-7939. JSTOR 2524478.
- Corbin, David A. (1991). "Review of Where the Sun Never Shines: A History of America's Bloody Coal Industry". The American Historical Review. 96 (2): 620. doi:10.2307/2163428. ISSN 0002-8762. JSTOR 2163428.
- Fishback, Price V. (1991). "Review of Where the Sun Never Shines: A History of America's Bloody Coal Industry". The Journal of Economic History. 51 (4): 991–992. doi:10.1017/S0022050700040420. ISSN 0022-0507. JSTOR 2123424. S2CID 154659545.
- French, Michael (1991). "Review of Where the Sun Never Shines: A History of America's Bloody Coal Industry". History. 76 (248): 448–449. ISSN 0018-2648. JSTOR 24421401.
- Hevener, John W. (1991). "Review of Where the Sun Never Shines: A History of America's Bloody Coal Industry". The Journal of Southern History. 57 (3): 531–532. doi:10.2307/2209973. ISSN 0022-4642. JSTOR 2209973.
- Kent Powell, Allan (April 1991). "Where the Sun Never Shines: a History of America's Bloody Coal Industry". The Annals of Iowa. 50 (8): 936–937. doi:10.17077/0003-4827.9544. ISSN 0003-4827.
- Kingsolver, Barbara (1990). Long, Priscilla (ed.). "Notes from Underground". The Women's Review of Books. 7 (9): 21–22. doi:10.2307/4020770. ISSN 0738-1433. JSTOR 4020770.
- Lewis, Ronald L. (1991). "Review of Where the Sun Never Shines: A History of America's Bloody Coal Industry". The Pennsylvania Magazine of History and Biography. 115 (2): 279–281. ISSN 0031-4587. JSTOR 20092619.
- Nordhauser, Norman (1991). "Review of Where the Sun Never Shines: A History of America's Bloody Coal Industry". Illinois Historical Journal. 84 (1): 61–62. ISSN 0748-8149. JSTOR 40192512.
- Reagan, Patrick D. (1991). "Review of Where the Sun Never Shines: A History of America's Bloody Coal Industry". The Historian. 53 (2): 373–374. ISSN 0018-2370. JSTOR 24447916.
- Scamehorn, Lee (1991). "Review of Where the Sun Never Shines: A History of America's Bloody Coal Industry". Montana: The Magazine of Western History. 41 (1): 89–90. ISSN 0026-9891. JSTOR 4519371.
- Seltzer, Curtis (1991). "Review of Where the Sun Never Shines: A History of America's Bloody Coal Industry". Appalachian Journal. 18 (3): 314–320. ISSN 0090-3779. JSTOR 40933302.
- Smith, Duane A. (1990). "Review of Where the Sun Never Shines: A History of America's Bloody Coal Industry". Pacific Historical Review. 59 (4): 566–567. doi:10.2307/3640249. ISSN 0030-8684. JSTOR 3640249.
- Trotter, Joe W. (1990). "Review of Where the Sun Never Shines: A History of America's Bloody Coal Industry". The Business History Review. 64 (4): 776–778. doi:10.2307/3115513. ISSN 0007-6805. JSTOR 3115513. S2CID 155279221.
- Walsh, Margaret (1990). "Review of Where the Sun Never Shines: A History of America's Bloody Coal Industry". The Economic History Review. 43 (4): 772. doi:10.2307/2596778. ISSN 0013-0117. JSTOR 2596778.
