= Mining lamp =

Lamp for underground mining, head-mounted or otherwise

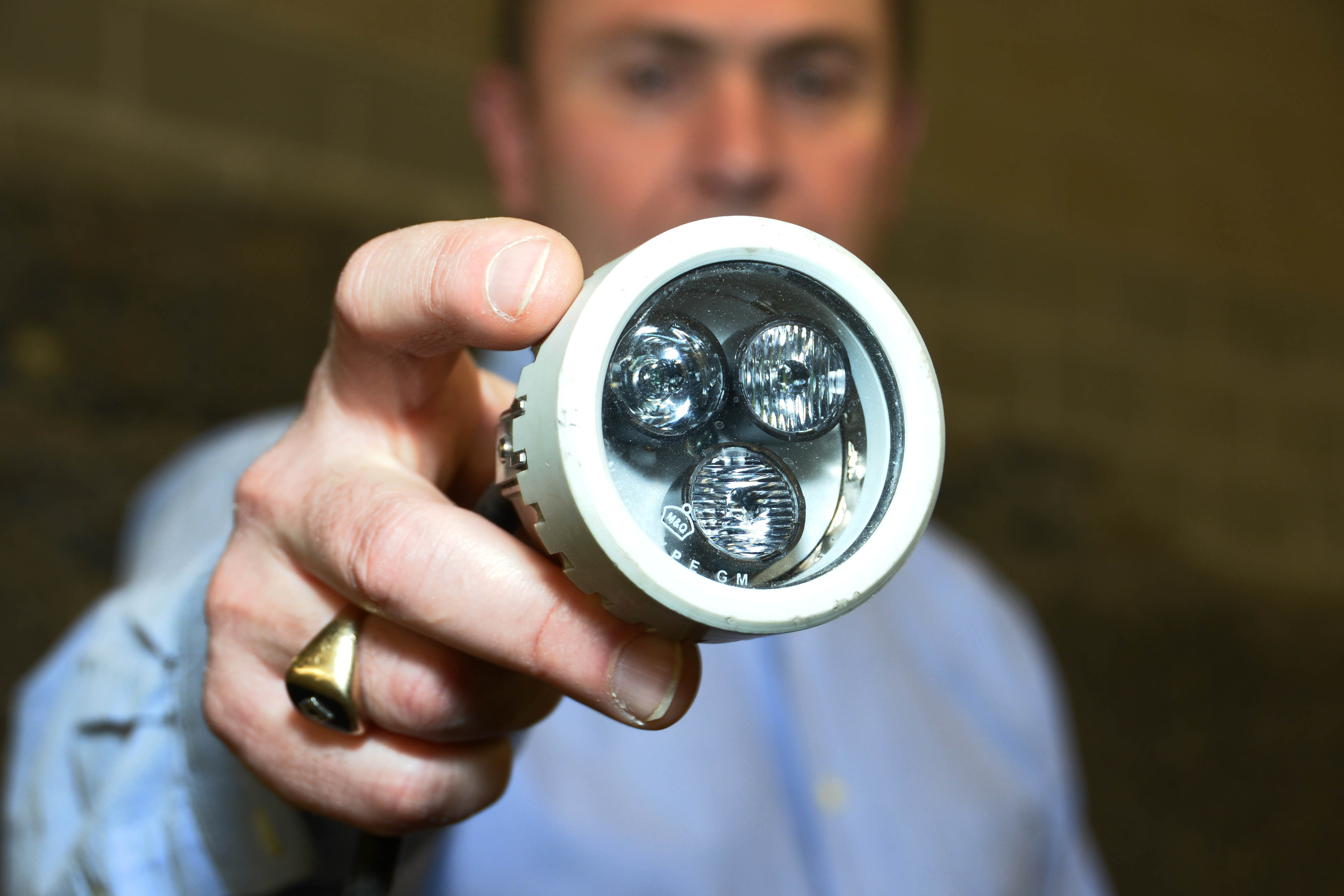
A modern LED mining lamp

A mining lamp is a lamp, developed for the rigid necessities of underground mining operations. Most often it is worn on a hard hat in the form of a headlamp.

== History ==
Types

1813 Dr William Reid Clanny exhibited The Clanny Lamp

1815 Humphry Davy exhibited The Davy Lamp

1815 George Stephenson exhibited his Lamp

The Davy Safety Lamp was made in London by Humphry Davy. George Stephenson invented a similar lamp but Davys invention was safer due to it having a fine wire gauze that surrounded the flame. This enabled the light to pass through and reduced the risk of explosion by stopping the "firedamp" methane gas coming in contact with the flame.

1840 Mathieu Mueseler Exhibited The Museler Lamp in Belgium.

1859 William Clark patented the first electrical mining lamp.

1870s J.B.Marsaut (France) double gauze design

1872 Coal Mines Regulation Act required locked lamps under certain conditions

1881 Joseph Swan exhibited his first electric lamp

1882 Made by William Reid Clanny invented a 'bonnetted' Clanny lamp,

1883 Elliis Lever of Culcheth Hall Bowdon offered a £500 prize for creation of a safe portable mining lamp.

1885 Thomas Evans of Aberdare made a Clanny type of safety lamp

1886 Royal Commission on Accidents in Mines tested lamps and made recommendations

1887 Coal Mines Regulation Act – requirements on construction, examination, where used, etc.

1889 John Davis and Co, Derby, were supplying portable electric lamps

1896 Coal Mines Regulation Act – requirements on provision by mine owners, where to be used, etc.

1909 Cap (helmet) lamps introduced in Scotland

1911 Prize offered for best electrical lamp

1911 Coal Mines Act made requirements for pit managers to take examinations, where can be used (including electrical), etc.

1920 Electrical lamp with built in accumulator

1924 Miners Lamp Committee – tests and recommendations

1950 Shale miner's electric safety cap lamp and battery pack made in England and supplied by Concordia Electric Safety Lamp Company Ltd, Cardiff.

== Variants ==
- Carbide lamp, a lamp that produces and burns acetylene
- Safety lamp, any of several types of lamp which are designed to be safe to use in coal mines
  - Davy lamp, a safety lamp containing a candle
  - Geordie lamp, a safety lamp
  - Wheat lamp

== See also ==
- Headlamp (outdoor)
