= John Hodgson (antiquary) =

English clergyman and antiquary (1779–1845)

- Born: 4 November 1779; Shap, Westmoreland, England
- Died: 12 June 1845 (aged 65); Hartburn, Northumberland, England
- Resting place: Hartburn, Northumberland; 55.169134°N 1.863003°W
- Education: Bampton grammar school, Westmoreland
- Occupations: Schoolteacher, clergyman, writer
- Spouse: Jane Kell (m. 1810)
- Writing career
- Notable works: Poems written at Lanchester (1807), The Picture of Newcastle-on-Tyne (1812), History of Northumberland (1820–1839)

John Hodgson (4 November 1779 – 12 June 1845) was an English clergyman and antiquary, known as the county historian of Northumberland.

== Early life ==
The son of Isaac Hodgson and Elizabeth, daughter of William Rawes, he was born at Swindale, in the parish of Shap, Westmoreland, on 4 November 1779; his father was a stonemason. Hodgson studied at the grammar school of Bampton from the age of seven to nineteen. He learned a good deal of classics, mathematics, chemistry, botany, and geology, and acquired an interest in natural history and local antiquities, through rambles in the countryside.

His parents were too poor to make a university education possible, and at the age of twenty he started work as the master of the village school at Matterdale, near Ullswater. He soon moved to a school at Stainton, near Penrith. Early in 1801 he was appointed to the school of Sedgefield in County Durham, where the endowment was £20. The rector of Sedgefield, George Barrington, was a nephew of Shute Barrington, the Bishop of Durham, and his curates supported Hodgson.

== Clergyman and antiquarian ==
Hodgson was offered an appointment as director of some ironworks near Newcastle, with a salary of £300 a year, but turned it down. In 1802, however, he failed an examination for holy orders. In poor health, he left Sedgefield in 1803, for the mastership of the school at Lanchester, County Durham. There in 1804, he succeeded in passing his examination for ordination, and became curate of the chapelries of Esh and Saltley, hamlets in the parish of Lanchester, where he still kept his school.

In 1806, Hodgson left Lanchester for the curacy of Gateshead; in 1808 he was presented by a private patron, Mr. Ellison, with the living of Jarrow with Heworth. The income barely amounted to £100 a year; it was congenial to Hodgson's tastes to serve the church, which had been founded by Bede. In 1810 he married Jane Bridget, daughter of Richard Kell, a stone merchant, of his parish.

In 1821, Hodgson visited London, and made an expedition to Oxford for the purposes of his researches. He was also busy in raising money for a new church at Heworth, which he designed himself. It replaced an older chapel, was built for Hodgson by John Stokoe, and was consecrated in May 1822. Conservation work in the graveyard gave Hodgson the topic for a paper, a biography of Richard Dawes. A find of a coin hoard, with coins of Ecgfrith of Northumbria, however, turned out to consist of recent fakes when they were analysed in the 1980s, following doubts raised in 1956.

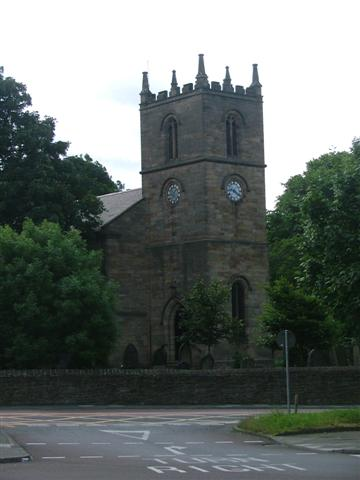
Heworth Church

In 1823, Bishop Barrington presented Hodgson to the vicarage of Kirkwhelpington, a country parish in the centre of Northumberland. His obligation to the new church at Heworth, which had not yet been paid for, made it desirable that he should continue to hold the living of Jarrow until the parish of Heworth had been separated from it. This he continued to do, appointing two curates, till 1833, and had troubles in consequence. At Kirkwhelpington he was near two students of local antiquities, Sir John Edward Swinburne of Capheaton Hall, and Walter Calverley Trevelyan of Wallington, who gave him encouragement.

== Mining safety ==
In May 1812, there was a colliery explosion, now called the Felling mine disaster, at the Felling pit in Hodgson's parish; it caused the death of 92 people. The owners were Brandling, Henderson & Grace. Hodgson wrote about the accident in the Newcastle Courant, against the owners' wishes; he appealed for help for the widows and orphans, and published his funeral sermon, to which he prefixed an account of the accident. This book, An Account of the Explosion at Felling (Newcastle, 1813), has an accurate account of the colliery, accompanied by a plan of the workings, and is one of the few trustworthy records of the old system of coal-mining; parts are reprinted in James Raine's Life of Hodgson. John James Wilkinson, a London barrister with a Durham background, saw Hodgson's pamphlet, and published his own Proposals for the establishment of a Society for the Prevention of Accidents in Coal Mines. Bishop Shute Barrington saw Wilkinson's work, and gave Robert Gray, then at Bishopwearmouth, a free hand in setting up a society. The Society for Preventing Accidents in Coal Mines first met on 1 October 1813, with Hodgson on the committee.

For the next few years Hodgson was employed in making experiments and attending meetings of the Society. Another founder member was William Reid Clanny, a pioneer of the safety lamp. One of the first moves by the Society (commonly called the "Sunderland Society") was agitation for the calling of a coroner's inquest in the cases of mining deaths, something mine owners had resisted; and Sir John Bayley raised the topic at the 1814 Newcastle Assizes. In November, John Buddle, a colliery manager, engineer and viewer, published a report on the ventilation of mines.

In 1815, Hodgson visited the Dudley coal-field, examining some of the means of preventing colliery accidents. These were not satisfactory. Robert Gray asked Sir Humphry Davy for assistance, and Davy visited Newcastle in August, meeting Hodgson and Buddle. Back in London Davy worked with Michael Faraday and identified "firedamp" as methane. The research led to the Davy lamp, and Hodgson's help was acknowledged. Hodgson himself was one of the first to venture into a mine with the new lamp and explain its principle to the colliers.

== The History of Northumberland ==
In 1817, Hodgson began his major work, the History of Northumberland. It became a classic model, in terms of plan and completeness of execution.

In 1819, Hodgson visited London to work in the British Museum, and announced his book to appear in six volumes, published by subscription, limited to three hundred copies. The plan of the work was that the first volume should contain the general history of the county, the next three volumes a detailed account of the towns and villages, and the last two records and papers relating to border history. After difficulties with printers and engravers the first volume of this series appeared in 1820.

It was not till 1827 that Hodgson was able to publish the second volume of his original prospectus, dealing with the parochial history of Northumberland, towards which he was helped by a subscription of £200 from Bishop Barrington. In 1828 was published the sixth volume, containing fresh documents and records. In 1832 another volume of the parochial history followed. The book met with little immediate success, and Hodgson suffered a loss on each volume. In 1835 he published an extra volume of his history, containing the Pipe rolls for Northumberland. In 1839 the third volume of the parochial history appeared, containing an account of the Roman wall, in which Hodgson first clearly established the claim of Emperor Hadrian to be considered as its builder. Notably, as the claim is not a claim about Northumbrian history, it is formatted as a 166-page footnote in the book, taking up about half the book's length. His health, however, gave way while this volume was passing through the press.

Hodgson used, amongst other sources, notes of Thomas Bell of the Society of Antiquaries. He did much research in the library at Capheaton. He left a hundred volumes of manuscript collectanea for the completion of his work. Later, the Antiquarian Society of Newcastle upon Tyne commissioned John Hodgson-Hinde to write an additional volume containing an introductory sketch of the history of the county, which was published in 1858.

The parochial history, as Hodgson had planned it, remained unfinished; proposals were made in 1891 for securing its completion. The Northumberland County History Committee was set up, and produced over more than 30 years a 15-volume continuation.

== Other works ==
The Roman camp of Longovicium at Lanchester attracted Hodgson's attention, and led him to study Roman antiquities. In 1807 he published Poems written at Lanchester; one of them is Langovicum, a Vision, is an account of the Roman camp. The volume was accompanied with antiquarian notes, which were used by Robert Surtees in his History of Durham. In 1810 he was employed to write the account of Northumberland for Edward Wedlake Brayley and John Britton's Beauties of England and Wales. It is generally thought that Hodgson's work is the best of that series of short county histories.

In 1812 he wrote for a Newcastle publisher The Picture of Newcastle-on-Tyne, a guide-book to the town, including research about the Roman Wall and the early history of the coal trade. Hodgson was also involved in the foundation of the Society of Antiquaries of Newcastle upon Tyne, which came into existence in 1813. The first three volumes of the Transactions of this society contain many papers by him. He collected materials for a history of his parish of Jarrow, which he never finished; his work on the subject is to be found in Archæologia Æliana, i. 112, and Collectanea Topographica, i. 66, &c. ii. 40, &c. Besides the works already mentioned Hodgson published The Nativity of Jesus Christ, &c. (Newcastle, 1810), and contributed papers to the Gentleman's Magazine from 1821 onwards, under the signature "Archæus".

A portrait of Hodgson, from a miniature by Miss Mackreth, was prefixed to vol. ii. part ii. of his History and is reproduced in Raine's Memoir.

== Later life and death ==
Hodgson's health was failing, and he lost three children. In 1833, he was appointed to the vicarage of the neighbouring parish of Hartburn, with a larger income. After much illness, he died on 12 June 1845, and was buried at Hartburn.
