= Felling mine disasters =

Series of English mine disasters between 1812 and 1847

Coordinates: 54°57′19″N 1°34′14″W

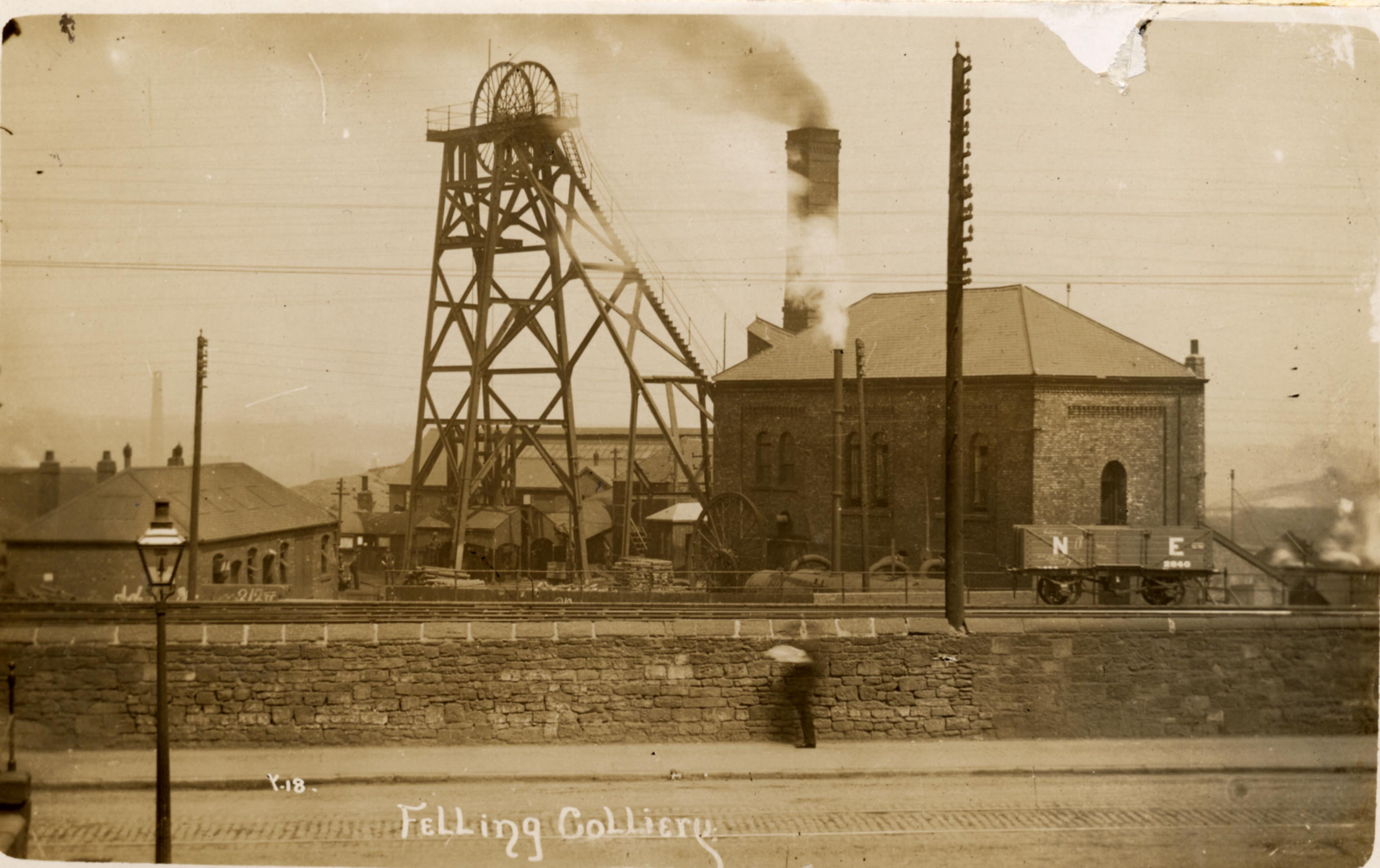
John Pit, Felling. The main access route to the colliery. Photograph undated, possibly late 19th century

The Felling Colliery (also known as Brandling Main) in Britain suffered four disasters in the 19th century, (Note: 5 or more killed, the definition used by the Durham Mining Museum) in 1812, 1813, 1821 and 1847. By far the worst of the four was the 1812 disaster which claimed 92 lives on 25 May 1812. The loss of life in the 1812 disaster was one of the motivators for the development of miners' safety lamps such as the Geordie lamp and the Davy lamp.

== Colliery description ==
The drawing is a copy of a published plan of the colliery at the time of the 1812 explosion

Felling is an area in the English county of Tyne and Wear. Mining of the upper seams had continued throughout the 18th century. Following borings starting in 1758, the main pit was opened in 1779. The first seam to be worked was the High Main which ceased production in 1811. Shortly before the High Main was exhausted, the pit was deepened to reach the Low Main which came into production in May 1811, just a year before the disaster. The Low Main lies 94 fathoms (564 ft; 172 m) below the surface and is 3 feet (0.91 m) thick. Subsequently two other seams, the Bensham (or Maudlin) and the Hutton were won.

To ensure adequate ventilation two shafts were dug, John Pit and William Pit. John Pit was the main access shaft and was the down-cast shaft where fresh air was drawn into the pit. A steam engine was provided for winding gear, and in 1812 there was a standby horse-whim for when the steam engine was out of use. (Note: Hodgson notes: "when it lies idle on pay Saturdays") William Pit was the up-cast or furnace pit and had a fire burning at its base. The rising hot air drew air though the mine from the down-cast pit. Above each of the two pits were pulleys, those over John Pit were 6 feet (1.8 m) in diameter. The pulleys for the horse-whim were mounted on a crane and kept out of the way, being swung over the pit mouth when required. This arrangement proved fortuitous in the aftermath of the disaster.

From the base of the pits a number of headings were first driven. Between the headings were driven stentings. An excavated area was called a board, broken up by walls. To ensure the air circulated throughout the mine some boards were blocked off with stoppings either of brick or timber. Openings in some of the stoppings allowed the movement of men and materials. When not being used the openings were closed by traps.

In an era before the invention of the safety lamp, the only practical source of light was a candle. Where explosive gas was suspected, a Spedding mill was used. A steel cylinder was revolved at high speed against a flint and the resulting shower of sparks gave some light. Although mills were safer than candles, the Wallsend colliery explosion of 1785 had shown that they could cause explosions.

== 1812 disaster ==
At 11:30 on Monday, 25 May 1812 the first explosion occurred. For half a mile around the earth shook and the noise was heard up to four miles away. Large clouds of dust and small coals were thrown up from both William Pit and John Pit. As well as the small particles, the coal baskets and pieces of wood were blown out of the pits and landed nearby. The dust fell like a shower for up to a mile and a half downwind. The pit-heads or shaft-frames carrying the pulleys at both pits were blown off, set on fire and the pulleys broken. At William Pit the up-cast fed to a horizontal flue on the surface which led to a stack. Coal dust was distributed three inches thick within this flue which then burnt to a "light cinder".

The pulleys for the horse-whim at John Pit were mounted in a crane kept swung away from the shaft. As a result they were undamaged and could be swung over the shaft. Men on the surface applied themselves in place of the horses and brought 33 survivors and 2 corpses out of the colliery. Three of the survivors subsequently died. 87 men and boys were left below ground.

45 minutes after the initial explosion, at 12:15, a rescue team descended the shaft. (Note: The men were Mr. Straker (viewer), Mr. Anderson, William Haswell (overman), Edward Rogers, John Wilson, Joseph Pearson, Henry Anderson, Michael Menham and Joseph Greener (keeper of the adjacent toll-bar).) Because of the firedamp they used Spedding mills to light their way. It was noted that the sparks fell "like dark drops of blood" due to the foul air. Having attempted two directions and being forced back by difficulty breathing they retreated to the pit bottom. The party ascended, but while two were still below and two were in the shaft a second explosion occurred. Haswell and H. Anderson were the two left below and they hung onto a pit prop whilst the blast lifted them and turned them.

The rescue team all agreed that there was no possibility of the men left below ground being alive. Two explosions, blackdamp (locally called choak-damp [sic]), fire and the lethal afterdamp made any rescue attempt impossible. The suggestion was made that the pit be stopped up to extinguish the fire. However, local recollections of three men who had survived for 40 days in a pit near Byker led to shouts of "murder" and obstruction.

=== Closure ===
On the following day, a crowd gathered around John Pit and accusations of cowardice were thrown around. Eventually the leaders of the crowd were won around. The owners offered "no expense should be spared" in executing a scheme of rescue but they refused to offer a reward since "they would be accessary to no man's death by persuasion or a bribe". William Pit was closed over with planks.

On Wednesday, Straker and William Haswell (the viewer and the overman) descended John Pit. The sparks from the Spedding mill were extinguished by the blackdamp and Haswell began staggering within 7 yards (6.4 m) due to the effects of the gas. Straker helped him to the shaft where it was still difficult to breathe even in the current of air. Two further men descended but could not move more than a few yards from the base of the shaft and their clothes had the smell of stinkdamp upon them. Smoke was seen ascending from John Pit, a sure sign of the fire below and so the base of John Pit was sealed with clay and planks laid over the mouth. Two days later William Pit was further sealed with clay.

=== Reopening and recovery ===
The pit was cautiously reopened on 4 July. The issuing gas was collected in bladders and tested. At first it exploded when released near a candle flame but by 8 July it was diluted enough not to do so. The pits were then opened fully on the 7th and allowed to vent. In the morning of the 8th, Straker, Anderson, Haswell and six others descended William shaft and found the air cool and wholesome.

Work on recovering the victims and securing the mine then started. All work was performed using Spedding mills for light. As the workers moved through the mine, all the various stoppings and traps had to be repaired to force the air current to fully ventilate it.

The parish priest for Jarrow and Heworth was the Reverend John Hodgson. As well as giving comfort to the bereaved, he was instrumental in persuading them to accept a common, speedy burial. The badly-decayed bodies had lain for seven weeks in the pit while the fires were extinguished. Dr. Ramsay gave his opinion that if the bodies were returned to their homes for a wake, "putrid fever" might spread throughout the neighbourhood.

Between 8 July and 19 September the business of recovering the dead and repairing the mine continued. Hodgson details the decayed and putrid state of some of the corpses; there was a fear that the bodies might fall apart. The recovery teams placed the bodies in coffins in the mine.

Identification was a problem. Mothers and widows failed to identify most of the bodies as "they were too much mangled and scorched to retain any of their features". Most were identified by clothes, tobacco-boxes, shoes and other items. (Note: Smoking and smoking materials were allowed in many pits (including Felling) at this date.)

Finally, on 20 September, 117 days after the explosion, the pit was inspected by candle light. The furnace below William Pit was relighted and the whole mine brought back into production. One body has never been found.

=== Analysis ===
The cause of the first explosion is not known for certain. The most probable cause was firedamp, there being no evidence of large amounts of coal dust in the air, the other significant risk.

After the first explosion the trap doors used for ventilation and the internal wall in the vicinity of the underground crane were observed to be in a good state by the men who escaped. Indeed, even the lamp at the crane was still burning. When the mine was reopened the area was found to be damaged: "the stoppings and trap-doors were blown down, the roof fallen and as great marks of destruction as in any other part of the mine". The area was near John Pit, the down-cast shaft where fresh air was entering the mine at its greatest velocity. Hodgson realised that this was significant and supposed that "the atmospheric current ... intercepted the progress of the first explosion, and prevented it from igniting the fire damp here".

Hodgson then proceeded to assume that the "choak-damp" (perhaps afterdamp rather than blackdamp) pressing upwards from the seat of the explosion forced a pocket of firedamp to where the coal was burning and set off the second explosion. However two paragraphs down he observed that the dust in the barrow-ways was burnt to a cinder. That coal dust raised by an initial explosion could be the cause of a further explosion was only starting to be understood in this period.

=== Aftermath ===
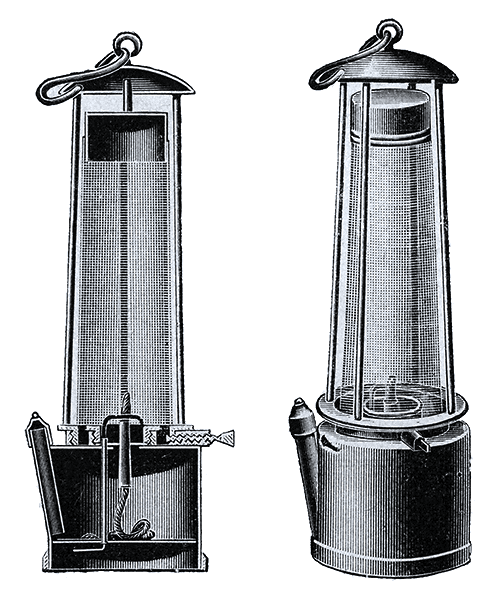
A Davy lamp, an early example of a safety lamp

The tragedy inspired Hodgson to raise public concern about the hazards of mining. Public interest was fed by a short (16-page) pamphlet written by him and published prior to the second disaster in late 1813. Hodgson wrote for an interested public, not for practical miners, and as such explains mining terms and procedures. His description and analysis of the two explosions was historically significant as one of the first to attempt a scientific analysis of such events.

On 1 October 1812 the Sunderland Society was set up consisting of clergymen, doctors, owners and mine managers. One of the doctors was William Reid Clanny who had already produced a first, impractical, safety lamp. Also present was George Stephenson who at that time was the enginewright for the collieries at Killingworth. The society aimed for greater publicity for accidents and their causes, the scientific study of ventilation, and the development of safety lamps.

Stephenson designed a safety lamp, known as the Geordie lamp, with air fed through narrow tubes, down which a flame could not move. It also led Sir Humphry Davy to devise another safety lamp, the Davy lamp, in which the flame was surrounded by iron gauze. The gauze had to have small spaces so that a flame could not pass through, but could admit methane, which then burned harmlessly inside the lamp. The height of the luminous cone above the flame gave a measure of the methane concentration in the atmosphere.

== 1813 disaster ==
On 24 December 1813 at 01:30 the colliery again exploded, this time with the loss of 9 men and 13 boys along with 12 horses. All the dead were in the headways by William Pit (the upcast pit). Those in the boards away from William Pit were saved. The Newcastle Courant reported the supposition that "the hydrogen [sic] took fire at the crane lamp, in the south headways". (Note: It was not commonly realised at the time that firedamp was essentially methane rather than hydrogen) Thomson also reports this but warns against too early an assumption, mentioning other possibilities such as the failure of a stopping or furnace mismanagement.

The southern boards were crossed by several fissures (dykes) from which periodic discharges of gas came through apertures called blowers. The blowers could make "the coals on the floor dance round their orifices, like gravel in a strong spring". The discharges were dealt with by the strong current of air, strong enough to extinguish candles.

None of the mine was found to be damaged by fire so after retrieval of the bodies and inspection of the mine it was reopened. On 30 December workmen found fire in part of the waste and as a result the mouths of the shafts were stopped up for a while.

== 1847 disaster ==
On Tuesday 22 June 1847, shortly after 21:00, another explosion occurred at the colliery. Six miners were killed, four outright and two by their injuries over the following two days. The surgeon employed by the mine owners tried, unsuccessfully, to treat the injured. Two of the dead were killed immediately by a fall of rock from the roof, the other two by afterdamp. As well as the human cost, eighteen horses were killed either by the explosion or by the afterdamp.

One of the survivors, Peter Gibbon, saw from his safety lamp that the air quality had changed. He commented to the man he was working with, George Chapman, "Do ye mind what a current of air there was!". (Note: "Do ye mind" means 'did you notice'.) Chapman had not noticed anything, but being in charge of the pit at the time he went off to investigate. Chapman was subsequently rescued, but died the following day. After an hour Gibbon tried to escape but broke his lamp and in the darkness was blocked by a roof fall; he was eventually rescued. Some of the men neither heard nor felt any shock despite significant damage being done, as commented upon in newspaper reports.

The viewer, Thomas Foster, stated to the Newcastle Guardian that Davy lamps were employed throughout the colliery and that all the men were given written instructions in their use. The old areas of the colliery released a lot of foul air, but there was "not a better ventilated colliery on the Tyne". Foster reported that 60,000 cubic feet (1,700 m^{3}) of air per minute was drawn down the shaft, a fact confirmed at the coroner's inquest.

The colliery overman, John Greener, told the coroner that he had gone down the pit after the explosion and "found the separation stoppings blown down, and the stables on fire". He penetrated up to 600 yards (550 m) from the shaft before being overcome by foul air and forced to retreat and go home due to the effect of the gas.

On Thursday evening, two days later a coroner's inquest was opened and adjourned until a full inspection could take place. The inquest reopened on the following Wednesday. Foster was the principal witness and he confirmed much that had earlier been reported; the pit was well ventilated and Davy lamps were in use.

The seat of the explosion was found by Foster to be an underground engine used to haul coals to the pit base. The engineman had added fresh coal to the fire and closed the damper before going off shift at 16:00. The damper should have remained slightly open to allow burnt gas from the fire to escape up the chimney. It was supposed that the damper had been closed fully and partial combustion had occurred, effectively generating town gas ("acting as a retort"). The gas eventually escaped and the resultant explosion caused major damage to the boiler and flue.

Four viewers from other pits all corroborated Foster's conclusions. The engineman, George Hope, said that he put on around 3½ pecks (Note: just under 1 imperial bushel (0.036 m^{3}).) of small coals and "left the damper open about an inch and three-quarters I always leave my fire this way". The coroner's jury returned a verdict of "Accidental Death". The jury recommended that a pin was placed in the damper to stop it from closing to less than 4 inches (100 mm).

== 1812 memorial ==
A memorial to 91 of the victims was placed in St Mary's Churchyard where most of the coffins were placed in a common grave. (Note: grid reference NZ 286,619) The monument has a square base with a square pyramid above. On each of the four faces is a brass plaque, listing the names and ages of the victims:

In Memory of the 91 Persons Killed in Felling Colliery 25 May 1812
| Name | Age | Name | Age |
|---|---|---|---|
| Phillip Allan | 17 | Will Hunter | 35 |
| Jacob Allan | 14 | John Hunter | 21 |
| Andrew Allan | 11 | Mich Hunter | 18 |
| Jos. Anderson | 23 | Rob Hutchinson | 11 |
| Thomas Bainbridge | 53 | Will Jacques | 23 |
| Matt Bainbridge | 19 | John Jacques | 14 |
| Thomas Bainbridge | 17 | James Kay | 18 |
| George Bainbridge | 10 | George Kay | 16 |
| Thomas Bears | 48 | John Knox | 11 |
| George Bell | 14 | George Lawton | 14 |
| Edward Bell | 12 | Rob C Leck | 16 |
| John Boutland | 46 | Chris Mason | 34 |
| Will Boutland | 19 | George Mitcheson | 18 |
| Matt Brown | 28 | John Pearson | 64 |
| John Burnitt | 21 | John Pearson | 38 |
| James Comby | 28 | George Pearson | 26 |
| James Craigs | 13 | Edward Pearson | 14 |
| Thomas Craggs | 36 | Rob Pearson | 10 |
| Thomas Craggs | 9 | Matt Pringle | 18 |
| Chris Cully | 20 | Jos. Pringle | 16 |
| George Cully | 14 | George Reay | 9 |
| William Dixon | 35 | Edward Richardson | 39 |
| William Dixon | 10 | Will Richardson | 19 |
| John A. Dobson | 13 | Thomas Richardson | 17 |
| Robert Dobson | 13 | Thomas Ridley | 13 |
| Dobson | (Note: Elsewhere his age is recorded as "a boy".) | George Ridley | 11 |
| Paul Fletcher | 22 | Thomas Robson | 18 |
| Will Galley | 22 | George Robson | 15 |
| Greg Galley | 10 | Will Sanderson | 43 |
| Mich Gardiner | 45 | Matt Sanderson | 33 |
| Will Gardiner | 10 | John Surtees | 12 |
| Robert Gordon | 40 | John Thompson | 36 |
| Joseph Gordon | 10 | Benjamin Thompson | 17 |
| Thomas Gordon | 8 | Jere. Turnbull | 43 |
| Isaac Greener | 65 | John Turnbull | 27 |
| Isaac Greener | 24 | Nick Urwin | 58 |
| John Greener | 21 | John Wilkinson | 35 |
| Ralph Hall | 18 | John Wilson | 52 |
| Robert Hall | 15 | John Wilson | 30 |
| Ralph Harrison | 39 | Jos. Wilson | 23 |
| Rob Harrison | 14 | Char Wilson | 20 |
| John Harrison | 12 | Joseph Wood | 39 |
| Rob Haswell | 42 | John Wood | 27 |
| John Haswell | 22 | Joseph Young | 30 |
| Edward Haswell | 20 | Thomas Young | 34 |
| Ben Haswell | 18 | | |

== See also ==
- Mining accident
