= Headlamp (outdoor) =

Light source affixed to the head

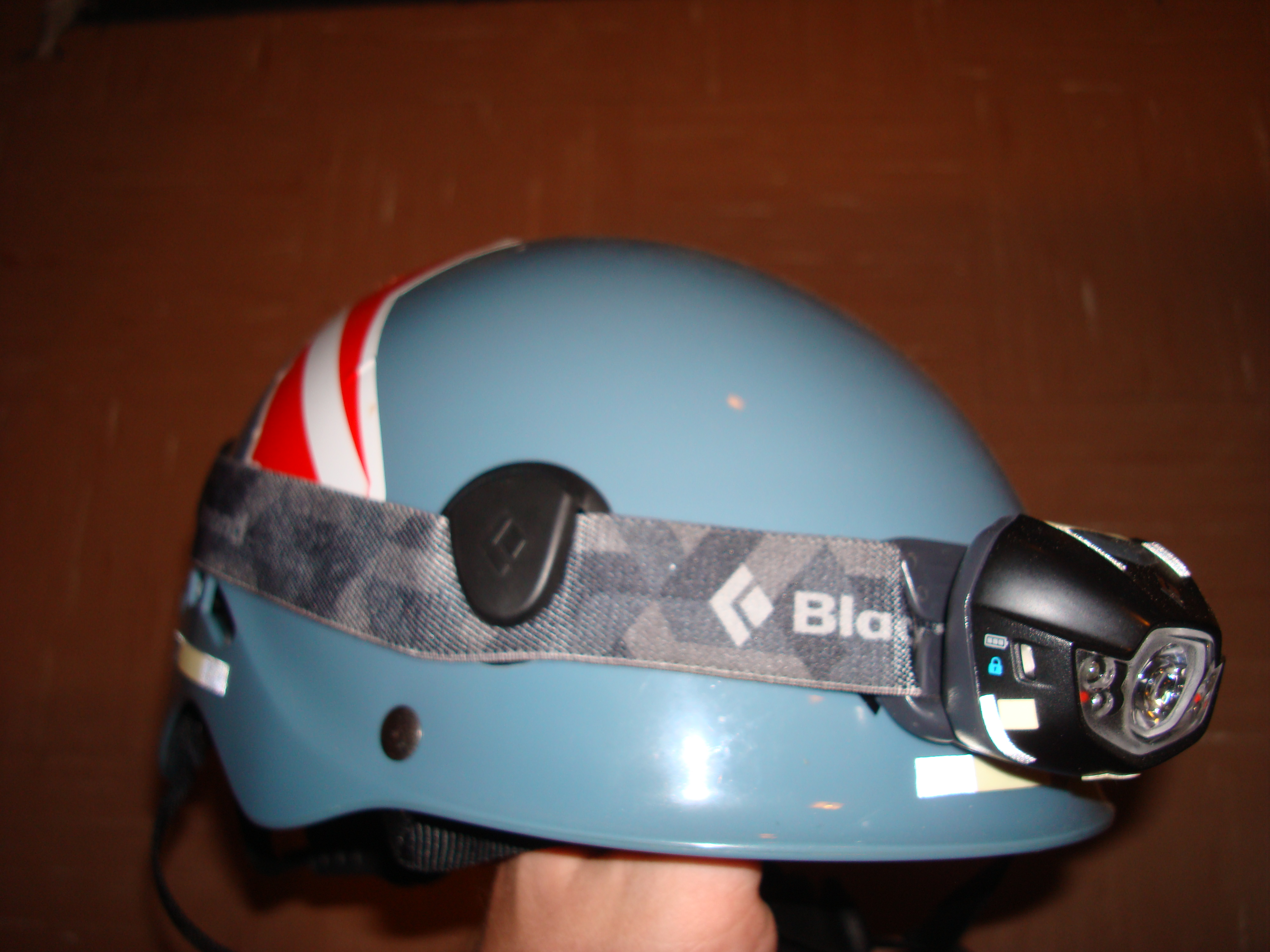
Headlamp attached to a helmet

A headlamp, headlight, or head torch (UK) is a light source affixed to the head typically for outdoor activities at night or in dark conditions such as caving, orienteering, hiking, skiing, backpacking, camping, mountaineering or mountain biking. Headlamps may also be used in adventure races. Headlamps are often used by workers in underground mining (the head-mounted forms of mining lamps), search and rescue, surgeons, and by other workers who need hands-free directed lighting.

== Description ==
Headlamps are usually powered by three or four AA or AAA batteries, or rechargeable batteries. Systems with heavier batteries (4xAA or more) are usually designed so that the light emitter is positioned near the front of the head, with the battery compartment at the rear of the head. The headlamp is strapped to the head or helmet with an elasticized strap. Some headlamps have a separate battery pack connected by a cable, to be carried on a belt or in a pocket.

Headlamps may be held in place by a single band around the head or (particularly heavier ones) have an additional band over the top of the head.

Incandescent bulbs were used in headlamps until the introduction of white LEDs of sufficient brightness, with much lower power consumption and lifespan. Power LEDs rated at 1 watt or more displaced incandescent bulbs in many models of headlamps. To avoid damage to electronic parts, a heatsink is usually required for headlamps that use LEDs that dissipate more than 1W. To regulate power fed to the LEDs, DC-DC converters are often used, sometimes controlled by microprocessors. This allows the LED(s) to maintain constant brightness until battery voltage becomes too low to operate the lamp, and allows selectable brightness. Following the introduction of LEDs for headlamps, sometimes combinations of LED and halogen lamps were used, allowing the user to select between the types for various tasks.

== History ==
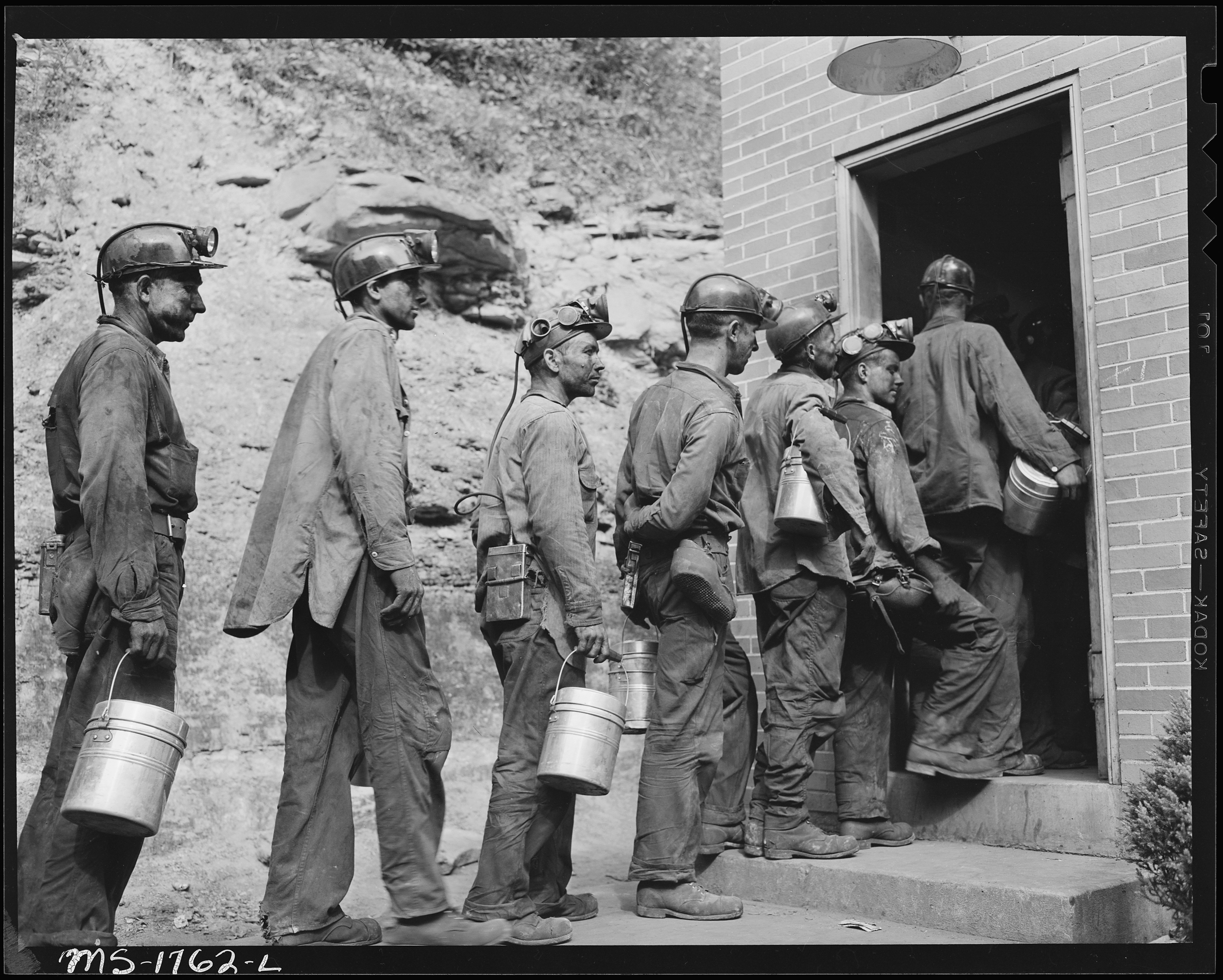
Coal miners wearing headlamps in 1946. At the end of the shift the lamps would be checked into the lamp house for recharging and maintenance.

Carbide lamps were developed around 1900, and continued to be used after the introduction of battery lamps, which initially had poor battery life. Battery-powered headlamps with incandescent bulbs were used until the advent of LED lamps with much higher efficiency and consequently longer battery life.

Thomas Edison developed electric cap lamps for miners in 1914; by 1915, certain cap lamps were approved by the United States Bureau of Mines for safe use where there may be inflammable gas as in coal mines. These included features such as spring-loaded contacts to automatically disconnect broken bulbs. These lamps consisted of an incandescent lamp with a reflector, and a belt-mounted wet-cell storage battery sized to power the lamp for the entire working shift. After 12 hours a 1917-era miner's lamp produced less than one candlepower and about 2 to 5 total lumens. This pattern became popular for similar lamps. Head lamps approved for use in coal mines are designed not to allow an internal spark to ignite flammable gas surrounding the headlamp.

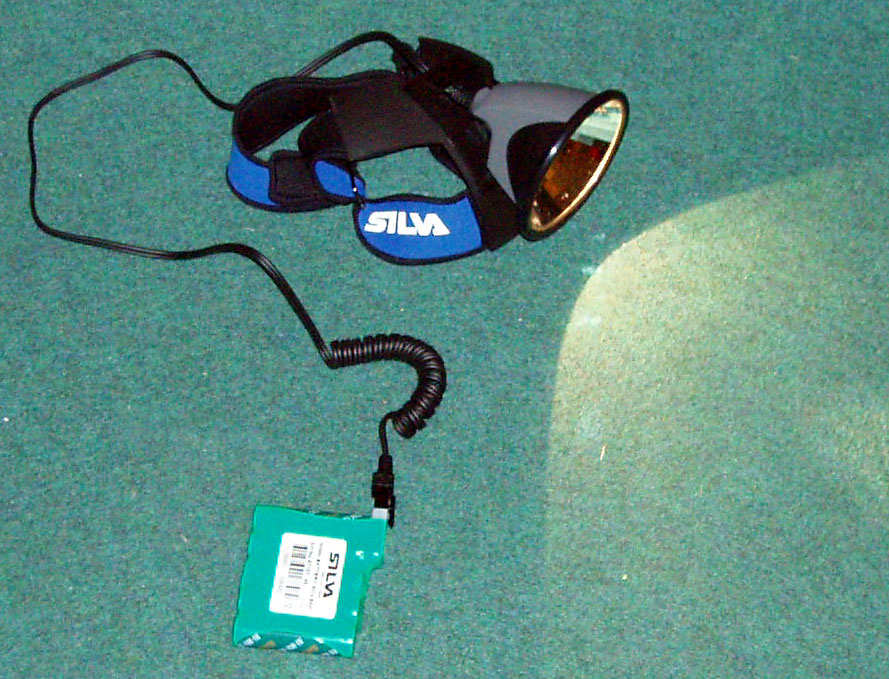
Halogen headlamp primarily used for night orienteering with separate battery case and lamp

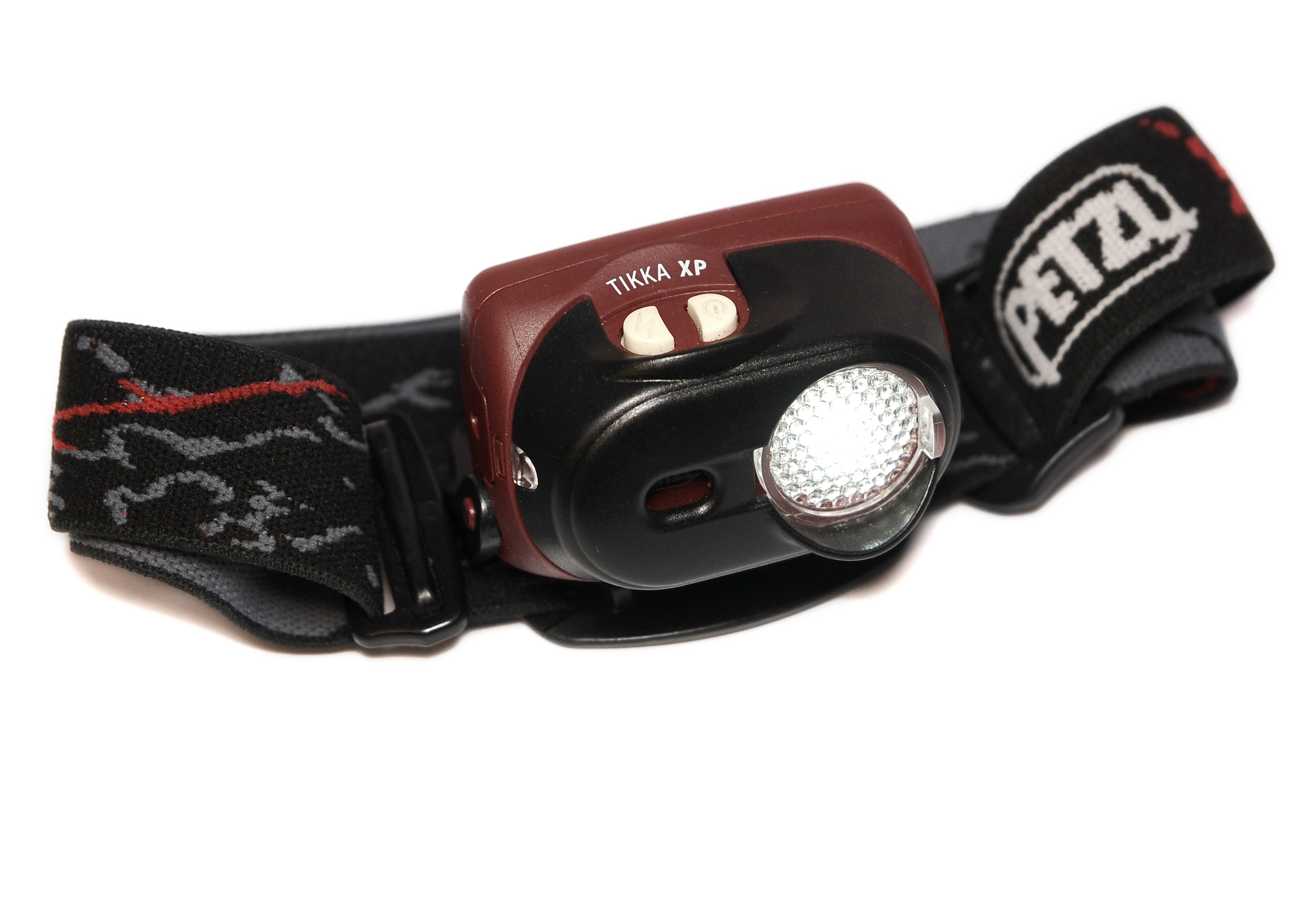
LED headlamp with batteries and lamp combined

== Functions ==
While a head torch has the function of fitting on a person's head, being capable of being switched on and off, and illumination in front, there are many variations for different purposes. They include:

- Being waterproof
- Variable light level, and flashing
- Motion sensor to allow switching on and off by waving a hand with no need to operate a switch
- Optional red light mode to preserve night vision
- Both rechargeable and disposable batteries supported, to be able to provide light after the rechargeable battery is discharged
- Beam may be narrow (spot), broad (flood), or focusable
- Lamp angle may be adjusted between forward to downward
- Maximum brightness may range from adequate for close work (e.g., 50 lumens), to very bright

== See also ==
- Carbide lamp
- Flashlight
- Headlamp
- Mining lamp §Variants
- Safety lamp
- Wheat lamp
