= Evan Thomas (inventor) =

Welsh ironmonger, inventor, and manufacturer (died after 1881)

Evan Thomas (died after 1881) was a Welsh ironmonger who became an inventor and manufacturer of safety lamps for miners. He was the original proprietor of the Cambrian Lamp Works, established in Aberdare in 1860.

In 1867, Thomas patented an improvement to the design of the safety lamp that would prevent the glass in the lamp from becoming loose by using india rubber. In 1868, he obtained a patent for "an improvement in the construction of miners' safety lamps, in such a manner as to enable petroleum or other mineral oils to be consumed therein". Thomas's best-selling lamp, the "no. 7", improved on a lamp invented in 1816 by William Reid Clanny, and was successful in passing tests set in 1886 by the Royal Commission on Accidents in Mines; it was selected as one of the four recommended types of lamp.

In 1879, Evan Thomas was reported to have gone into partnership with John Davies in the ironmongery he ran in Ferndale. This partnership was separate to the lamp business, and Thomas exhibited under his own name at the 1881 International Electric Exhibition at Crystal Palace. At some stage, Thomas went into partnership with a Mr Williams, to create the company known as Evan Thomas & Williams.

After 1978, the firm continued to trade from an address in Robertstown Industrial Estate, Aberdare. Evan Thomas & Williams were believed to be the oldest surviving firm of safety lamp manufacturers in the world, and continued to make replica lamps after the closure of the last mines in the South Wales Coalfield.
