= Thomas Bell (antiquarian) =

English land surveyor, antiquary and book seller

- Born: 16 December 1785; Newcastle upon Tyne, Northumberland, England
- Died: 30 April 1860 (aged 74); Newcastle upon Tyne, Northumberland, England
- Occupations: Land Surveyor; Antiquary; Book seller

Thomas Bell (16 December 1785 – 30 April 1860) was a land surveyor, antiquary and book seller.

He was also a prodigious collector of books, having accumulated more than 15,000 volumes by the time he died. These were auctioned off later the same year.

== Life ==
Thomas Bell was born in Newcastle upon Tyne. His father was John Bell (1755–1816), like the son a land surveyor and book seller. His mother, born Margaret Gray, was from County Durham. Thomas Bell had a brother, John Bell (1783–1864), two years older than he was, and whose life would in some respects follow a parallel course to his own. On leaving school both John and Thomas Bell worked with their father in the latter's book selling business along Union Street, later joined by a third brother, James Maddison Bell. Eventually the brothers took over the business from their father, but in the meantime John Bell (1783–1864) moved out in 1803 to set up in business on his own, which evidently left their father's business increasingly dependent on Thomas Bell who also increasingly took over his father's surveying work.

Later in his life, especially after his father's death, Thomas Bell became one of the principal land surveyors of his time and place, numbering among his clients, the Dukes of Northumberland and the Earls of Strathmore. The ongoing enclosure of (previously) common land by commercial farmers and, by the middle of the nineteenth century, the building of major railway lines provided abundant work for a well connected land surveyor. He was involved in surveying for the Brandling Junction Railway (BJR) as well as for the Newcastle & Carlisle Railway (N&CR), and Stanhope and Tyne Railway (S&TR) lines.

Bell was a collector of books. His particular interests included his own region, including both topography and genealogy. Although he was not himself a prolific author (he wrote one children's book), he did accumulate various manuscript researches on matters which interested him. He was able to provide much practical help to John Hodgson with the latter's well regarded History of Northumberland. In June 1813 Thomas Bell joined the Society of Antiquaries of Newcastle upon Tyne. He was also a member of the London-based Society of Antiquaries.

Thomas Bell died at 16 Cumberland Tow in Newcastle on 30 April 1860. His body was placed in the family plot in the "old cemetery" at Jesmond.

== Bibliography ==
- —— (1824). Tom Thumb's Play-book to Teach Children Their Letters as Soon as They Can Speak: Or, Easy Lessons for Little Children and Beginners.
