= Geordie lamp =

Miners' lamp invented by George Stephenson in 1815

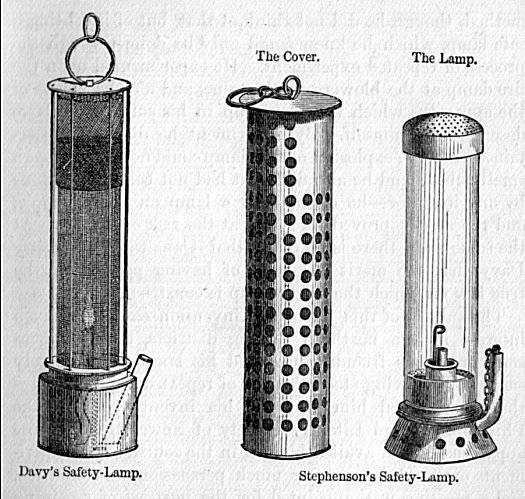
Stephenson's safety lamp shown with Davy's lamp on the left

The Geordie lamp was a safety lamp for use in flammable atmospheres, invented by George Stephenson in 1815 as a miner's lamp to prevent explosions due to firedamp in coal mines.

== Origin ==
In 1815, Stephenson was the engine-wright at the Killingworth Colliery in Northumberland and had been experimenting for several years with candles close to firedamp emissions in the mine. In August, he ordered an oil lamp, which was delivered on 21 October and tested by him in the mine in the presence of explosive gases. He improved this over several weeks with the addition of capillary tubes at the base so that it gave more light, and tried new versions on 4 and 30 November. This was presented to the Literary and Philosophical Society of Newcastle upon Tyne (Lit & Phil) on 5 December 1815.

Although controversy arose between Stephenson's design and the Davy lamp (invented by Humphry Davy in the same year), Stephenson's original design worked on significantly different principles from Davy's final design. If the lamp were sealed except for a restricted air ingress (and a suitably sized chimney) then the presence of dangerous amounts of firedamp in the incoming air would (by its combustion) reduce the oxygen concentration inside the lamp so much that the flame would be extinguished. Stephenson had convinced himself of the validity of this approach by his experiments with candles near lit blowers: as lit candles were placed upwind of the blower, the blower flame grew duller; with enough upwind candles, the blower flame went out.

To guard against the possibility of a flame travelling back through the incoming gases (an explosive backblast), air ingress was by a number of small-bore tubes through which the ingress air flowed at a higher velocity than the velocity of a flame fueled by a mixture of firedamp (mostly methane) and air. These ingress tubes were physically separate from the exhaust chimney. The body of the lamp was lengthened to give the flame a greater convective draw, and thus allow a greater inlet flow restriction and make the lamp less sensitive to air currents. The lamp itself was surrounded by glass, which had an additional perforated metal tube surrounding it for protection. Davy had originally attempted a safety lamp on similar principles, before preferring to enclose the flame inside a brass gauze cylinder; he had publicly identified the importance of allowing the restricted airflow in through small orifices (in which the flame velocity is lower) before Stephenson had, and he and his adherents remained convinced that Stephenson had not made this discovery independently. (Note: Later experiments in 1968 determined the mean maximum quenching diameter (the maximum hole diameter through which a flame, not an explosion, will not pass; this measurement is unaffected by the air flow velocity) for drilled holes in 1/32" thick brass plate to be 0.139 inches for methane/air mixtures. Stephenson's first lamp had a 1/2" air inlet, throttled by a slider, the second three air inlets of internal diameter 3/22" (0.136") but distorted by bending at the tip to give an oval, long diameter 1/5", short diameter 1/14", in his third lamp, air ingress was through brass plates with holes of various sizes, the largest about 1/12" diameter) Later on, Stephenson adopted Davy's gauze to surround the lamp (instead of the perforated metal tube) and the intake tubes were changed to holes or a gallery at the base of the lamp. It was this revised design that was used for most of the 19th century as the Geordie lamp.

One advantage of Stephenson's initial design over Davy's was that if the proportion of firedamp became too high, his lamp would be extinguished, whereas Davy's lamp could become dangerously hot. This was illustrated in the Oaks colliery at Barnsley on 20 August 1857 where both types of lamp were in use.

Stephenson's design also allowed better light output as it used glass to surround the flame, which cut out less of the light than Davy's, where the gauze surrounded it. But this also posed the danger of breakage in the harsh conditions of mineworking, a problem which was not resolved until the invention of safety glass.

The Geordie lamp continued to be used in the north-east of England through most of the 19th century, until the introduction of electric lighting.

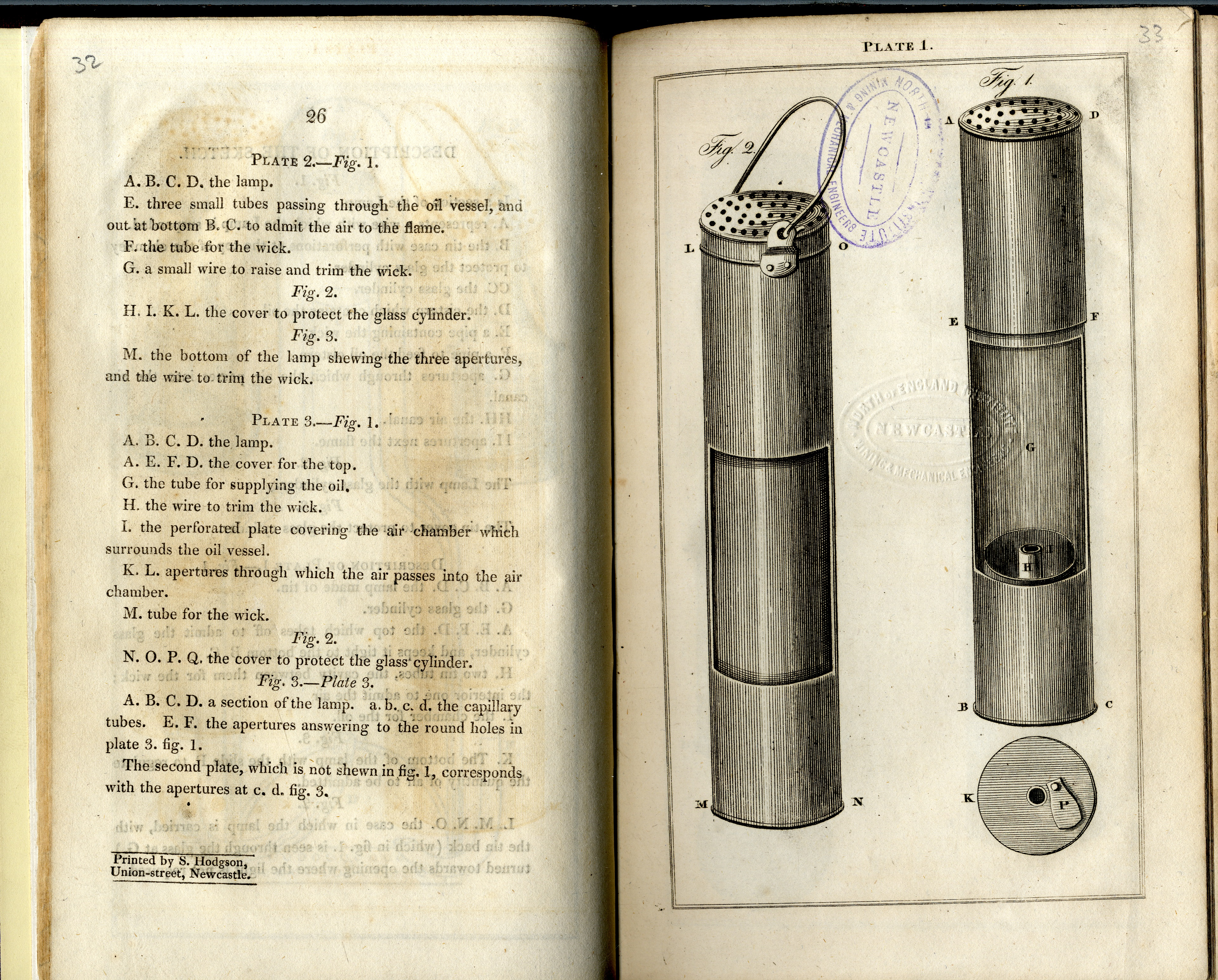
Plate 1 and descriptive text for this, and plate 2, from page 32-33 of Report Upon the Claims of Mr. George Stephenson, Relative to the Invention of His Safety Lamp, by the Committee Appointed at a Meeting Holden in Newcastle November 1st 1817

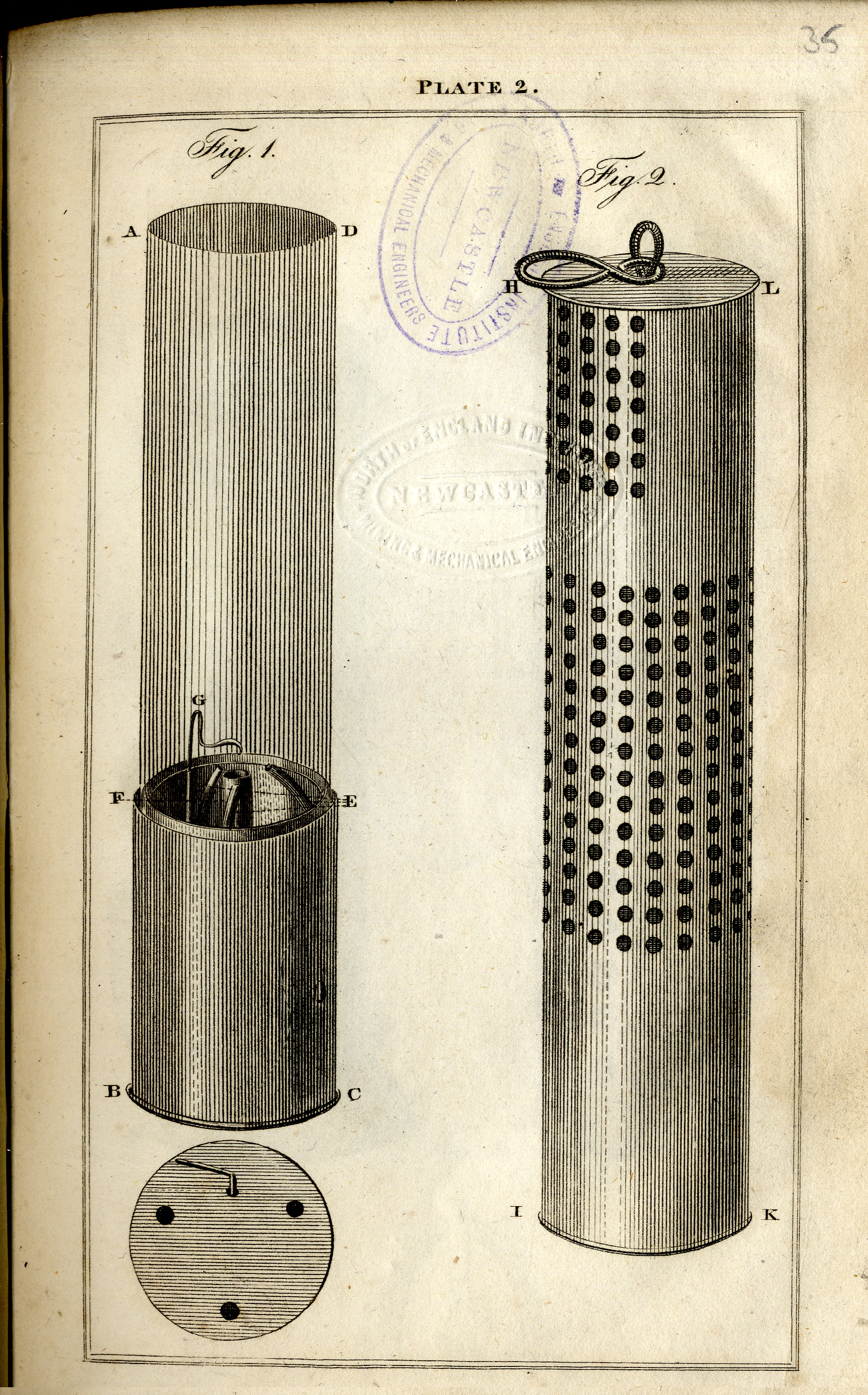
George Stephenson's safety lamp as drawn in 1817.

== See also ==
- List of light sources
- Davy lamp
- Safety lamp
- Wheat lamp
