= Safety lamp =

Any of several types of lamp that provides illumination in coal mines

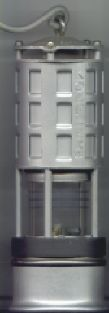
Modern flame safety lamp used in mines, manufactured by Koehler

A safety lamp is any of several types of lamp that provides illumination in places such as coal mines where the air may carry coal dust or a build-up of flammable gases, which may explode if ignited, possibly by an electric spark. Until the development of effective electric lamps in the early 1900s, miners used flame lamps to provide illumination. Open flame lamps could ignite flammable gases which collected in mines, causing explosions; safety lamps were developed to enclose the flame to prevent it from igniting the explosive gases. Flame safety lamps have been replaced for lighting in mining with sealed explosion-proof electric lights, but continue to be used to detect gases.

== Background ==
=== Damps or gases ===
Miners have traditionally referred to the various gases encountered during mining as damps, from the Middle Low German word dampf (meaning "vapour"). Damps are variable mixtures and are historic terms.

- Firedamp – Naturally occurring flammable mixtures, principally methane.
- Blackdamp or chokedamp – Nitrogen and carbon dioxide mixture with no oxygen. Formed by complete combustion of firedamp or occurring naturally. Coal in contact with air will oxidize slowly and, if unused workings are not ventilated, pockets of blackdamp may develop. Also referred to as azotic air in some 19th-century papers.
- Whitedamp – Formed by the incomplete combustion of coal, or firedamp. The mixture may contain significant amounts of carbon monoxide, which is toxic and potentially explosive.
- Stinkdamp – Naturally occurring hydrogen sulphide and other gases. The hydrogen sulphide is highly toxic, but easily detected by smell. The other gases with it may be firedamp or blackdamp.
- Afterdamp – The gas from an explosion of firedamp or coal dust. Contains varying proportions of blackdamp and whitedamp and is therefore suffocating, toxic, explosive, or any combination of these. Afterdamp may also contain stinkdamp. Afterdamp may be more dangerous following an explosion than the explosion itself.

=== Open-flame illumination ===
Before the invention of safety lamps, miners used candles with open flames. This gave rise to frequent explosions. For example, at one colliery (Killingworth) in the north east of England, 10 miners were killed in 1806 and 12 in 1809. In 1812, 90 men and boys were suffocated or burnt to death in the Felling Pit near Gateshead and 22 in the following year.

Wood 1853 describes the testing of a mine for firedamp. A candle is prepared by being trimmed and excess fat removed. It is held at arm's length at floor level in one hand, the other hand shielding out all except the tip of the flame. As the candle is raised the tip is observed and if unchanged the atmosphere is safe. If however the tip turns bluish-gray increasing in height to a thin extended point becoming a deeper blue, then firedamp is present. Upon detecting firedamp the candle is lowered and arrangements made for the ventilating of the area or the deliberate firing of the firedamp after the end of a shift. To fire the gas, a man edged forward with a lit candle on the end of a stick. He kept his head down to allow the explosion to pass over him, but as soon as the explosion had occurred stood as upright as possible to avoid the afterdamp. Officially known as a fireman, he was also referred to as a penitent or monk from the hooded garb he wore as protection. The protective clothing was made of well-dampened wool or leather. This was a job with risk of injury, or to life.

When they came into regular use, barometers were used to tell if atmospheric pressure was low, which could lead to more firedamp seeping out of the coal seams into the mine galleries. This continued to be essential information even after the introduction of safety lamps; at Trimdon Grange there was an accident involving pressure.

The lack of good lighting was a major cause of the eye affliction nystagmus. Miners working in thin seams or when undercutting the coal had to lie on their side in cramped conditions. The pick was swung horizontally to a point beyond the top of their head. In order to see where they were aiming (and accurate blows were needed), the eyes needed to be straining in what would normally be the upwards and slightly to one side direction. This straining led first to temporary nystagmus and then to a permanent disability. Mild nystagmus would self-correct if a miner ceased to perform this work, but if left untreated would force a man to give up mining. The lower levels of light emitted by safety lamps caused an increase in the incidence of nystagmus.

=== First attempts at safe lamps ===
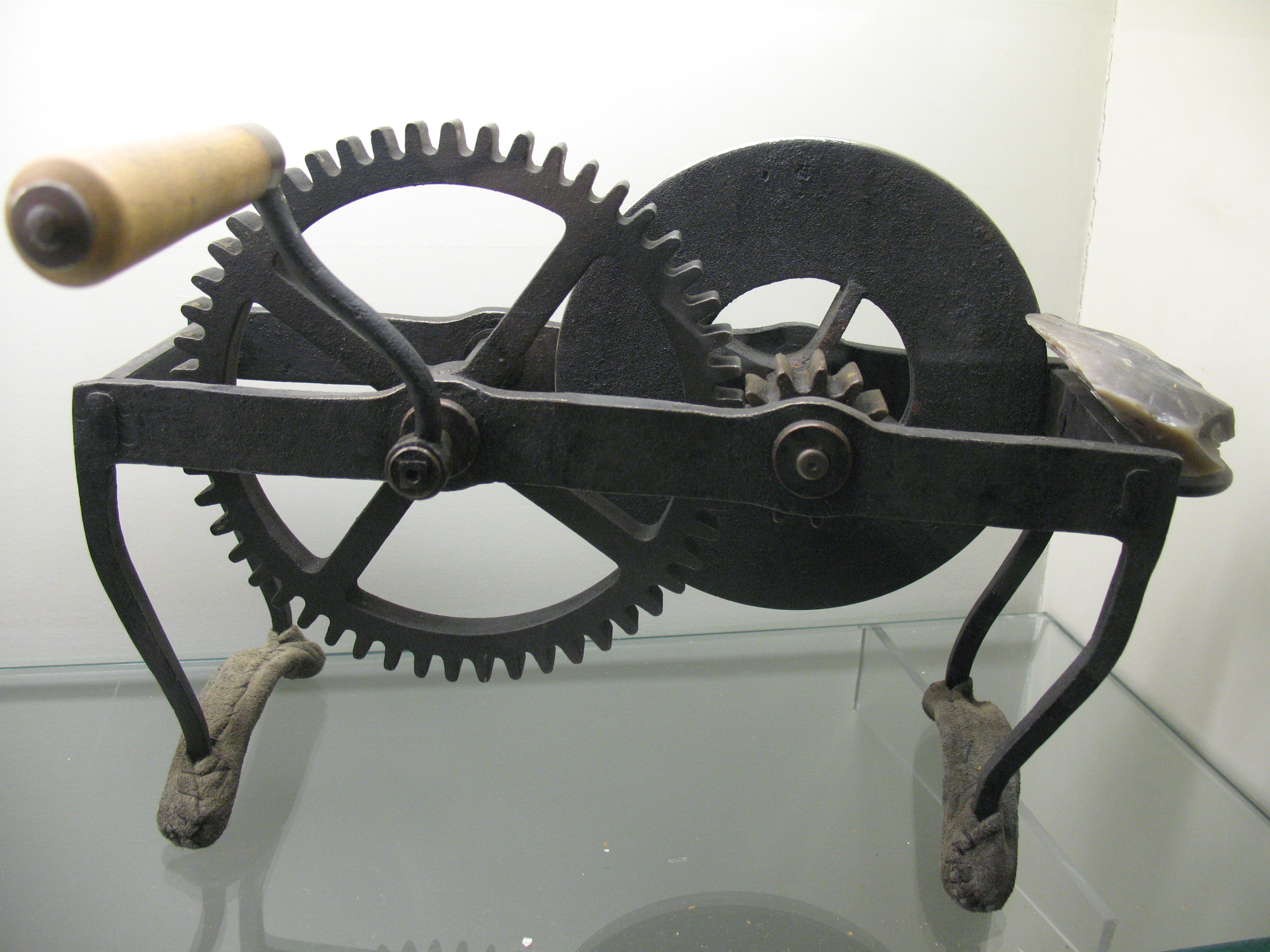
Spedding mill at the German mining museum, Bochum, Northrhine-Westfalia, Germany

In Europe and Britain dried fish skins which emitted a faint bioluminescence (often called phosphorescence) were used.

Flint and steel mills introduced by Carlisle Spedding (1696–1755) before 1733 had been tried with limited success. An example of a Spedding steel mill may be seen in the museum at Whitehaven where Spedding was manager of the collieries of Sir James Lowther, 4th Baronet. A steel disk was rotated at high speed by a crank mechanism. Pressing a flint against the disk produced a shower of sparks and dim illumination. These mills were troublesome to use and were often worked by a boy, whose only task was to provide light for a group of miners. It was assumed that the sparks had insufficient energy to ignite firedamp until a series of explosions at Wallsend colliery in 1784; a further explosion in June 1785, which the operator of the mill survived, showed that ignition was possible.

The first safety lamp made by William Reid Clanny used a pair of bellows to pump air through water to a candle burning in a metal case with a glass window. Exhaust gases passed out through water. The lamp was intrinsically safe provided it was kept upright, but gave out only a weak light. It was heavy and ungainly and required a man to pump it continuously. It was not a practical success, and Clanny subsequently changed the basis of operation of later lamps in the light of the Davy and Stephenson lamps.

== Oil lamps ==
=== Principles of operation ===
Safety lamps have to address the following issues:

- Provide adequate light
- Do not trigger explosions
- Warn of a dangerous atmosphere

Fire requires three elements to burn: fuel, oxidant and heat; the triangle of fire. Remove one element of this triangle and the burning will stop. A safety lamp has to ensure that the triangle of fire is maintained inside the lamp, but cannot pass to the outside.

Since any breathable atmosphere contains oxygen, and a safety lamp's raison d'être is to operate in an atmosphere also containing fuel (firedamp or coal dust), the element which must be blocked is heat. The key to manufacturing a successful safety lamp is to control the transfer of heat while still allowing air (the necessary oxidant) to enter and leave the lamp.

There are three main paths by which heat must be prevented from leaving the lamp:

- convection of the exhaust gases,
- conduction through the lamp body, and
- burning of the incoming firedamp passing back through the inlet.

In the Geordie lamp, the inlet and exhausts are kept separate. Restrictions in the inlet ensure that only just enough air for combustion passes through the lamp. A tall chimney contains the spent gases above the flame. If the percentage of firedamp starts to rise, less oxygen is available in the air and combustion is diminished or extinguished. Early Geordie lamps had a simple pierced copper cap over the chimney to further restrict the flow and to ensure that the vital spent gas did not escape too quickly. Later designs used metal mesh or gauze for the same purpose, and also as a barrier in itself. The inlet is through a number of fine tubes (early) or through a gallery (later). In the case of the gallery system air passes through a number of small holes into the gallery and through wire gauze to the lamp. The tubes both restrict the flow and ensure that any back flow is cooled. The flame front travels more slowly in narrow tubes (a key Stephenson observation) and allows the tubes to effectively stop such a flow.

In the Davy system, a metal gauze surrounds the flame and extends for a distance above forming a cage; flames do not pass through a fine enough mesh. All except the very earliest Davy lamps have a double layer at the top of the cage. Rising hot gases are cooled by the gauze, the metal conducting the heat away and being itself cooled by the incoming air. There is no restriction on the air entering the lamp; if firedamp is present it will get through the mesh and burn within the lamp itself, but without igniting gas outside. As the lamp burns brighter in dangerous atmospheres it acts as a warning to miners of rising firedamp levels. The Clanny configuration uses a short glass section around the flame with a gauze cylinder above it. Air is drawn in and descends just inside the glass, passing up through the flame in the centre of the lamp.

The outer casings of lamps are made of materials such as brass or tinned steel, which do not make a spark if they strike rock.

=== History and development ===
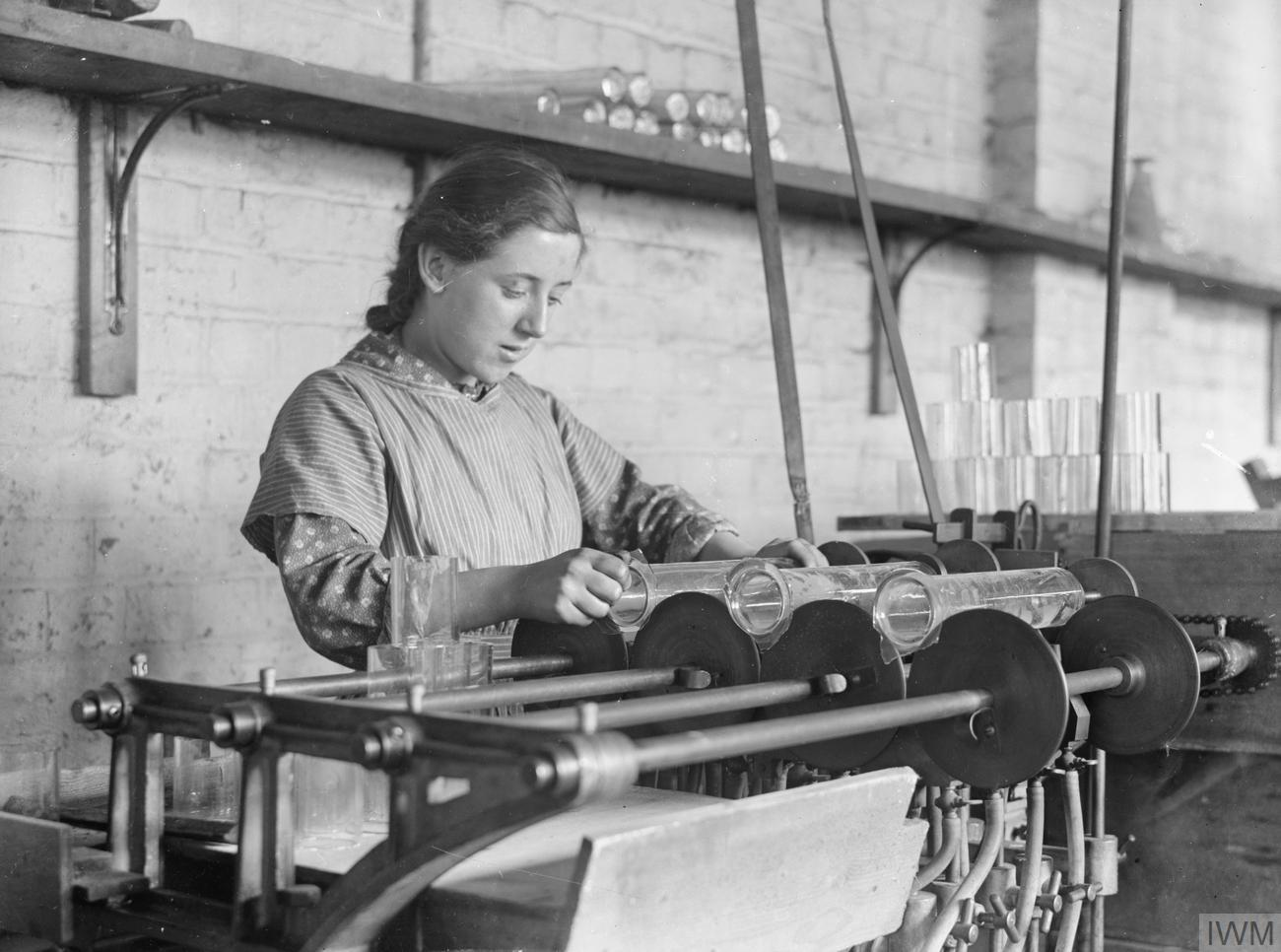
A worker cutting glass for mining lamps, September 1918

Within months of Clanny's demonstration of his first lamp, two improved designs had been announced: one by George Stephenson, which later became the Geordie lamp, and the Davy lamp, invented by Sir Humphry Davy. Subsequently, Clanny incorporated aspects of both lamps and produced the ancestor of all modern oil safety lamps.

George Stephenson came from a mining family and by 1804 had secured the post of brakesman at Killingworth colliery. He was present at both the 1806 and 1809 explosions in the pit. By 1810, he was engineman and responsible for machinery both above and below ground. The pit was a gassy pit and Stephenson took the lead in work to extinguish a fire in 1814. For some years prior to 1815 he had been experimenting on the blowers or fissures from which gas erupted. He reasoned that a lamp in a chimney could create a sufficient updraft that firedamp would not penetrate down the chimney. Further observations of the speed of flame fronts in fissures and passageways led him to design a lamp with fine tubes admitting the air.

Sir Humphry Davy was asked to consider the problems of a safety lamp following the Felling explosion. Previous experimenters had used coal gas (chiefly carbon monoxide) incorrectly, believing it to be the same as firedamp. Davy, however, performed his experiments with samples of firedamp collected from pits. As an experimental chemist, he was familiar with the inability of flames to pass through mesh; his experiments enabled him to determine the correct size and fineness for a miner's lamp.

Davy was awarded the Rumford Medal and £1,000 by the Royal Society in 1816 and a £2,000 prize by the country's colliery owners, who also awarded 100 guineas (£105) to Stephenson. The Newcastle committee also awarded Stephenson a £1,000 prize collected by subscription. Clanny was awarded a medal by the Royal Society of Arts in 1816.

Both the Davy and Stephenson lamps were fragile. The gauze in the Davy lamp rusted in the damp air of a coal pit and became unsafe, while the glass in the Stephenson lamp was easily broken, and allowed the flame to ignite firedamp in the mine; later Stephenson designs also incorporated a gauze screen as a protection against glass breakage. Developments, including the Gray, Mueseler and Marsaut lamps, tried to overcome these problems by using multiple gauze cylinders, but glass remained a problem until toughened glass became available.

Improper use of safety lamps defeated the purpose of the safety lamp and caused risk. When the flame went out in a lamp there was a temptation for the collier to open and relight it. Some opened the lamps to light tobacco pipes underground. Both of these practices were strictly forbidden. The miner was expected to return to the shaft, a round trip of up to a few miles, to relight an extinguished lamp. For men on piece work paid for what they produced, a relighting could cost them perhaps 10% of their day's pay, encouraging them to take the risk. Miners would also damage the mesh to make the lamp brighter. To prevent dangerous relighting (or opening the lamp to light a pipe), from the mid-century onwards, and particularly after the 1872 act, lamps had to have a lock mechanism which prevented the miner opening the lamp. Two schemes existed: either a special tool was required which was kept at the pit head, or else opening the lamp extinguished the flame. The latter mechanism can be seen in the Mueseler, Landau, and Yates lamps below. Such a lamp was known as a protector lamp, a term picked up and used as a company name. Only on the return to the bank could the lamp man open the lamp for refilling and service. Various different locking mechanisms were developed; miners tended to be ingenious in finding ways of circumventing them. A number of additional lit lamps were supposed to accompany each gang of men, but restricting the number was an obvious economy for the pit owners.

The light given out by these lamps was poor (particularly Davy's, obscured by the gauze); early lamps gave less light than candles. This was not resolved until the introduction of electric lighting around 1900, and the introduction of battery-powered helmet lamps in 1930. The poor light provided yet another reason for miners to try to circumvent the locks.

The gauze in early lamps (the Davy, Geordie and Clanny) was exposed to air currents. It was quickly discovered that an air current could cause the flame, in effect, to pass through the gauze: the flame playing directly on the mesh heats it faster than the heat can be conducted away, increasing its temperature until sufficient to ignite the gas outside the lamp.

The following data is compiled from Hunt 1879, article: Safety lamps:

Lamp	Air velocity to cause flame to pass the gauze		Time to explosion	Number of lamps to equal 1 standard candle	Hours to burn 2 oz (59 ml) of oil
Lamp	ft/s	m/s	Time to explosion	Number of lamps to equal 1 standard candle	Hours to burn 2 oz (59 ml) of oil
Davy	8 ft/s	2.4 m/s	15 s	4.63	16
Clanny	9 ft/s	2.7 m/s	45 s	2.68	16.5
Geordie	11.2 ft/s	3.4 m/s	28 s		

Following accidents such as Wallsend (1818), Trimdon Grange (1882) and the Bedford Colliery Disaster (1886), lamps had to be shielded against such currents. In the case of the Davy, a "Tin-can Davy" was developed which had a metal cylinder with perforations at the bottom and a glass window for the light from the gauze. Clanny derived lamps had a metal "bonnet" (typically of tinned iron) in the shape of a truncated cone covering the gauze above the glass cylinder. The important point was that no direct current of air could impinge on the gauze itself. The shields had the disadvantage of not allowing the collier or the deputy to check that the gauze was in place and clean. Lamps were therefore made so that they could be inspected and then the bonnet placed on and locked.

Davy used a fine wire gauze with a mesh of 784 holes per square inch (28 mesh). The required fineness of the mesh was scrutinised by the Miners' Lamp Committee in 1924, 109 years after Davy's work, and a recommendation to use a coarser mesh of 400 holes/sq in (20 mesh) of 27SWG wire was made. Lamps tested were as safe, and illumination increased, depending on lamp type, by between 16% and 32%.

=== Timeline of development ===
1730
Spedding invents his steel mill.
9 June 1785
Wallsend colliery explosion. Caused by a Spedding mill.
25 May 1812
Felling pit disaster claimed 92 lives. This was the final stimulus to both Stephenson and (indirectly) Davy to start their researches.
10 October 1812
Serious explosion (24 lives lost) at Mill Pit in Herrington near Sunderland.
20 May 1813
William Allen announces William Reid Clanny's lamp to the Royal Society of Arts in London. The original lamp was subsequently refined and reduced in weight to 34 ounces (960 g).
1 October 1813
Institution of the "Society for preventing Accidents in Coal Mines, later known as the Sunderland Society.
1815
Clanny lamp tried out at Mill Pit, Herrington and found to be impractical.
21 October 1815
Oil lamp (flame enclosed by glass, restricted air ingress through a single throttleable tube) delivered to George Stephenson for trials to identify safe opening size
3 November 1815
At a 'meeting of the Coal Trade' in Newcastle upon Tyne, England, a private letter from Sir Humphry Davy announcing progress to date in developing a safety lamp is read out. Davy's letter mentions four different possible designs; none involve surrounding the flame with wire gauze; one (flame enclosed by glass, restricted air ingress through small-bore tubes) roughly matches Stephenson's second design.
4 November 1815
Stephenson tests improved lamp (air access by three small-bore tubes to give more light) at Killingworth colliery.
9 November 1815
At a meeting of the Royal Society in London Davy presents the paper describing his lamp.
30 November 1815
Further improved lamp tested by Stephenson.
5 December 1815
Stephenson lamp demonstrated at a meeting of the Literary and Philosophical Society of Newcastle.
9 January 1816
First trial of a Davy lamp at Hebburn Colliery.
1816
Davy awarded the Rumford Medal and £1,000 (equivalent to £84,283 in 2025) by the Royal Society, a £2,000 service of plate (equivalent to £168,566 in 2025) prize by the country's colliery owners.
1816
Colliery owners also award 100 guineas (equivalent to £8,850 in 2025) to Stephenson.
1816
Clanny was awarded a medal by the Royal Society of Arts in 1816.
1816
Newcastle committee opens a subscription to correct the perceived injustice of the Royal Society awards. £1,000 (equivalent to £84,283 in 2025) awarded to Stephenson.
1818
Davy lamps reported to be in use in Flanders.
5 August 1818
Wallsend colliery explosion, four killed. Caused by a Davy lamp (gauze damaged in fall)
1840
Mathieu-Louis Mueseler exhibited his lamp in Belgium.
1843
The South Shields Committee concludes that "no mere Safety Lamp, however ingenious its construction, is able to secure fiery mines from explosion, and that a reliance upon it is a fatal error " and that "the naked Davy lamp, without a complete shield of glass or other material, is a most dangerous instrument, and has indubitably been productive of those accidents in mines against which it is too confidently and generally employed".
1852
House of Commons Select Committee on Accidents in Coal Mines warns that "the Davy lamp, or any modification of it, must be considered rather as a lure to danger than as a perfect security"
1853
Nicholas Wood, President of the North of England Institute of Mining and Mechanical Engineers, presents the results of experiments on various lamps which concluded that the Davy was safe, but only had a small "margin of danger".
8 December 1856
Explosion at Nicholson's Pit, Rainton Colliery. One man died from his injuries 12 days after the explosion. Firedamp was ignited when being tested for with a Clanny lamp having a cracked glass. The inspector condemns the Clanny and recommends the Stephenson for light and the Davy for testing.
1859
William Clark – first patent for electrical lamp. Electric lamps first used in 1860s.
1872
Coal Mines Regulation Act required locked lamps under certain circumstances.
1881
Joseph Swan exhibited his first electric lamp.
16 February 1882
Trimdon Grange colliery disaster, 69 men and boys killed. The coroner reporting to the House of Commons adjudged that: "the result of this inquiry is a further proof, if further proof were needed, that the Davy lamp affords no security whatever ... and that its employment ... ought to be absolutely prohibited".
1886
Royal Commission on Accidents in Mines tested lamps and made recommendations.
1887
Coal Mines Regulation Act made requirements on construction, examination and use.
1900
Electric lighting in mines.
1911
Coal Mines Act made requirements on examination and use, including electric lamps.
1911
British Government offers prize for best electrical lamp.
1919
Miners Lamp Committee set up to study safety lamps, reporting five years later.
1924
Miners Lamp Committee reported and made recommendations, after carrying out tests.
1930
Battery-powered helmet lamps.

=== Examples of lamps ===
==== Davy lamp ====
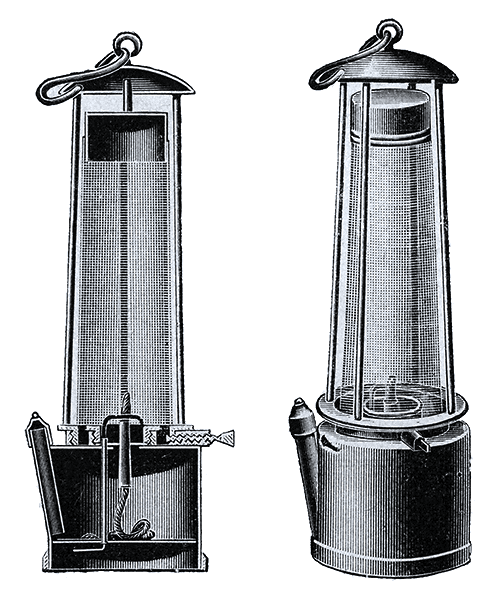
A Davy lamp

In the Davy lamp a standard oil lamp is surrounded by fine wire mesh or gauze, the top being closed by a double layer of gauze.

If firedamp is drawn into the flame it will burn more brightly and if the proportions are correct may even detonate. The flame on reaching the gauze fails to pass through and so the mine atmosphere is not ignited. However, if the flame is allowed to play on the gauze for a significant period, then it will heat up, sometimes as far as red heat. At this point it is effective, but in a dangerous state. Any further increase in temperature to white heat will ignite the external atmosphere. A sudden draught will case a localised hot spot and the flame will pass through. At a draught of between 4 and 6 feet per second the lamp becomes unsafe. At Wallsend in 1818 lamps were burning red hot (indicating significant firedamp). A boy (Thomas Elliott) was employed to carry hot lamps to the fresh air and bring cool lamps back. For some reason he stumbled; the gauze was damaged and the damaged lamp triggered the explosion. At Trimdon Grange (1882) a roof fall caused a sudden blast of air and the flame passed through the gauze with fatal results (69 killed).

Poor copies and ill-advised "improvements" were known, but changing dimensions either reduced the illumination or the safety. The poor light compared to either the Geordie or Clanny eventually led to the Davy being regarded as "not a lamp but a scientific instrument for detecting the presence of firedamp". Some pits continued to use candles for illumination, relying on the Davy to warn men when to extinguish them.

==== Stephenson ("Geordie") lamp ====
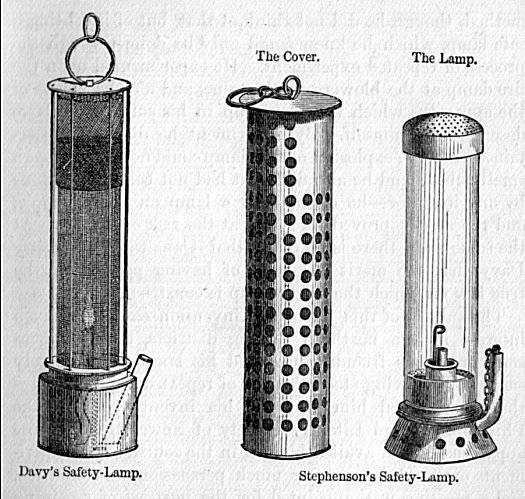
Early form of Stephenson lamp shown with a Davy lamp on the left

In the earlier Geordie lamps an oil lamp is surrounded by glass. The top of the glass has a perforated copper cap with a metal gauze screen above that. The glass is surrounded by a perforated metal tube to protect it. Air ingress was via a series of tubes at the base.

Later versions used a metal gauze, instead of the perforated metal tube, to surround and protect the glass. Air intake was via an annular chamber around the base of the lamp (instead of previous tubes) into which air entered through small (1/20") holes then passed through gauze into the lamp. If the glass surrounding the lamp was broken, the Geordie became a Davy.

A strong enough current of air could travel through the tubes (later holes and gallery) and enlarge the flame, eventually leading to it becoming red-hot. The lamp becomes unsafe in a current of from 8 to 12 feet per second, about twice that of the Davy.

==== Purdy lamp ====
A development of the Geordie lamp was the Purdy. A galley with wire gauze provided the inlet, above the glass was a chimney with perforated copper cap and gauze outer. A brass tube protected the upper works, shielded them and kept them locked in position. A sprung pin locked the whole together. The pin could only be released by applying a vacuum to a captive hollow screw; not something that a nicotine starved miner could do at the coal face.

==== Improved Clanny lamp ====
Clanny abandoned his pumps and candles and developed a safety lamp which combined features of both the Davy and Geordie. The oil lamp was surrounded by a glass chimney with no ventilation from below. Above the chimney is a wire gauze cylinder with a double top. Air enters from the side and spent gases exit from the top. In the presence of firedamp the flame intensifies. The flame must be kept fairly high in normal use, a small flame permits the enclosed space to fill with firedamp/air mixture and the subsequent detonation may pass through the gauze. A larger flame will keep the upper part full of burnt gas. The Clanny gives more light than the Davy and can be carried more easily in a draught. Lupton notes however it is superior in no other respect, particularly as a test instrument.

The glass on a Clanny was secured by a large diameter brass ring which could be hard to tighten securely. If a splinter occurred at the end of a crack, or indeed any other unevenness, then the seal might be compromised. Such an incident occurred at Nicholson Pit in 1856 on a lamp being used by an overman to test for firedamp. The mines inspector recommended that only Stephenson lamps were used for illumination and Davys for testing. In particular "overmen ... whose lamps are mostly used to detect the presence gas [sic], should avoid such [Clanny] lamps".

==== Mueseler lamp ====
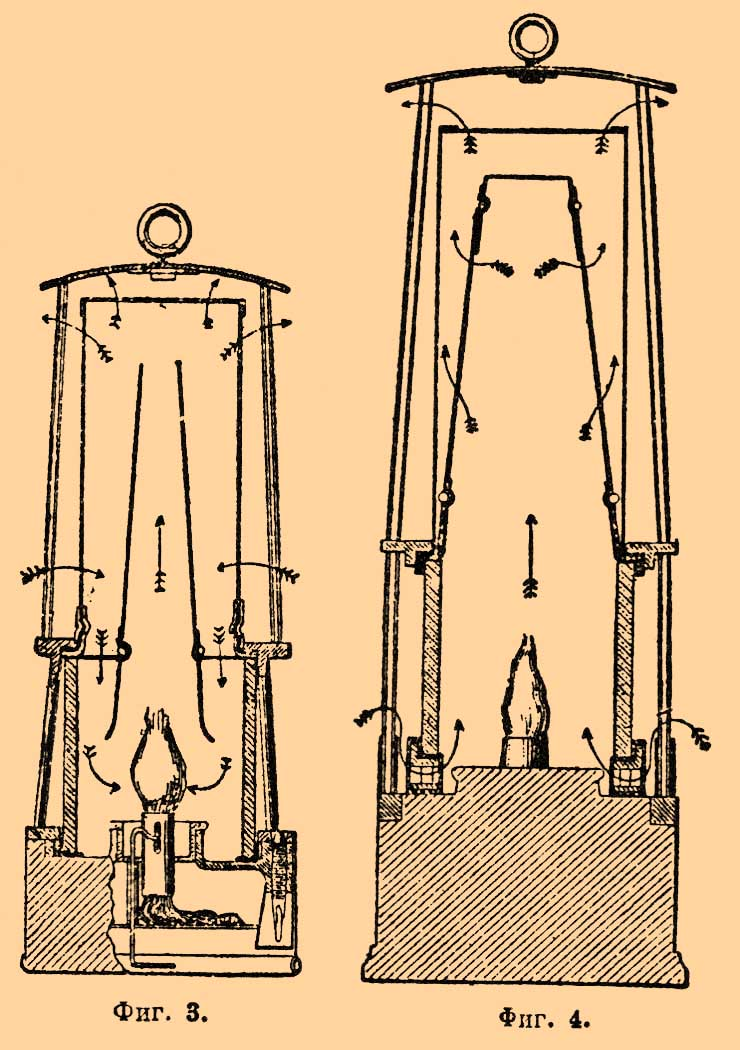
Mueseler lamp (on the left) and a derivative of the Geordie

The lamp is a modified Clanny designed by the Belgian Mathieu-Louis Mueseler. The flame is surrounded by a glass tube surmounted by a wire gauze-capped cylinder. Air enters from the side above the glass and flows down to the flame before rising to exit at the top of the lamp. So far this is just a Clanny, but there is an internal chimney separating the rising combustion products from the incoming air. The chimney is supported by a gauze shelf through which incoming air must pass, forming a second barrier to back-propagating flames. Some Mueseler lamps were fitted with a mechanism which locked the base of the lamp. Turning down the wick eventually released the base, but by then the flame was extinguished and therefore safe.

The lamp was patented in 1840, and in 1864 the Belgian government made this type of lamp compulsory.

In the presence of firedamp the explosive mixture is drawn through two gauzes (cylinder and shelf), burnt and then within the chimney are only burnt gases, not explosive mixture. Like a Clanny, and the Davy before it, it acts as an indicator of firedamp, burning more brightly in its presence. Later models had graduated shields by which the deputy could determine the concentration of firedamp from the heightening of the flame. Whilst the Clanny will continue to burn if laid on its side, potentially cracking the glass; the Mueseler will extinguish itself due to the stoppage of convection currents. The lamp is safe in currents up to 15 feet per second.

==== Marsaut lamp ====
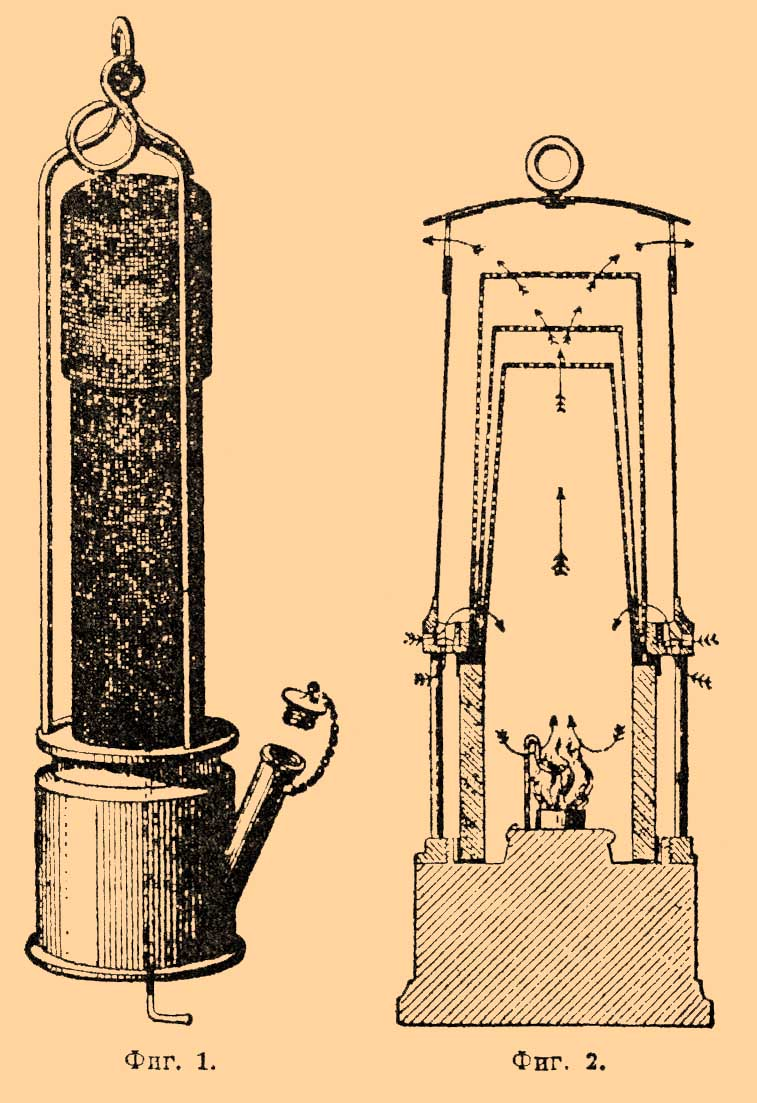
Marsaut lamp (on the right) showing a triple mesh variant

The Marsaut lamp is a Clanny with multiple gauzes. Two or three gauzes are fitted inside each other, which improves the safety in a draught. Multiple gauzes, however, interfere with the air flow. The Marsaut was one of the first lamps to be fitted with a shield, in the illustration (right) the bonnet can be seen surrounding the gauzes. A shielded Marsaut lamp can resist a current of 30 feet per second.

==== Bainbridge lamp ====
The Bainbridge is a development of the Stephenson. A tapered glass cylinder surrounds the flame, and above that the body is a brass tube. The top of the tube is closed by a horizontal mesh attached to the body of the lamp by small bars to conduct heat away. Air enters through a series of small holes drilled in the lower brass ring supporting the glass.

==== Landau's lamp ====
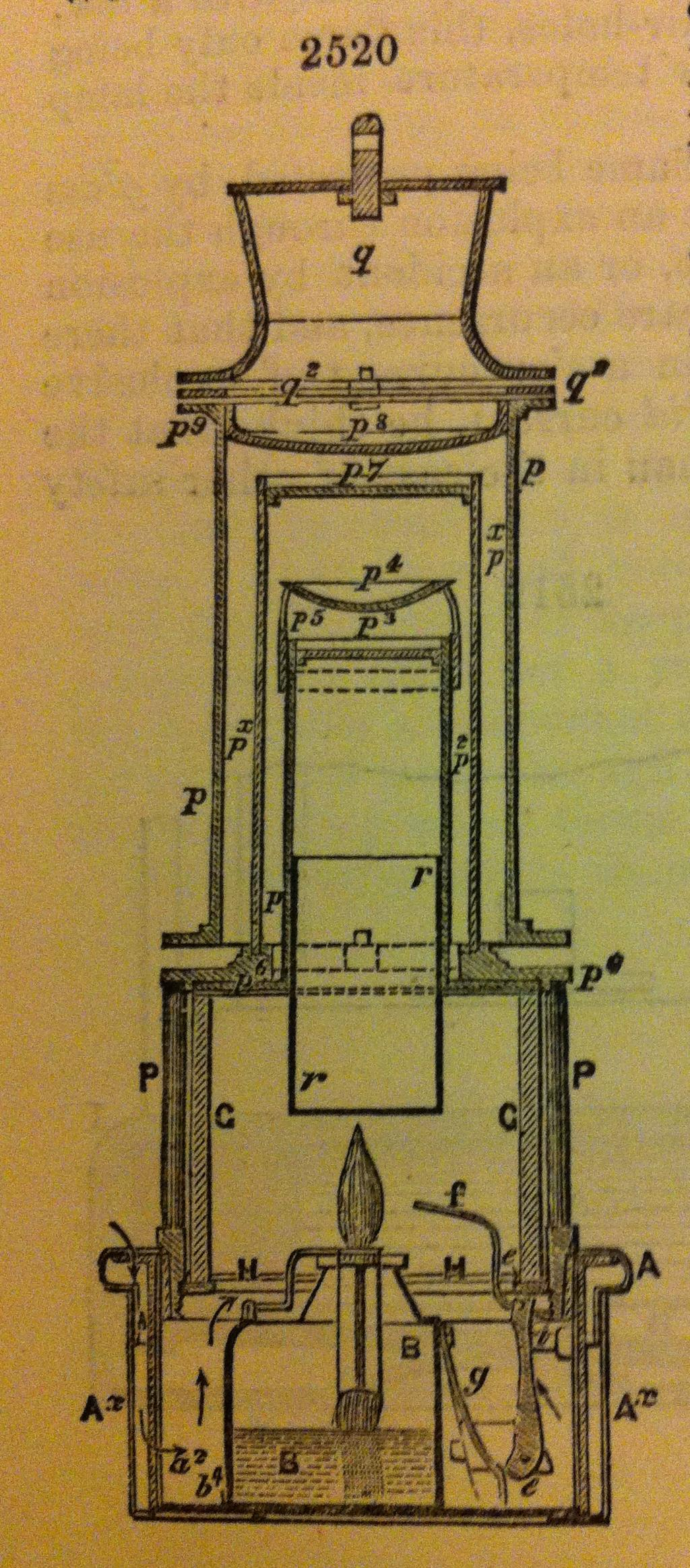
Miner's safety lamp designed by Landau prior to 1878. Published in Dr Ure's Dictionary supplement of 1879

The lamp is in part a development of the Geordie. Air enters into a ring near the base which is protected by wire gauze or a perforated plate. The air passes down the side of the lamp passing through a series of gauze-covered holes, and enters the base through another yet another series of gauze-covered holes. Any attempt to unscrew the base causes the lever (shown at f in the illustration) to extinguish the flame. The gauze-covered holes and passageways restrict the flow to that required for combustion, so if any part of the oxygen is replaced by firedamp, then the flame is extinguished for want of oxidant.

The upper portion of the lamp uses a chimney like in Mueseler and Morgan lamps. The rising gases pass up the chimney and through a gauze. At the top of the chimney a dished reflector diverts the gases out sideways through a number of holes in the chimney. The gases then start to rise up the intermediate chimney before exiting through another gauze. Gas finally passes down between the outermost chimney and the intermediate chimney, exiting a little above the glass. The outer chimney is therefore effectively a shield.

==== Yates' lamp ====
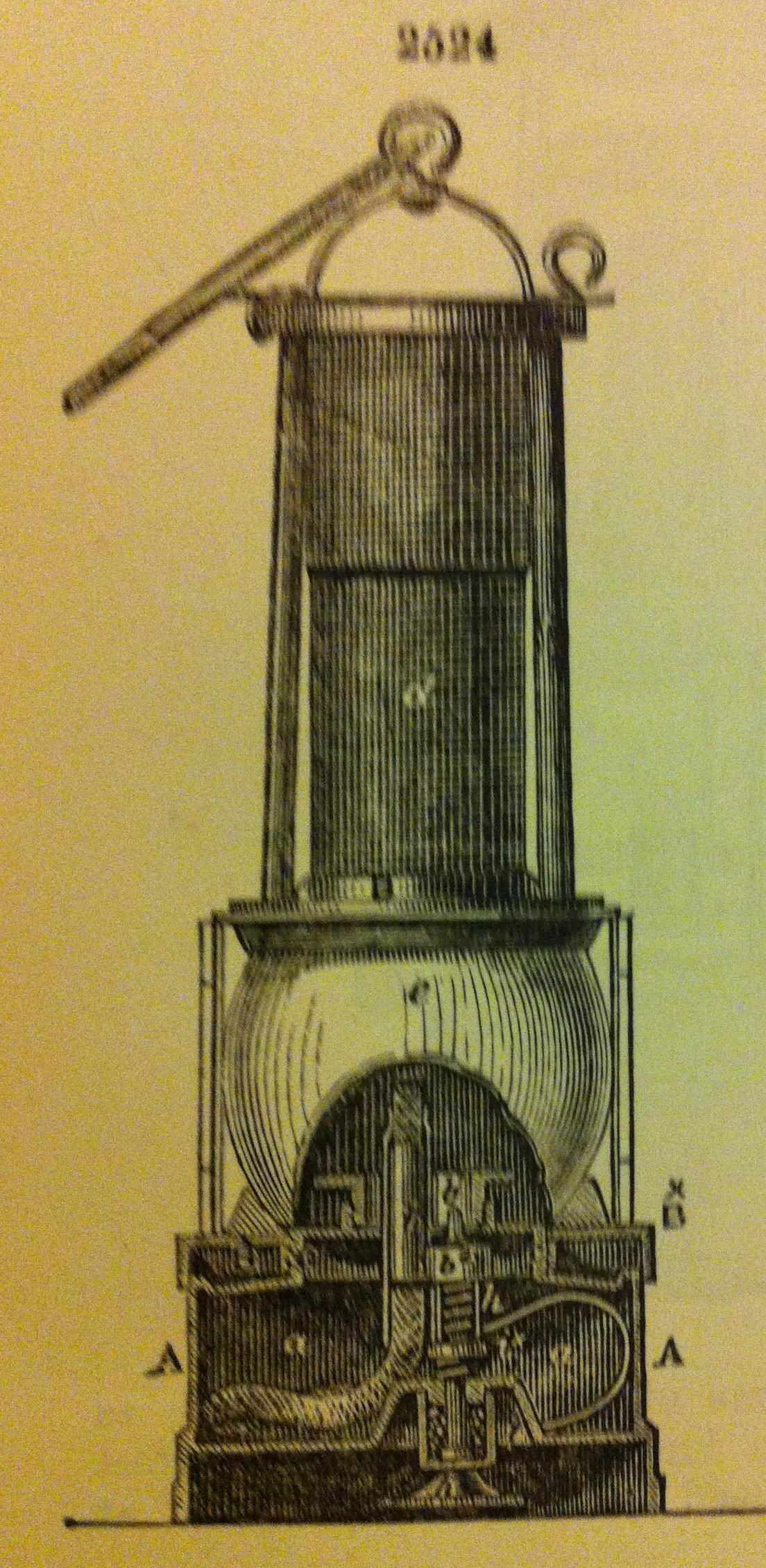
Miner's safety lamp designed by Mr William Yates c. 1878, published in Dr Ure's Dictionary supplement of 1879

The Yates lamp is a development of the Clanny. Air enters through the lower part of the gauze top and leaves through the upper part; there is no chimney. The lower glass part of the lamp has seen some development however. It is replaced by a silvered reflector having a strong lens or bull's-eye in it to allow the light out. The result was a claimed 20 fold improvement in lighting over the Davy. Yates claimed "the temptation to expose the flame to obtain more light is removed".

The base also contained an interlocking mechanism to ensure that the wick was lowered and the lamp extinguished by any attempt to open it.

The lamp was "much more expensive than the forms of lamp now in general use, but Mr, Yates states that the saving of oil effected by its use will in one year pay the additional cost".

==== Evan Thomas ====
The lamp devised and manufactured by Evan Thomas of Aberdare is similar to a shielded Clanny, but there is a brass cylinder outside the gauze above the glass. It resists draughts well, but illumination is poor.

==== Morgan ====
The Morgan is a cross between the Mueseler and the Marsaut. It is a shielded lamp with a series of disks at the top to allow spent fumes out and a series of holes lower down the shield to allow air in. There is an inner and outer shield so that air cannot blow directly on the wire gauze but must first find its way through a slim chamber. There are multiple gauzes, like the Mersaut, and there is an internal chimney like the Mueseler. There is no "shelf" supporting the chimney, instead it hangs from an inverted gauze cone.

The Morgan will resist air up to 53 feet per second and is "sufficiently safe for every practical purpose".

==== Clifford ====
The Clifford also has a double shield, but with a plain flat top. The chimney is quite narrow with wire gauze covering the top. The bottom of the chimney has a glass bell covering the flame. The chimney is supported on a gauze shelf. Air enters through the lower part of the outer shield, through the passage and into the lamp through the inner shield. It is drawn down through the gauze, then passes the flame and ascends the chimney. At the top it leaves through gauze and the top of the double shield. The inner chimney is made of copper coated with a fusible metal: if the lamp gets too hot the metal melts and closes the air holes, extinguishing the lamp.

The lamp has been tested and according to Lupton "successfully resisted every effort to explode it up to a velocity of more than 100 feet per second".

== Electric lamps ==
It was not until tungsten filaments replaced carbon that a portable electric light became a reality. An early pioneer was Joseph Swan who exhibited his first lamp in Newcastle upon Tyne in 1881 and improved ones in subsequent years. The Royal Commission on Accidents in Mines set up in 1881 carried out extensive tests of all types of lamps and the final report in 1886 noted that there had been good progress made in producing electric lamps giving a light superior to that of oil lamps and expected economic and efficient lamps to become available soon. This turned out not to be the case and progress was slow in attaining reliability and economy. The Sussmann lamp was introduced into Britain in 1893 and following trials at Murton Colliery in Durham it became a widely used electric lamp with 3000 or so reported by the company in use in 1900 However, by 1910 there were only 2055 electric lamps of all types in use – about 0.25% of all safety lamps. In 1911, an anonymous colliery owner, through the British government, offered a prize of £1000 (equivalent to £102,000 in 2025) for the best lamp to specified requirements. There were 195 entries. It was won by a German engineer with the CEAG lamp, which was hand-held and delivered twice the illumination of oil lamps, with a battery life of 16 hours. Awards were made to 8 other lamps that met the judges' criteria. Clearly this stimulated development and over the next few years there was a marked increase in the use of electric lamps, especially the CEAG, Gray-Sussmann, and Oldham, so by 1922 there were 294,593 in use in Britain.

In 1913, Thomas Edison won the Ratheman medal for inventing a lightweight storage battery that could be carried on the back, powering a parabolic reflector that could be mounted on the miner's helmet. After extensive testing, 70,000 robust designs were in use in the US by 1916.

Early electric lamps in Britain were hand-held as miners were used to this and helmet lamps became common much later than in countries like the US where helmet (cap) lamps had been the norm.

Nowadays, safety lamps are mainly electric, and traditionally mounted on miners' helmets (such as the Wheat lamp or the Oldham headlamp), sealed to prevent gas penetrating the casing where it might be ignited by an electrical spark.

Although its use as a light source was superseded by electric lighting, the flame safety lamp has continued to be used in mines to detect methane and blackdamp, although many modern mines now use sophisticated electronic gas detectors for this purpose.

A newer light source, the light-emitting diode (LED), has advantages for safety lamps, mainly higher efficiency providing much longer illumination time from the same battery. Batteries too have improved and provide more energy per unit weight; LEDs in conjunction with batteries such as rechargeable lithium units provide much better performance in safety lamp applications.

The Office of Mine Safety and Health (OMSHR), a part of the National Institute for Occupational Safety and Health (NIOSH) (itself part of Centers for Disease Control and Prevention) in the United States has been investigating the benefits of LED headlamps. A problem in mining is that the average age of miners is increasing (43.3 years in the US in 2013), and vision deteriorates with ages. LED technology is physically robust compared to a filament light bulb, and has a longer life: 50,000 hours compared to 1,000 – 3,000. Extended life reduces light maintenance and failures; according to OMSHR an average of 28 accidents per year occur in US mines involving lighting. NIOSH has sponsored the development of cap lamp systems which they say improve the "ability of older subjects to detect moving hazards by 15% and trip hazards by 23.7%, and discomfort glare was reduced by 45%". Conventional lights illuminate a narrow beam; NIOSH LED lamps are designed to produce a wider more diffuse beam which is claimed to improve the perception of objects by 79.5%.

== See also ==
- Canaries as sentinels in coal mines
- Headlamp (outdoor)
- List of light sources
- Pellistor
- Wheat lamp

== Bibliography ==
- A Looker On (1844), "Improper lamps and other lights in coal mines", Tracts, vol. 214, The North of England Institute of Mining and Mechanical Engineers, pp. 3–4, archived from the original on 19 August 2011 The real author may be Thomas Unthank (NEIMME website).
- Brune, Jürgen F (2010), Extracting the Science: A Century of Mining Research, Society for Mining, Metallurgy and Exploration, Inc, ISBN 978-0873353229
- Calvin, Ronnie (2000), "Coal", in Cameron, Alastair (ed.), Lakeland's Mining Heritage, Cumbria Amenity Trust Mining History Society, ISBN 0-9539477-0-X
- Cayley, Edward Stillingfleet (Chair) (1852), Report from the Select Committee on Coal Mines, together with the Proceedings of the Committee, Minutes of Evidence, Appendix and Index, London: by order of the House of Commons
- Clanny, W. R. (1813), "On the Means of Procuring a Steady Light in Coal Mines without the Danger of Explosion", Philosophical Transactions of the Royal Society of London, 103: 200–205, doi:10.1098/rstl.1813.0027, S2CID 110192619
- Clanny, M.D., W. Reid (January–June 1816), "An Account of a trial of Dr. Reid Clanny's Lamp in some of the Newcastle Coal-Mines", Annals of Philosophy, VII: 368–373
- Clanny, M.D., William Reid (July–December 1816), "Practical Observations on Safety Lamps for Coal Mines", Annals of Philosophy, VIII: 353–357
- Clark, Neale R (2001), "Mine Safety Lamp Collection on Display at the National Mine Health and Safety Academy" (PDF), Holmes Safety Association Bulletin (January 2001), archived from the original (PDF) on 7 August 2020 Publishers note: Portions of the article came from E. Thomas & Williams (see below).
- Davies, Hunter (2004), George Stephenson, The History Press, ISBN 978-0-7509-3795-5
- Dron, R.W. (1924), Mining Association of Great Britain (ed.), "Lighting of mines", Historical Review of Coal Mining, London: Fleetway Press: 150–169
- Durham Mining Museum (2012), Mill Pit, Herrington
- Durham Mining Museum (2012a), Wallsend colliery
- Durham Mining Museum (2014), In Memoriam: Robert Johnson
- E. Thomas & Williams Ltd, The History of Miner Lamps, Welshminerslamps.com
- Fordyce, William (1973), A History of Coal, Coke and Coal Fields and the Manufacture of Iron in the North of England, Graham, ISBN 9780902833999
- Forster, G. (1914), Safety lamps and the detection of fire-damp in mines, London: George Routledge
- Geopedia.fr (2011), Mining lamp catalog, Geopedia.fr, archived from the original on 9 February 2012
- Gresko, Dave (2012), Brief History of the Miner's Flame Safety Lamp, Minerslamps.net, archived from the original on 26 August 2003
- Hoffman, Frederick L. (1916), Miners' Nystagmus, Washington, DC: Department of the Interior, Bureau of Mines
- Home Office (1901), Mines and quarries: general report and statistics for 1900. Part II Labour, Cd.766, London: HMSO
- Hunt, Robert, ed. (1879), Dr Ure's Dictionary of Arts, Manufactures, and Mines, vol. IV (Supplement), London: Longmans, Green and Co.
- Ingham, Robert (President) (1843), The Report of the South Shields Committee, appointed to investigate the causes of Accidents in Coal Mines, London: Longman, Brown, Green, & Longmans
- Johnson, Frank (2014), A brief survey of the development and manufacture of miners safety lamps (PDF), The Protector Lamp & Lighting Co Ltd
- Jones, A.V.; Tarkenter, R.P. (1993), Electrical technology in mining: the dawn of a new age, London: Peter Peregrinus
- Knight, David (1992), "8: The Safety Lamp", Humphry Davy: Science and Power, Cambridge University Press, ISBN 0-631-16816-8
- Lowther, Sir James, Bart. (1 January 1733), "An Account of the Damp Air in a Coal-Pit of Sir James Lowther, Bart. Sunk within 20 Yards of the Sea; Communicated by Him to the Royal Society", Philosophical Transactions, 38 (429): 109–113, Bibcode:1733RSPT...38..109L, doi:10.1098/rstl.1733.0019, JSTOR 103830, S2CID 186210832
- Lupton, Arnold (1893), Mining, an elementary treatise on the getting of minerals, Ch. 11: Safety Lamps, Chapter 11
- Metcalfe, Peter; Metcalfe, Roger (1999), Engineering Studies, Year 11, NSW Engineering Studies
- NEIMME, List of descriptions of safety lamps held by the institution
- New Wisdom Investment Limited (2007), History mineral lamp, archived from the original on 21 February 2020
- New Wisdom Investment Limited (2008), LED Light Unit Li-ion battery miner's Lamp, archived from the original on 20 February 2020
- Office of Mine Safety and Health (10 April 2013), Mining Feature: NIOSH Illumination Research Addresses Visual Performance Needs with LED Technology
- Paris, John Ayrton (1831), The Life of Sir Humphry Davy, Late President of the Royal Society, Foreign Associate of the Royal Institute of France ...: In 2 volumes, vol. II, Colburn & Bentley
- Purdy, William (1880), An Essay on Colliery Explosions and Safety Lamps, London: Colliery Guardian
- Royal Commission on Accidents in Mines (1886), Final report Command paper 4699
- Smiles, Samuel (1862), Lives of the Engineers, vol. III (George and Robert Stephenson), London: John Murray, ISBN 0-7153-4281-9 (ISBN refers to the David & Charles reprint of 1968 with an introduction by L. T. C. Rolt)
- Snagge, T. W. (1882), Report on the Explosion which occurred at the Trimdon Grange Colliery on the 16th February 1882
- Swan, J.W. (1881), "Swan's electric light", Transactions, 30, North of England Institute of Mining and Mechanical Engineers: 149–159
- Sykes, John (11 July 1835), An account of the dreadful explosion in Wallsend Colliery, on the 18th June, 1835, to which is added a list of explosions, inundations, &c. which have occurred in the Coal Mines of Northumberland and Durham ..., Newcastle: John Sykes (Sykes was the publisher of the Newcastle Courant)
- Thomson, Thomas, ed. (1814), Annals of Philosophy, vol. IV, Robert Baldwin
- Thomson, Thomas, ed. (July–December 1817), Annals of Philosophy, vol. X, Robert Baldwin
- Thomson, Thomas (May 1818), "Employment of Sir H. Davy's Safety-Lamps in Flanders", Annals of Philosophy, vol. XI, no. LXV, p. 394
- Trianco Corporation, Solid Brass Miners' Lamps, Page: Full Size Miners' Lamps, archived from the original on 3 June 2019
- Whitaker, J.W. (1928), Mine lighting, London: Methuen
- Wood, Nicholas (1853), "On Safety Lamps for Lighting Coal Mines", Transactions, I (1852–1853), North of England Institute of Mining and Mechanical Engineers: 301–322 (Presidential Lecture)
- Wood, Oliver (1988), "West Cumberland Coal: 1600–1982/3", Cumberland & Westmorland Antiquarian & Archaeological Society Extra Series, Kendal: Wilson, ISBN 9780950077956
- Wood, W.O. (1901), "The Sussmann Electric Miners' Lamp", Transactions of the Institution of Mining Engineers, XXI (1900–1901): 189–197 – via Internet Archive

== External links and abbreviations ==
- DMM: Durham Mining Museum
- Miners Lamp Collectors Society
- NEIMME: The North of England Institute of Mining and Mechanical Engineers
- Wand of Science "The website resource for miners safety lamp collectors! If I don't know it I probably know a man who does!!"
- "Safety-Lamp" . Encyclopædia Britannica (11th ed.). 1911.
