= Davy lamp =

Safety lamp that prevents open flames from igniting flammable gases

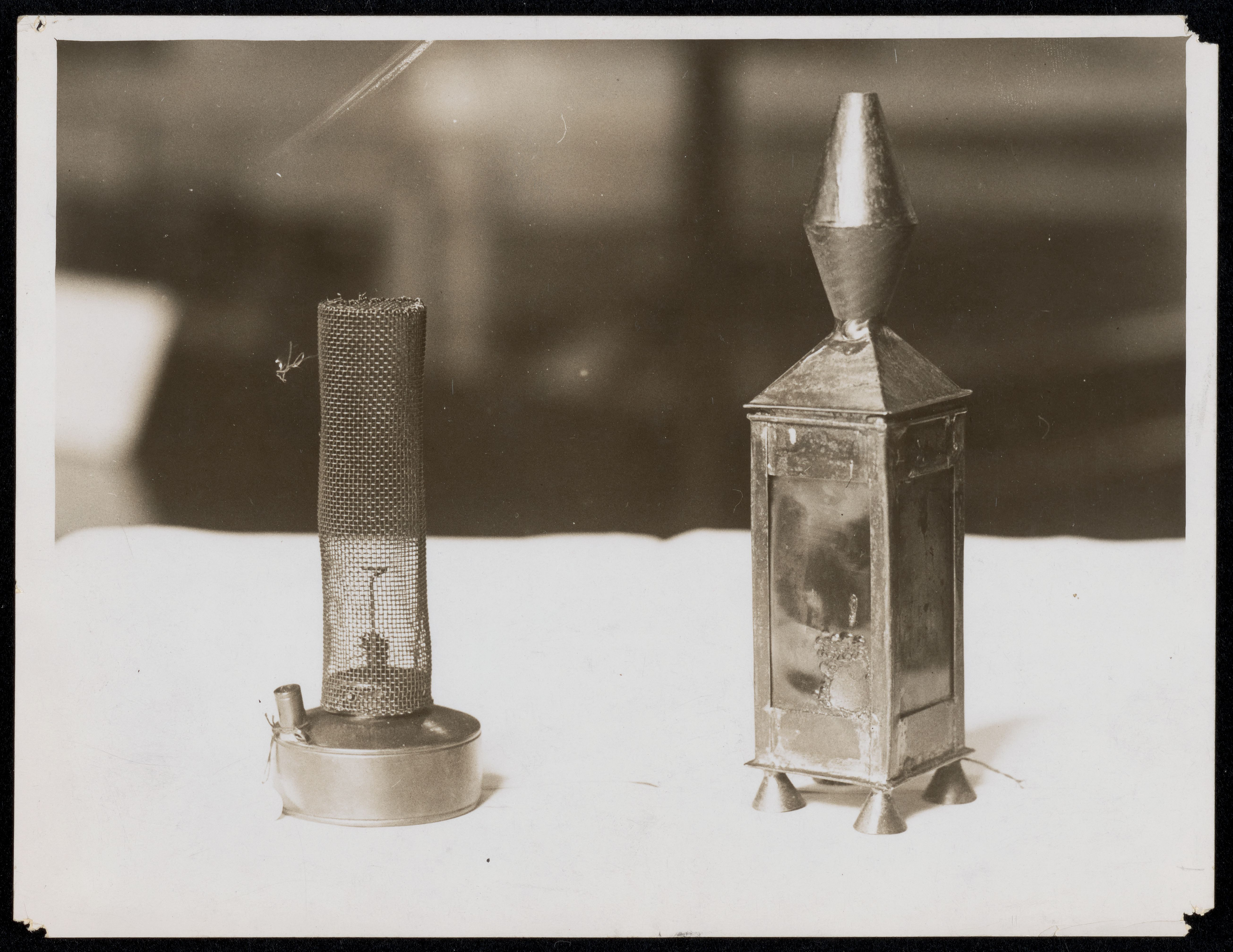
Davy's first safety lantern, 1815 (at left)

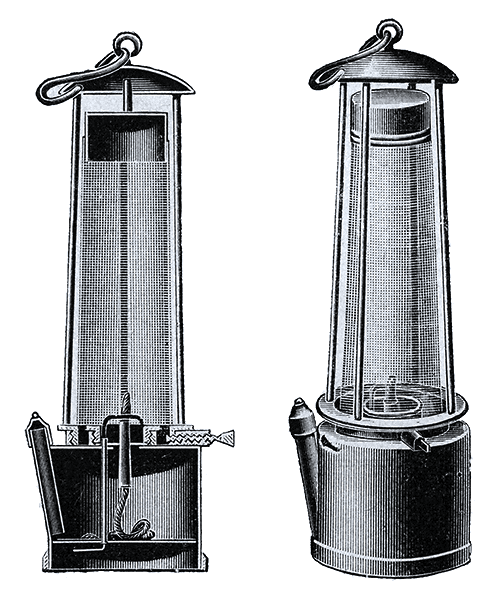
Diagram of a Davy lamp

The Davy lamp is a safety lamp used in flammable atmospheres, invented in 1815 by Sir Humphry Davy. It consists of a wick lamp with the flame enclosed inside a mesh screen. It was created for use in coal mines, to reduce the danger of explosions due to the presence of methane and other flammable gases, called firedamp or minedamp.

== History ==
German polymath Alexander von Humboldt, working for the German Bureau of Mines, had concerns for the health and welfare of the miners and invented a kind of respirator and "four lamps of different construction suitable for employment in various circumstances. The respirator was to prevent the inhaling of injurious gases, and to supply the miner with good air; the lamps were constructed to burn in the most inflammable kind of fire-damp without igniting the gas. They were the forerunners of Davy's later invention, and were frequently made use of by the miners."

Davy's invention was preceded by that of William Reid Clanny, an Irish doctor at Bishopwearmouth, who had read a paper to the Royal Society in May 1813. The more cumbersome Clanny safety lamp was successfully tested at Herrington Mill, and he won medals, from the Royal Society of Arts.

Despite his lack of scientific knowledge, engine-wright George Stephenson devised a lamp in which the air entered via tiny holes, through which the flames of the lamp could not pass. A month before Davy presented his design to the Royal Society, Stephenson demonstrated his own lamp to two witnesses by taking it down Killingworth Colliery and holding it in front of a fissure from which firedamp was issuing.

The first trial of a Davy lamp with a wire sieve was at Hebburn Colliery on 9 January 1816. A letter from Davy (which he intended to be kept private) describing his findings and various suggestions for a safety lamp was made public at a meeting in Newcastle on 3 November 1815, and a paper describing the lamp was formally presented at a Royal Society meeting in London on 9 November. For it, Davy was awarded the society's Rumford Medal. Davy's lamp differed from Stephenson's in that the flame was surrounded by a screen of gauze, whereas Stephenson's prototype lamp had a perforated plate contained in a glass cylinder (a design mentioned in Davy's Royal Society paper as an alternative to his preferred solution). For his invention Davy was given £2,000 worth of silver (the money being raised by public subscription), whilst Stephenson was accused of stealing the idea from Davy, because the fully developed 'Geordie lamp' had not been demonstrated by Stephenson until after Davy had presented his paper at the Royal Society, and (it was held) previous versions had not actually been safe. (Note: The mean maximum quenching diameter (the maximum hole diameter through which a flame, but not an explosion, will not pass) for drilled holes in 1/32" thick brass plate was reported in 1968 to be 0.139 inches for methane/air mixtures. Davy's letter read at the 3 November meeting in Newcastle reported that his work on samples of firedamp had shown that explosions in flammable mixtures of firedamp with air would not pass through tubes of diameter less than 1/8". Stephenson's first lamp had a 1/2" air inlet, throttled by a slider, the second three air inlets of internal diameter 3/22" (0.136") but distorted by bending at the tip to give an oval, long diameter 1/5", short diameter 1/14", in his third lamp, air ingress was through brass plates with holes of various sizes, the largest about 1/12" diameter.)

A local committee of enquiry gathered in support of Stephenson exonerated him, showing that he had been working separately to create the Geordie lamp, and raised a subscription for him of £1,000. Davy and his supporters refused to accept their findings, and would not see how an uneducated man such as Stephenson could come up with the solution he had: Stephenson himself freely admitted that he had arrived at a practical solution on the basis of an erroneous theory. In 1833, a House of Commons committee found that Stephenson had equal claim to having invented the safety lamp. Davy went to his grave claiming that Stephenson had stolen his idea. The Stephenson lamp was used almost exclusively in North East England, whereas the Davy lamp was used everywhere else. The experience gave Stephenson a lifelong distrust of London-based, theoretical, scientific experts. (Note: In his book 'George and Robert Stephenson,' the author L.T.C. Rolt relates that opinion varied about the two lamps efficiency; that the Davy Lamp gave more light, but the Geordie Lamp was thought to be safer in a more gaseous atmosphere. He follows Smiles(1857) in referring to an incident in 1857 at Oaks Colliery in Barnsley where both lamps were in use. Following a sudden strong influx of gas the tops of all the Davy Lamps became red hot (which had in the past caused an explosion, and in so doing risked another), whilst all the Geordie Lamps simply went out.)

== Design and theory ==
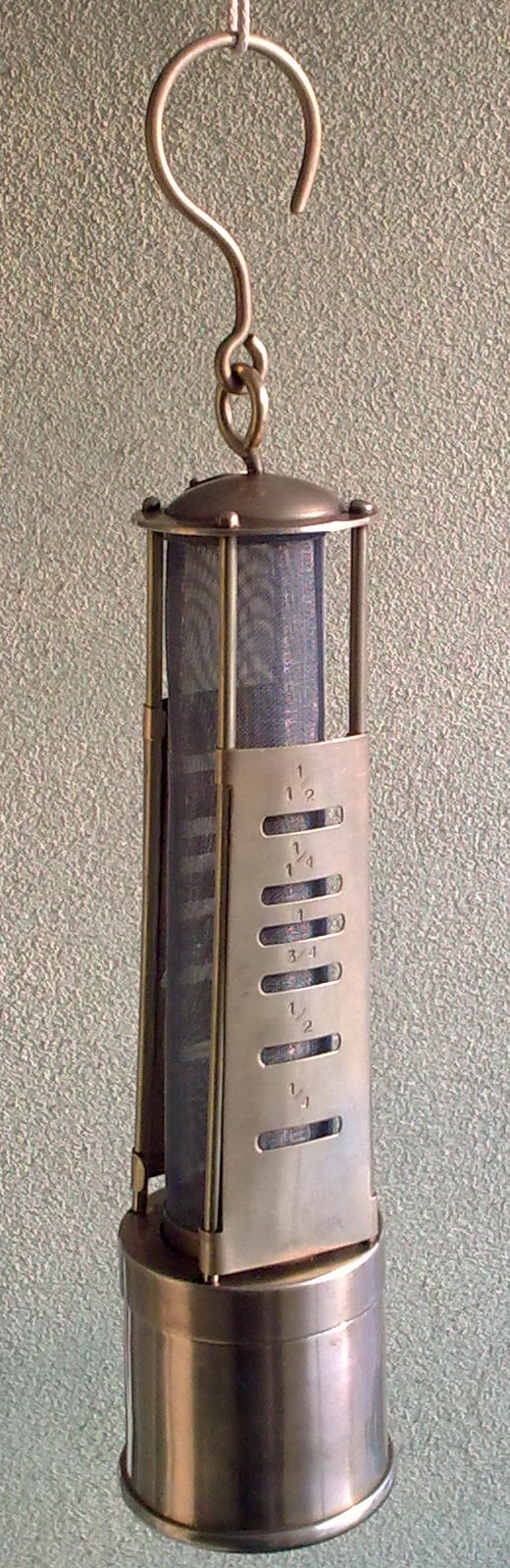
A type of Davy lamp with apertures for gauging flame height

The lamp consists of a wick lamp with the flame enclosed inside a mesh screen. The screen acts as a flame arrestor; air (and any firedamp present) can pass through the mesh freely enough to support combustion, but the holes are too fine to allow a flame to propagate through them and ignite any firedamp outside the mesh. The Davy lamp was fueled by oil or naphtha (lighter fluid).

The lamp also provided a test for the presence of gases. If flammable gas mixtures were present, the flame of the Davy lamp burned higher with a blue tinge. Lamps were equipped with a metal gauge to measure the height of the flame. Miners could place the safety lamp close to the ground to detect gases, such as carbon dioxide, that are denser than air and so could collect in depressions in the mine; if the mine air was oxygen-poor (asphyxiant gas), the lamp flame would be extinguished (black damp or chokedamp). A methane-air flame is extinguished at about 17% oxygen content (which will still support life), so the lamp gave an early indication of an unhealthy atmosphere, allowing the miners to get out before they died of asphyxiation.

== Impact ==
In 1816, the Cumberland Pacquet reported a demonstration of the Davy lamp at William Pit, Whitehaven. Placed in a blower "... the effect was grand beyond description. At first a blue flame was seen to cap the flame of the lamp, – then succeeded a lambent flame, playing in the cylinder; and shortly after, the flame of the firedamp expanded, so as to completely fill the wire gauze. For some time, the flame of the lamp was seen through that of the firedamp, which became ultimately extinguished without explosion. Results more satisfactory were not to be wished..." Another correspondent to the paper commented "The Lamp offers absolute security to the miner... With the excellent ventilation of the Whitehaven Collieries and the application of Sir HUMPHRY's valuable instrument, the accidents from the explosion of [carbureted] hydrogene which have occurred (although comparatively few for such extensive works) will by this happy invention be avoided".

However, this prediction was not fulfilled: in the next thirty years, firedamp explosions in Whitehaven pits killed 137 people. More generally, the Select Committee on Accidents in Mines reported in 1835 that the introduction of the Davy lamp had led to an increase in mine accidents; the lamp encouraged the working of mines and parts of mines that had previously been closed for safety reasons. For example, in 1835, 102 men and boys were killed by a firedamp explosion in a Wallsend colliery working the Bensham seam, described at the subsequent inquest by John Buddle as "a dangerous seam, which required the utmost care in keeping in a working state", which could only be worked with the Davy lamp. The coroner noted that a previous firedamp explosion in 1821 had killed 52, but directed his jury that any finding on the wisdom of continuing to work the seam was outside their province.

The lamps had to be provided by the miners themselves, not the owners, as traditionally the miners had bought their own candles from the company store. Miners still preferred the better illumination from a naked light, and mine regulations insisting that only safety lamps be used were draconian in principle, but in practice neither observed nor enforced. After two accidents in two years (1838–39) in Cumberland pits, both caused by safety checks being carried out by the light of a naked flame, the Royal Commission on Children's Employment commented both on the failure to learn from the first accident, and on the "further absurdity" of "carrying a Davy lamp in one hand for the sake of safety, and a naked lighted candle in the other, as if for the sake of danger. Beyond this there can be no conceivable thoughtlessness and folly; and when such management is allowed in the mine of two of the most opulent coal-proprietors in the kingdom, we cease to wonder at anything that may take place in mines worked by men equally without capital and science".

Another reason for the increase in accidents was the unreliability of the lamps themselves. The bare gauze was easily damaged, and once just a single wire broke or rusted away, the lamp became unsafe. Work carried out by a scientific witness and reported by the committee showed that the Davy lamp became unsafe in airflows so low that a Davy lamp carried at normal walking pace against normal airflows in walkways was only safe if provided with a draught shield (not normally fitted), and the committee noted that accidents had happened when the lamp was "in general and careful use; no one survived to tell the tale of how these occurrences took place; conjecture supplied the want of positive knowledge most unsatisfactorily; but incidents are recorded which prove what must follow unreasonable testing of the lamp; and your Committee are constrained to believe that ignorance and a false reliance upon its merits, in cases attended with unwarrantable risks, have led to disastrous consequences" The "South Shields Committee", a body set up by a public meeting there (in response to an explosion at the St Hilda pit in 1839) to consider the prevention of accidents in mines had shown that mine ventilation in the North-East was generally deficient, with an insufficient supply of fresh air giving every opportunity for explosive mixtures of gas to accumulate. (Note: The Shields Committee argued that the local mines had had far too few shafts for the size of the underground workings (a view supported by evidence from George Stephenson, amongst others) and that the Commons Select Committee of 1835 had been misled on this point by gross over-estimates of the cost of additional shafts given them by John Buddle. The Shields Committee also argued against the practice (which it thought Parliament should legislate against for all new winnings) of sinking a single shaft and sub-dividing it by partitions ('brattices') to separate in- and out-flowing ventilation air – any explosion destroying the bratticing would destroy the ventilation of the mine and ensure the death by asphyxiation of those underground. This scenario had led to some of the deaths in the Wallsend accident of 1835: multiple shafts became a legal requirement in 1863 after the deaths of 204 miners in the Hartley Colliery disaster of 1862 where the catastrophic failure of a pump beam both destroyed the ventilation and blocked the only means of escape.) A subsequent select committee in 1852 concurred with this view; firedamp explosions could best be prevented by improving mine ventilation (by the use of steam ejectors: the committee specifically advised against fan ventilation), which had been neglected because of over-reliance on the safety of the Davy lamp.

The practice of using a Davy lamp and a candle together was not entirely absurd, however, if the Davy lamp is understood to be not only a safe light in an explosive atmosphere, but also a gauge of firedamp levels. In practice, however, the warning from the lamp was not always noticed in time, especially in the working conditions of the era.

The Mines Regulation Act 1860 therefore required coal mines to have an adequate amount of ventilation, constantly produced, to dilute and render harmless noxious gases so that work areas were – under ordinary circumstances – in a fit state to be worked (areas where a normally safe atmosphere could not be ensured were to be fenced off "as far as possible"): it also required safety lamps to be examined and securely locked by a duly authorized person before use.

Even when new and clean, illumination from the safety lamps was very poor, and the problem was not fully resolved until electric lamps became widely available in the late 19th century.

== Successors ==
A modern-day equivalent of the Davy lamp has been used in the Olympic flame torch relays. It was used in the relays for the Sydney, Athens, Turin, Beijing, Vancouver and Singapore Youth Olympic Games. It was also used for the Special Olympics Shanghai, Pan American and Central African games and for the London 2012 Summer Olympics relay.

Lamps are still made in Eccles, Greater Manchester; in Aberdare, South Wales; and in Kolkata, India.

A replica of a Davy lamp is located in front of the ticket office at the Stadium of Light (Sunderland AFC) which is built on a former coal mine.

In 2015, the bicentenary of Davy's invention, the former Bersham Colliery, in Wrexham, Wales, now a mining museum, hosted an event for members of the public to bring in their Davy lamps for identification. The National Mining Museum Scotland at Newtongrange, Scotland, also celebrated the 200th anniversary of the invention. In 2016, the Royal Institution of Great Britain, where the Davy lamp prototype is displayed, decided to have the invention 3D scanned, reverse engineered and presented to the museum visitors in a more accessible digital format via a virtual reality cabinet. At first sight it appears to be a traditional display cabinet but has a touch screen with various options for visitors to view and reference the virtual exhibits inside.
