= Wheat lamp =

Incandescent light

A wheat lamp is a type of incandescent light designed for use in underground mining, named for inventor Grant Wheat and manufactured by Koehler Lighting Products in Wilkes-Barre, Pennsylvania, United States, a region known for extensive mining activity.

A safety lamp designed for use in potentially hazardous atmospheres such as firedamp and coal dust, the lamp is mounted on the front of the miner's helmet and powered by a wet cell battery worn on the miner's belt. The average wheat lamp uses a three to five watt bulb which will typically operate for five to 16 hours depending on the amp-hour capacity of the battery and the current draw of the bulb being used.

A grain-of-wheat lamp is an unrelated, very small incandescent lamp used in medical and optical instruments, as well as for illuminating miniature railroad and similar models.
