= William Reid Clanny =

Irish physician and inventor (1776–1850)

William Reid Clanny FRSE (1776 – 10 January 1850) was an Irish medical doctor and inventor of a safety lamp.

== Life ==
Clanny was born in Bangor, County Down, Kingdom of Ireland. He trained as a physician at Edinburgh, and served as an assistant surgeon in the Royal Navy. He was present at the Battle of Copenhagen in 1801. He left the Navy and graduated in 1803 before settling for a while in Durham. He moved to Bishopwearmouth, in Sunderland, England and practised there for 45 years.

While in Durham, on 4 February 1806, he was initiated into Freemasonry at the Marquis of Granby Lodge. Then after moving to Sunderland, he joined The Sea Captain's Lodge, later to be renamed Palatine Lodge No 97. He was elected a Fellow of the Royal Society of Edinburgh in 1825, his proposers being Sir George Ballingall, Robert Kaye Greville, and Sir William Newbigging.

Clanny died on 10 January 1850 and was buried at Galleys Gill Cemetery in Sunderland. The entry in the Dictionary of National Biography states "his claim to remembrance rests on his efforts to diminish the loss of life from explosions in collieries.

== Safety lamps ==
In 1812 the Felling mine disaster and the explosion at Mill Pit in Herrington near Sunderland focussed attention on the issue of the safe provision of lighting in mines. In the same year Clanny completed his first lamp consisting of a candle in a glass surround. Below the glass was a trough containing water through which air was forced by a pair of bellows. Fumes bubbled out through another water chamber above. A paper 'On the Means of procuring a Steady Light in Coal Mines without the Danger of Explosion' was read before the Royal Society on 20 May the following year. Such early machines were large and cumbersome but Clanny ultimately succeeded in reducing the weight of the lamp to 34 ounces (964 grams).

By 1816, when Clanny published Practical observations on safety lamps for coal mines, he had experimented in person with a safety lamp at the Mill Pit in Herrington near Sunderland, (Note: "The first colliery in which a safety lamp was used was the Herrington Mill Pit, now the property of the Earl of Durham.") where there had been a serious explosive accident, with the loss of 24 lives, on 10 October 1812. Clanny won medals in 1816–17 for his invention from the Royal Society of Arts. His lamp and other improvements were ultimately recognised by his contemporaries, including northern coal owners who presented him with a purse of gold together with a silver salver at the Athenæum, Sunderland, on 3 February 1848.

George Stephenson acknowledged a debt to Clanny's researches and Humphry Davy invented his version of a lamp very soon after a visit to Sunderland in August 1815.
