= Outline of mining =

Overview of and topical guide to mining

The hammer and pick, two basic tools traditionally used in mining for breaking rock, together form a main heraldic symbol of mining and miners. It is also used to mark the location of mines on maps. In other locations, the pickaxe and shovel fill the same purpose

The following outline is provided as an overview of and topical guide to mining:

Mining – extraction of valuable minerals or other geological materials from the earth, usually (but not always) from an ore body, vein or (coal) seam. Any material that cannot be grown from agricultural processes, or created artificially in a laboratory or factory, is usually mined.

== Basic concepts ==
- Mining engineering
- Resource extraction

== Geology of mining ==
=== Basic terms ===
- Mineral
- Rock (geology), an aggregate material usually made up of a number of minerals
- Ore, rock containing a desired mineral
  - Ore genesis, the geological processes by which ore is formed and deposited
  - Ore grade, the amount of a desired mineral or metal that a quantity of ore contains
    - high grade ores are rich in the mineral desired, low-grade ores have less of the mineral desired
  - Gangue, minerals within the ore that are not desired; these are removed during ore processing
  - Vein (geology) a geological formation that often contains ore
- Overburden, the material on top of a given mineral deposit (in surface mining, it has to be removed)

=== Finding ore ===
- Prospecting
- Mineral exploration

=== Materials mined ===
Some examples of materials that are extracted from the earth by mining include:

- Base metals
  - Bauxite (Aluminium)
  - Cassiterite (Tin)
  - Chromite (Chromium)
  - Cinnabar (Mercury)
  - Cobaltite (Cobalt)
  - Coltan (Niobium and Tantalum)
  - Columbite (Niobium)
  - Copper – see List of copper ores
  - Ilmenite (Titanium)
  - Iron ore (Iron)
  - Galena (Lead)
  - Magnesite (Magnesium)
  - Malachite (Copper)
  - Molybdenite (Molybdenum)
  - Pentlandite (Nickel)
  - Pyrolusite (Manganese)
  - Scheelite (Tungsten)
  - Sphalerite (Zinc)
  - Tantalite (Tantalum)
  - Tin
  - Wolframite (Tungsten)
- Baryte (Barium)
- Beryl (Beryllium and Gemstones)
- Clay
- Construction aggregates
  - Gravel – see Gravel pit
  - Sand – see Sand mining
- Diamonds
- dolomite (ornamental stone, Magnesium)
- Fossil fuels
  - Coal – see Coal mining
  - Oil sands
  - Oil shale – see Oil shale industry and Shale oil extraction
- Gemstones
- Kaolinite
- Limestone
- Phosphorite (Phosphate)
- Precious metals
  - Gold – see Gold mining
  - Silver – see Silver mining
  - Platinum
- Potash
- Rare-earth elements
- Slate – see Slate industry
- Rock salt
- Stone – see Quarry
  - List of decorative stones
- Sulfur
- Uranium ore

== Types of mining and techniques ==
=== Surface mining ===
- Surface mining, mining conducted down into the ground, but with the sky open above
- Open-pit mining, where the overburden is removed and put in a different location, leaving a large pit at the end.
- Strip mining, where the overburden is stripped off and placed onto the area where the mineral (usually coal) has already been mined out, allowing the surface to be returned to roughly how it was before
- Mountaintop removal mining, where the overburden on a mountain is pushed off the mountain into the adjacent valley
- Quarrying
- Placer mining
- Dredging
- Hydraulic mining, using high-pressure jets of water to blast soil or hillsides apart

=== Underground mining ===
- Sub-surface mining, mining conducted underground
  - Two main types of underground mining, classified by the characteristic of the rock being mined:
    - Underground mining (hard rock)
    - Underground mining (soft rock)
  - There are three directions by which an underground mine may be conducted:
- Drift mining, mining horizontally
- Shaft mining, mining vertically
- Slope mining, mining at an inclined angle
  - Stoping is the process of extracting out the ore from underground, leaving a hole called a stope
- Room and pillar
- Longwall mining
- Retreat mining
- Fire-setting, a method used in stoping by setting fires to timber and letting the resulting collapse break up the rock

=== Other methods ===
- Borehole mining
- Box cut
- Deepsea mining
- Glory hole (petroleum production)
- Heap leaching
- In-situ leach
- Landfill mining
- Mine reclamation
- Omega Hydraulic Diggings
- Quartz reef mining

== Mining equipment ==
=== Excavation ===
==== Heavy machinery ====
- Steam shovel, used from the 19th century to the 1930s
- Power shovel, derived from the steam shovel, but using electricity instead of steam
- Excavator, derived from the steam shovel, but using hydraulics or pneumatics instead of steam
- Draglines use buckets attached to long cable lines, rather than affixed to a beam
- Bucket-wheel excavator, the largest moving land machines ever built
- Dredge

=== Blasting ===
Rock blasting

- Explosives
  - Gunpowder or black powder, used from the 17th century to the mid-19th century
  - Dynamite, used from the mid-19th century into the 20th century, still used some today
  - ANFO, used from the 20th century, and the primary explosive in use today
- Blasting gear
  - Detonator, a small explosive charge used to set off the main explosive
  - Blasting machine, a device used to generate or send an electric charge to the detonators

=== Transport ===
- Vertical equipment
  - Hoist (mining)
  - Winding engine
  - Headframe
- Equipment for transporting miners
  - Man engine
  - Mantrip

Engines used in mining

- Archimedes' screw
- Beam engine
- Drilling rig
- Loader (equipment)
- Wheel tractor-scraper

=== Liquid mining ===
- Pumpjack
- Wellhead
- Subsea

=== Safety and environment ===
- Safety lamp
- Miner's canary
- Air classifier
- Movement and Surveying Radar

== Processing ==
- Ore dressing
  - General methods of ore processing
    - Froth flotation
    - Trommel
  - Methods peculiar to gold placer mining. Gold is much denser than many other minerals, various methods use this to separate it out:
    - Gold panning, uses a pan in water to wash material
    - Rocker box
    - Sluice box
    - Drywasher, used where there is insuffician
- Extractive metallurgy
  - Pyrometallurgy, using heat
    - Smelting
    - Cupellation
  - Hydrometallurgy, using aqueous solutions
    - Leaching, using an acid (lixiviant) to remove. Commonly used for gold and copper
    - Amalgamation, using liquid mercury to extract the metal. Used to separate out silver and gold.
  - Electrometallurgy, using electricity to separate out metals

== Mining waste ==
- Spoil tip, a pile where overburden is placed (which has NOT been processed)
- Tailings, waste mineral material (gangue) leftover AFTER processing
- Slag, material left over from smelting
- Acid mine drainage, liquid leached out of mines

== Mining hazards and safety ==
- Bootleg mining
- Claustrophobia
- Deformation monitoring
- Coal mining debate
- Damp (mining)
  - After damp
  - Black damp
  - Fire damp
  - Stink damp
  - White damp
- Energy law
- Mine disaster
- Mine exploration
- Mine fire
- Mine rescue
- Mining accident
- Mining induced subsidence

== Geography of mining ==
- List of diamond mines
- List of uranium mines

=== Mining, by country ===
==== Mining of specific minerals, by country ====
- Bentonite production, by country
- Bismuth production, by country
- Feldspar production, by country
- Fluorite production, by country
- Manganese production, by country
- Mine production of gold, by country
- Uranium production, by country

== History of mining ==
- Cornish stamps
- Davy lamp
- De re metallica
- Fire-setting
- Freeminer
- Geordie lamp
- Gold rush
- History of coal mining
- Hurrying
- Hushing
- Mining innovations during the Industrial Revolution
- School of mines

=== Economics of mining ===
- List of mining companies

=== Future of mining ===
- Biomining
- Asteroid mining

== People associated with mining ==
- miner, is a person who is involved in the act of mining
- prospector, a person who is expert in searching for and assessing the value of

=== Mining scholars ===
- Georg Agricola - author of De re metallica
- Harrison Schmitt - American geologist, astronaut, retired senator
- Paul Worsey
- Richard Redmayne
- Robert Hunt (scientist)
- Ronald F. Tylecote
- Russell Walter Fox
- Frank T. M. White

== Organizations ==
- National Institute for Occupational Safety and Health
- National Mining Hall of Fame, in the United States

=== Leaders and innovators in mining ===
- Archimedes – invented the Archimedes' screw
- Charles Steen
- Daniel Guggenheim
- Ed Schieffelin
- George Stephenson – inventor of the Geordie lamp
- Henry Beecher Dierdorff – American inventor of mining equipment
- Herbert Hoover, engineer and writer on mining engineering (later President of the United States)
- Horace Austin Warner Tabor
- Humphry Davy – inventor of the Davy lamp
- Meyer Guggenheim
- Paddy Martinez
- William Boyce Thompson
- William Reid Clanny – inventor of the first safety lamp

== See also ==
- Billy Elliot
- Brassed Off
- Centre for Mined Land Rehabilitation
- European Route of Industrial Heritage
- Environmental impact of mining
- Mining
- National Coal Mining Museum for England
- National Mining Hall of Fame
- Salt-concrete
- Scientific drilling
- Well drilling
- Water mining
- Automated mining
