= Glory =

Glory may refer to:

- Glory (honor), high renown, praise, and honor obtained by notable achievements
  - Kleos, Greek word for "glory"

== Arts and entertainment ==
=== Fictional characters ===
- Glory (Buffy the Vampire Slayer), in the television series Buffy the Vampire Slayer
- Glory (character), a comic book superheroine from Image Comics
- Glory, a mainline My Little Pony unicorn pony

=== Films ===
- Glory (1956 film), an American musical directed by David Butler
- Glory (1989 film), an American historical war drama directed by Edward Zwick
- Glory (2016 film), a Bulgarian drama by Kristina Grozeva and Petar Valchanov

=== Music ===
==== Albums ====
- Glory (Britney Spears album), 2016
- Glory (Kutless album), 2014
- Glory (Manafest album) or the title song, 2006
- Glory (Perfume Genius album), 2025
- Glory (Michael W. Smith album), 2011
- Glory (Yo Yo Honey Singh album), 2024
- Glory (Teen Jesus and the Jean Teasers album), 2025
- Glory (EP) or the title song, by Iggy Azalea, 2012
- The Glory Album, by Christon Gray, 2016
- Glory, by Tomas Barfod, 2015
- The Glory (Olamide album), 2016

==== Songs ====
- "Glory" (Band-Maid song) 2018
- "Glory" (Bastille song), 2017
- "Glory" (Common and John Legend song), 2014
- "Glory" (Jay-Z song), 2012
- "Glory" (KMFDM song), 1994
- "Glory Song", a 1900 gospel song written by Charles H. Gabriel
- "Glory", by Arcángel from Sentimiento, Elegancia y Más Maldad, 2023
- "Glory", by Audio Adrenaline from Lift, 2001
- "Glory", by Childish Gambino from Culdesac, 2010
- "Glory", by Dermot Kennedy from Without Fear, 2019
- "Glory", by Doug Wimbish from Trippy Notes for Bass, 1999
- "Glory", by Hollywood Undead from American Tragedy, 2011
- "Glory", by Jessie J from R.O.S.E., 2018
- "Glory", by JID from God Does Like Ugly, 2025
- "Glory", by JoJo from LoveJo, 2014
- "Glory", by Lil Wayne from Free Weezy Album, 2015
- "Glory", by Sault from 11 (2022)
- "Glory", by Television from Adventure, 1978
- "Glory", by Young the Giant from Mirror Master, 2018
- "The Glory", by Kanye West from Graduation, 2007
- "The Glory", by The Cranberries from Something Else, 2017

=== Other art and entertainment ===
- Glory (Vladimir Nabokov novel), a 1932 novel by Vladimir Nabokov
- Glory (NoViolet Bulawayo novel), a 2022 novel by NoViolet Bulawayo
- The Glory, a 1994 novel by Herman Wouk
- Glory (sculpture), a 1999 sculpture by Gary R. Bibbs in Indianapolis, Indiana, US
- Glory, a work by Banksy
- Glory, the Pacific War counterpart to the Europa series of wargames
- Glory, a board game designed by Richard Berg published by GMT Games
- The Glory (TV series), a 2023 South Korean television series
- Glory (TV series), a 2026 Indian Hindi-language television series

== People ==
- Glory (singer) (born 1979), Puerto Rican reggaeton singer
- Glory (wrestler), Christie Ricci (born 1982), American professional wrestler
- Glory (name), list of people with the name

== Places ==
- Glory, Georgia, US
- Glory, Minnesota, US
- Glory, Texas, US

== Religion ==
- Glory of God, in Abrahamic religions, the manifestation of God's presence
- Glory (religious iconography) or halo, a crown, circle, or disk of light that surrounds a person in art
- Glorification, term for the canonization of a saint in the Eastern Orthodox Church
- Glory Be to the Father, also known as Gloria Patri, a Christian prayer, a doxology or short hymn of praise to God in various Christian liturgies

== Science and technology ==
- Glory (optical phenomenon), a halo-like optical phenomenon
- Glory (satellite), an earth science satellite which failed during launch in March 2011
- Ulmus parvifolia 'Glory', an elm cultivar
- Dongfeng Fengguang S560 and Fengon 580, Chinese SUVs sold in overseas markets as DFSK Glory 560 and 580, respectively

== Ships ==
- Glory (1802 ship), an East Indiaman
- Glory-class container ship, an eight-ship series operated by COSCO Shipping
- Carnival Glory, a ship operated by Carnival Cruise Line
- French ship Gloire, various ships of the French Navy
- HMS Glory, various ships of the British Navy
- London Glory, three successive tanker ships of London & Overseas Freighters

== Sports ==
- Glory (kickboxing), a world-wide kickboxing promotion
- Ohio Glory, a defunct American football team
- Perth Glory FC, an Australian football (soccer) team

== See also ==
- Gloria (disambiguation)
- Glore
- Glory, Glory (disambiguation)
- Glory hole (disambiguation)
- Morning glory (disambiguation)
