= Blantyre mining disaster =

1877 industrial accident in Scotland

Coordinates: 55°47′05″N 04°06′23″W

- 1877 disaster
- Date: 22 October 1877
- Time: 09:30
- Location: Blantyre, Scotland
- Type: Coal mine disaster
- Cause: Firedamp explosion caused by either a naked flame or a modified Davy lamp
- Deaths: 207
- Inquiries: Report by the Inspectors of Mines to both houses of Parliament by Command of Her Majesty
- OS grid reference: NS 68269 56240
- 1878 disaster
- Date: 5 March 1878
- Location: No 3 Pit, Blantyre Scotland
- Type: Coal mine disaster
- Cause: Winding gear overrun
- Deaths: 6
- Accused: Arthur Cleland
- Charges: Culpable homicide
- Verdict: Not proven
- 1879 disaster
- Date: 2 July 1879
- Time: 21:00
- Location: Blantyre, Scotland
- Type: Coal mine disaster
- Cause: Firedamp explosion (possible cause: smoking) triggering a coal dust explosion.
- Deaths: 28
- Inquiries: Explosion of fire-damp at Blantyre Colliery.

The Blantyre mining disaster, which happened on the morning of 22 October 1877, in Blantyre, Scotland, was Scotland's worst ever mining accident. Pits No. 2 and No. 3 of William Dixon's Blantyre Colliery were the site of an explosion which killed 207 miners, possibly more, with the youngest being a boy of 11. It was known that firedamp was present in the pit and it is likely that this was ignited by a naked flame. The accident left 92 widows and 250 fatherless children.

Blantyre was also the scene of two further disasters (Note: 5 or more killed, the definition used by the Durham Mining Museum.) in 1878 and 1879. There was a succession of lesser fatalities, some of which—particularly in the earlier years—were caused by firedamp.

== Background ==
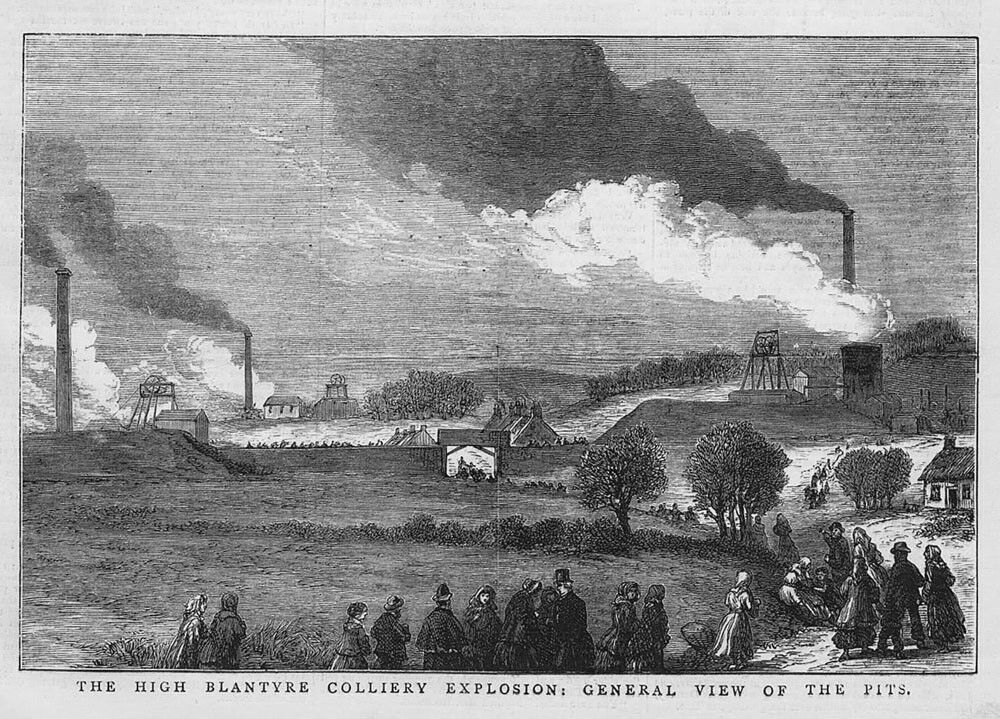
High Blantyre Colliery, General View of the Pits – The Pictorial World 1877

=== Seams ===
The Lanarkshire coalfield in the vicinity of Blantyre had three seams of coal being worked in the 1870s. They were the ell coal, 7 feet (2.1 m) thick at 117 fathoms (702 ft; 214 m); the main coal, 4.5 feet (1.4 m) thick at 129 fathoms (774 ft; 236 m) and the splint coal, 5.5 feet (1.7 m) thick at 155 fathoms (930 ft; 283 m). Precise depths vary with the elevation of the top of the various shafts.

The Blantyre colliery had five shafts:

- No. 1, 24 feet (7.3 m) by 8 feet (2.4 m) working the ell and main coals.
- No. 2. 16 feet (4.9 m) by 8 feet (2.4 m) working the splint coal.
- No. 3. 24 feet (7.3 m) by 8 feet (2.4 m) working the splint coal.
- No. 4. 24 feet (7.3 m) by 8 feet (2.4 m) working the splint coal. At the time of the explosion No. 4 had not yet connected with the rest of the colliery.
- No. 5. 10 feet (3.0 m) diameter used as the upcast (Note: Ventillation of mines was not done by using piped air, instead one or more pits were downcast where air was drawn down into the mine and one or more upcast where air was expelled. Men and materials commonly travelled in downcast pits as the air in upcast pits was hot and foul.) for numbers 1, 2 and 3.

Numbers 2 and 5 shafts were close to each other, within 30 yards (27 m). Number 3 shaft was 680 yards (620 m) away. Number 1 shaft was between the two but only reached the ell and main coals. Blind pits, that is shafts that do not extend to the surface, connected the ell and main coals to the splint coal. The main coal ceased to be worked in November 1878 and the passages from shaft 1 bricked up. Shaft 1 continued to work the ell coal.

Four main districts were formed in the splint coal:

- A smaller area with workings to the north and south of number 3 pit.
- An area lying in the north-west quadrant from number 2 pit.
- An area lying in the south-west quadrant from number 2 pit.
- An area lying in the south east quadrant from number 2 pit close to, and in communication with, the workings from number 3 pit.

Conditions in the mine were held to be poor by the colliers. The previous year the miners had sought a wage rise to compensate for the poor safety and been refused. They went on strike and were immediately sacked. Since the miners lived in tied cottages they were therefore evicted by force. The mine owners then brought in Irish Catholics to work the mine.

=== Workings ===
Most of the coal was worked using the Newcastle system, also known as "pillar and stall" or "stoop and room". A heading was driven into the coal and at intervals along it rooms were excavated, around 12 feet (3.7 m) wide. As the rooms got deeper another heading was driven from room to room to leave pillars (or stoops) about 20 yards (18 m) square behind. During this stage only around 30% of the coal was extracted. Eventually the whole district consisted of a grid pattern of passageways around stoops. The final stage in extraction was "stooping". The furthermost roof was supported by pit props and the stoops removed. Once a complete row of stoops had gone the props were removed from the furthest part which would collapse into the space ("goaf" or "gove") behind. During this process settlement and fracturing of the roof and seams above could occur, potentially releasing larger quantities of gas.

The alternative method of working the coal was the longwall system. Two headers were driven forward to the far end of the district and an interconnecting passageway excavated. The passageway was supported by props and the long wall on the shaft side of the passage excavated. As this wall retreated the roof was propped and the furthermost props removed, allowing the overburden to collapse into the goaf. With longwall the same fracturing and gas release that stooping could cause was always present.

The ell coal was mainly worked by stoop and room, with longwall in the southern part only. The main was exclusively worked by longwall and the splint (apart from a trial section) worked by stoop and room.

=== Ventilation ===
In collieries at that time air circulation was induced by a furnace at the base of the upcast pit. Hot air rising up the pit, as if up a chimney, drew the exhausted and contaminated air out of the galleries. Downcast pits let the fresh air in to replace it. The route the air took was carefully controlled by doors and partitions. At Blantyre pit, number 5 was the upcast shaft for pits 1, 2 and 3. About 5 tons of coal were burnt per day in two out of three grates, each 7 feet (2.1 m) by 4 feet (1.2 m).

Air for the ell coal was drawn down pit number 1. At the base it split north and south then after passing around the respective parts of the workings it was led to the upcast pit.

Ventilation in the splint coal was more complex. Air from number 3 pit was split in two and passed along the north and south levels. After passing through the respective workings the two currents passed through the north and south headings before recombining on the "rise" (west) side and passing into the workings of number 2 pit. On average the air circuit was 2,400 yards (2,200 m) in number 3 pit.

Air was drawn down number 2 and split in two. The larger portion went north, circulated around the north-west workings for 3,674 yards (3,360 m) before returning to the upcast pit. The smaller part was led to the south, circulated around the south-western area for 2,901 yards (2,653 m) and then back to the upcast. The air from number 3 pit entered the workings associated with number 2 pit in the east and circulated around number 2 pit's south-eastern portion before finally reaching the upcast. The air circuit at 3,500 yards (3,200 m) might not be considered excessive, but when both pits are added the total circuit was 8,096 yards (7,403 m). After the disaster this policy of using the air from number 3 workings to ventilate number 2 workings was roundly condemned in the trade press: "It is a very dangerous system, and should be abandoned at once".

== Disaster ==
=== Explosion ===
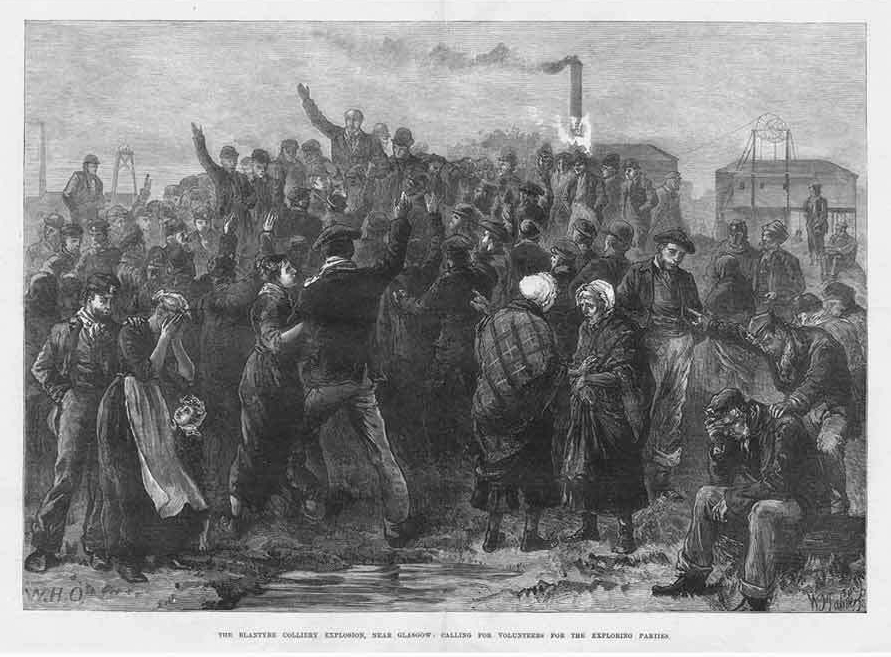
Calling for volunteers for the exploring parties - Illustrated London News 1877

On the morning of 22 October 1877 nothing was thought to be amiss. The officials seemed to think that the workings were in their normal state. At 04:40 four firemen (Note: Firemen: miners who in earlier times looked for firedamp and set fire to it in a controlled manner. By 1877 their duties only extended to testing for firedamp.) inspected number 2 pit. At 05:30 the regular workmen started to descend. The firemen assured the workers all was well and ascended to sign reports and have breakfast. Having received these assurances the workforce went about their various tasks.

At around 09:00 a blast was heard on the surface and flame and steam rushed up number 3 pit for a few minutes. Smoke was seen from the upcast pit and air came from number 2. Nothing was seen from number 1 pit, but below ground the miners felt the blast and at once ascended. The smoke was seen in the surrounding area so miners and managers hurried to the pithead. Shortly after 10:00 the Inspector of Mines, Mr Moore, and the Assistant Inspector, Mr Robson, were alerted by telegraph. They arrived at the colliery at noon.

=== Rescue attempts ===
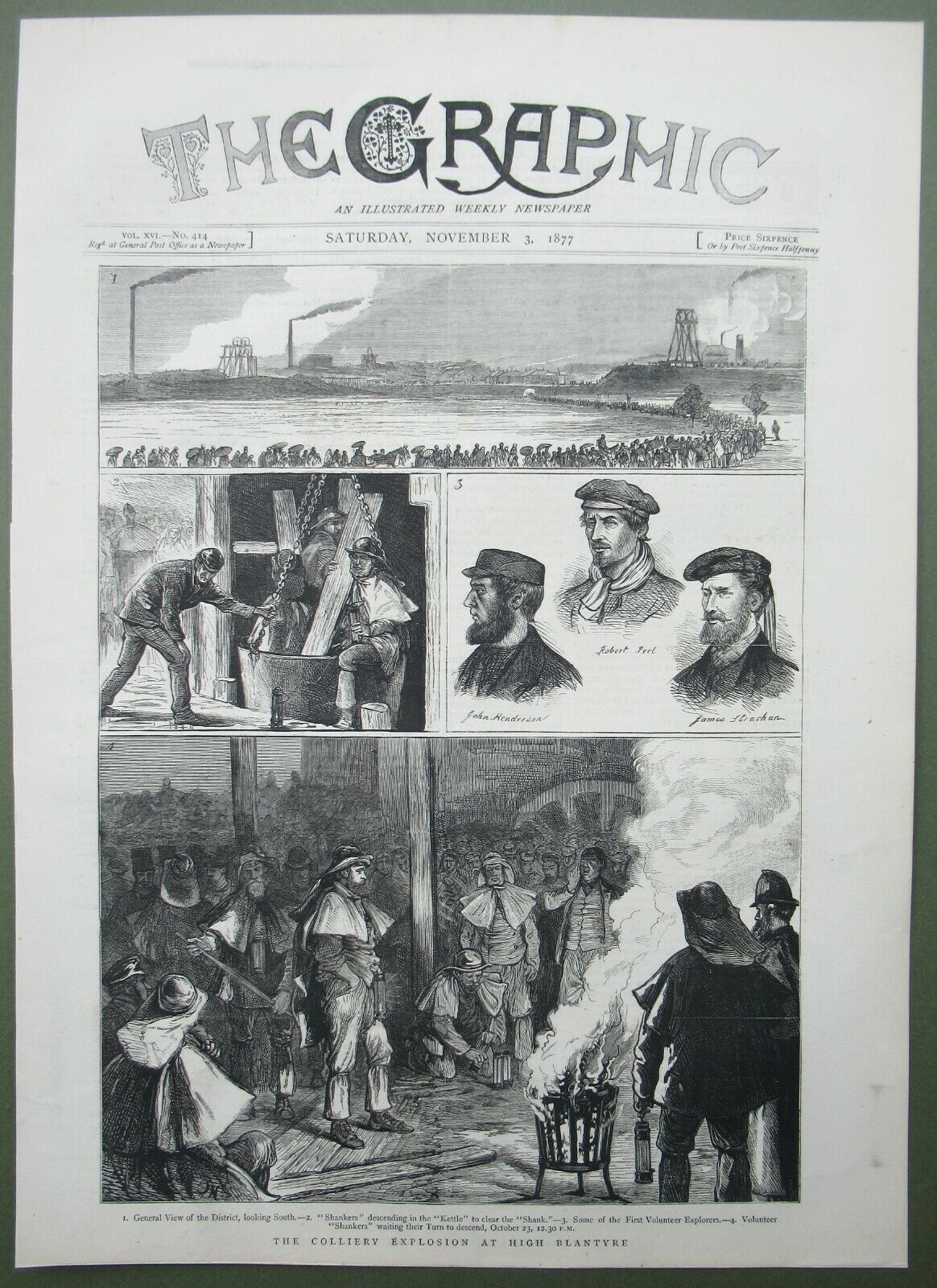
Rescue operations – The Graphic 1877

Number 3 pit was blocked by debris falling from the damaged shaft and by tubs and similar being blown up the shaft. The cages and ropes had been damaged, so an attempt at descending was made in a "kettle", basically a large bucket. Air was still travelling down the shaft and voices could be heard at the bottom, below the blockage. Number 2 pit was relatively undamaged; normal winding operations could continue. Moore, Robson and some engineers went down number 2 pit but were stopped by falls and afterdamp. (Note: Miners have traditionally referred to various gases as damps. The most common damps are: firedamp – mainly methane, blackdamp or chokedamp – nitrogen and carbon dioxide with no oxygen, whitedamp – carbon monoxide rich air from the incomplete combustion of coal or firedamp, stinkdamp – hydrogen sulphide and other damps and afterdamp – the gas formed by an explosion. Afterdamp is particularly feared, it contains varying proportions of blackdamp and whitedamp and is therefore suffocating, toxic, or explosive, or any combination of these.) The route to number 3 pit ("More's dook") appeared to be free of falls but was full of chokedamp.

A brattice (Note: A brattice is a partition (usually of timber, but in an emergency possibly of cloth) which seals off air flow) was constructed to divert the air passing from number 3 pit directly to the upcast, and by this means More's dook became passable by 22:00. Four survivors were found, all badly injured. One of them, a boy, died shortly afterwards. The remaining three were brought to the surface through number 2 pit and sent to Glasgow Infirmary, but all died within the month. Rescue parties explored number 3 pit as far as they could, but were limited by chokedamp and firedamp. Seventeen bodies were found and brought to the foot of the blocked number 3 shaft for later retrieval. The shaft was unstable, and if it closed up the rescuers would be deprived of air so they retreated until the shaft could be secured from above. All hope of finding more survivors was abandoned.

=== Recovery phase ===
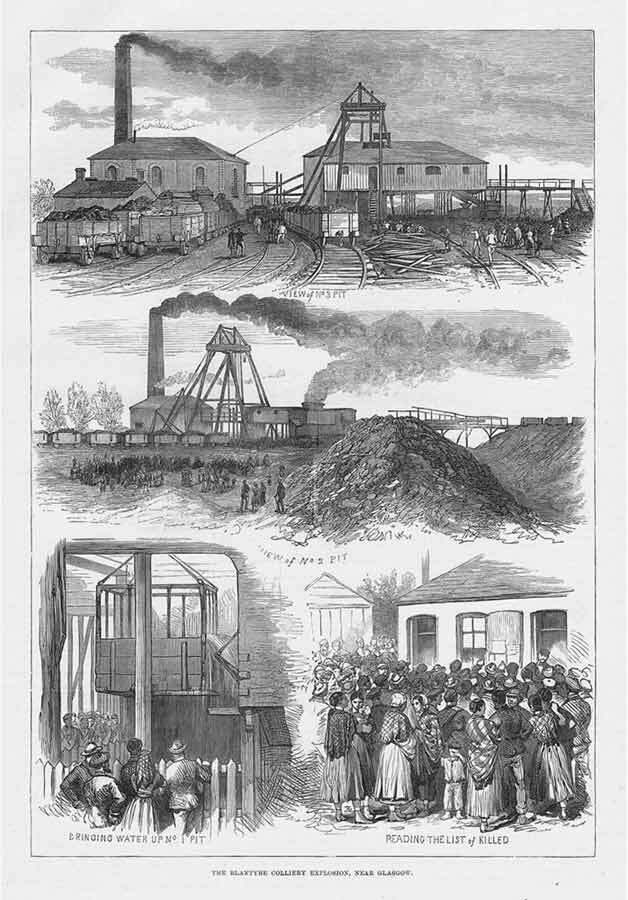
The list of the killed is read out – Illustrated London News

The following day, Tuesday 23 October, an underground engine at the upcast was adapted to assist the ventilation. The slide valve was removed and steam sent down. The escaping hot steam rising up the upcast drew the air around the mine in the same way that the furnaces would. By this means 70% of the normal air supply was restored and recovery work could commence. All the men in the northern part of the colliery had left their work and headed for number 2 pit, only to be overcome by chokedamp before reaching safety. Ventilation continued until Saturday 27 when the debris at the foot of number 3 shaft could be cleared. By Sunday the first bodies could be brought up number 3 shaft, but it was not until Thursday 1 November that the mine was free of gas and recovery could be carried on from both downcast pits.

=== Investigation ===
The investigations commenced as soon as the air was safe. Significant damage had been done in both the number 2 and number 3 workings, though particularly in number 3 pit. Damage in number 2 pit was mainly in the south eastern part, that in communication with, and ventilated from, pit 3. This was the area where stooping was occurring, so that the place most likely to be liberating firedamp was being ventilated with firedamp laden air from number 3 pit. The official report notes that naked flames and blasting were allowed throughout the colliery, except in the area around the stooping. Near there no blasting was permitted and all lamps had to be "gauze lamps".

The report states: "These gauze or safety lamps were not Davy lamps, but of a kind in common use throughout Scotland. They are much larger than the Davy lamp and give a better light. Mr Moore [the lead inspector] has frequently tested them in gas, and on no occasion has the gas been exploded outside". Lupton, writing 15 years later, inveighs against modifications to the Davy lamp including: "The larger the lamp the greater the force of the explosion, and if the lamp were too large, the explosion would force the flame through the gauze; for that reason the diameter of the gauze must never be larger than 1 1/2 inch". In addition, the Blantyre explosion was before Trimdon Grange (1882) and the Bedford Colliery Disaster of 1886 and so the shielding of gauzes from direct currents of air had not yet been introduced. Notwithstanding Moore's claims for the Scottish safety lamp, the report's conclusions call for the banning of naked lights and the introduction of locked Davy lamps which "are better than the present safety lamps".

The report also roundly criticises poor discipline (including shots being fired by unauthorised workers), poor ventilation around old or incomplete stoops and the whole method of ventilating one pit from another. The report does not come to a firm conclusion about how the explosion started.

=== Aftermath ===
It is reported that, six months after the accident, Dixon's raised summonses against 34 widows whose husbands had been killed and who had not left the tied cottages which they and their husbands had rented from the mining company. They were evicted two weeks later, on 28 May 1878.

== Further incidents ==
=== 1878 lift crash ===
On 5 March 1878 at No. 3 Pit, six men were killed when the cage they were in was drawn up past the top of the pit and 32 feet (9.8 m) into the pithead wheels. The cage was wrecked and overturned, throwing six men to the bottom of the 900 ft (270 m) shaft. A seventh man (James Gerrity) managed to hold on until he was assisted down and, apart from being shaken, was unhurt.

At the time of the accident, Mr J T Robson (Assistant Government Inspector for the district) and Mr Robert Robson (his assistant) were in the colliery office with Mr Watson, the manager. Robert Robson descended number 2 pit and went to the bottom of the number 3 shaft to supervise the recovery of the bodies from a flooded sump. Meanwhile, several men descended number 3 pit in a "kettle" to examine the shaft for damage. The shaft itself being undamaged, the bodies were recovered that way.

The engine keeper, Arthur Cleland, stated that "something had gone wrong" with the indicator to the colliery engineer, James Patterson, was in the vicinity at the time of the accident. Patterson examined the indicator which showed the cage's position and found it registered 40 fathoms (240 ft; 73 m) from the pit head, about a quarter of the shaft's total depth. Cleland was advised to stay but left shortly afterwards. After going home to clean up and change Cleland was observed heading across the fields towards Glasgow but was overtaken by a policeman and arrested. After helping down Gerrity, Patterson had returned to the engine house and seen that the indicator now showed 7 fathoms (42 ft; 13 m) although the cage had not moved in the meantime.

Cleland was charged with culpable homicide and tried at the High Court in Glasgow on 24 April. At the trial Patterson said that when he touched the indicator it was "very loose. He had never noticed it so loose before". Two engineers called for the defence at the trial also criticised the method of attaching the indicator as "not proper" and "not ... to be the best mode known to engineers". Michael Flanagan, a furnaceman at the pithead, reported that Cleland said "the indicator was wrong" and Flanagan observed that the indicator was further down than it should have been. The manager, Watson, admitted under cross-examination that it was the duty of the oversman to examine the indicator but he did not do so. Most witnesses also gave Cleland a good character reference. After a short retirement, the jury returned a verdict of not proven.

=== 1879 explosion ===
The 1879 disaster occurred in the ell coal, the shallowest of the three seams. The coal was worked from number 1 pit which was the downcast. There was a "blind pit" down to the main coal, which was no longer being worked, and a communication mine down to the splint coal at the foot of pit number 3. Air came down number 1 pit and the current was split to ventilate the north and south workings respectively. The south current passed along the south level for 770 yards (700 m) to the southern extremity. It passed through the longwall workings there and returned via the older stoop and room workings before joining the north current return and passing up the upcast, number 5 pit. The inspectors report concluded "1 That the arrangements for the ventillation of this pit were sufficient, and that the quantity of air sent in was ample under ordinary conditions".

Although the owners banned the men from opening lamps or from taking smoking materials below ground, several prosecutions had occurred for breaches of the rules. The last such was the day before the explosion when a miner was fined £2 (equivalent to £215 in 2025 (Note: UK Consumer Price Index inflation figures from 1209–2024 based on data from "Inflation calculator". Bank of England. London. 18 February 2026.)) for opening his lamp.

The explosion was first noticed on the surface as a "sharp retort" at 21:00 on Wednesday 2 July 1879. Once John White, the oversman, had been summoned an attempt was made to lower the cage, but it stuck. White then descended number 3 pit and found that the men there were unaware of the explosion. He, a group of men, and shortly afterwards Mr Watson (the manager) proceeded up the communication mine into number 1 pit's workings. Parties descended the blind pit into the main coal and other parties searched the north workings and both reported all was well. Exploration of the south workings was stopped by falls and afterdamp. Various attempts were made to recover the bodies during the Thursday, but it was 04:00 on Friday before the whole workings could be reached and recovery completed.

Not all the safety lamps were found; however, one was found that was unlocked. Smoking materials including matches were found in the clothes of the deceased, one man was found with a half full pipe in his hand. Several men had unofficial (and therefore illegal) lamp-keys on them. In the immediate vicinity of the seat of the explosion little burning was seen, the supposition was that a firedamp explosion had raised dust in the passageways and the coal dust had exploded. The official investigation tentatively suggested that shot firing had displaced the gas towards the area where men were smoking and that a naked flame there triggered off the explosion.

== Legacy ==
=== Memorial ===
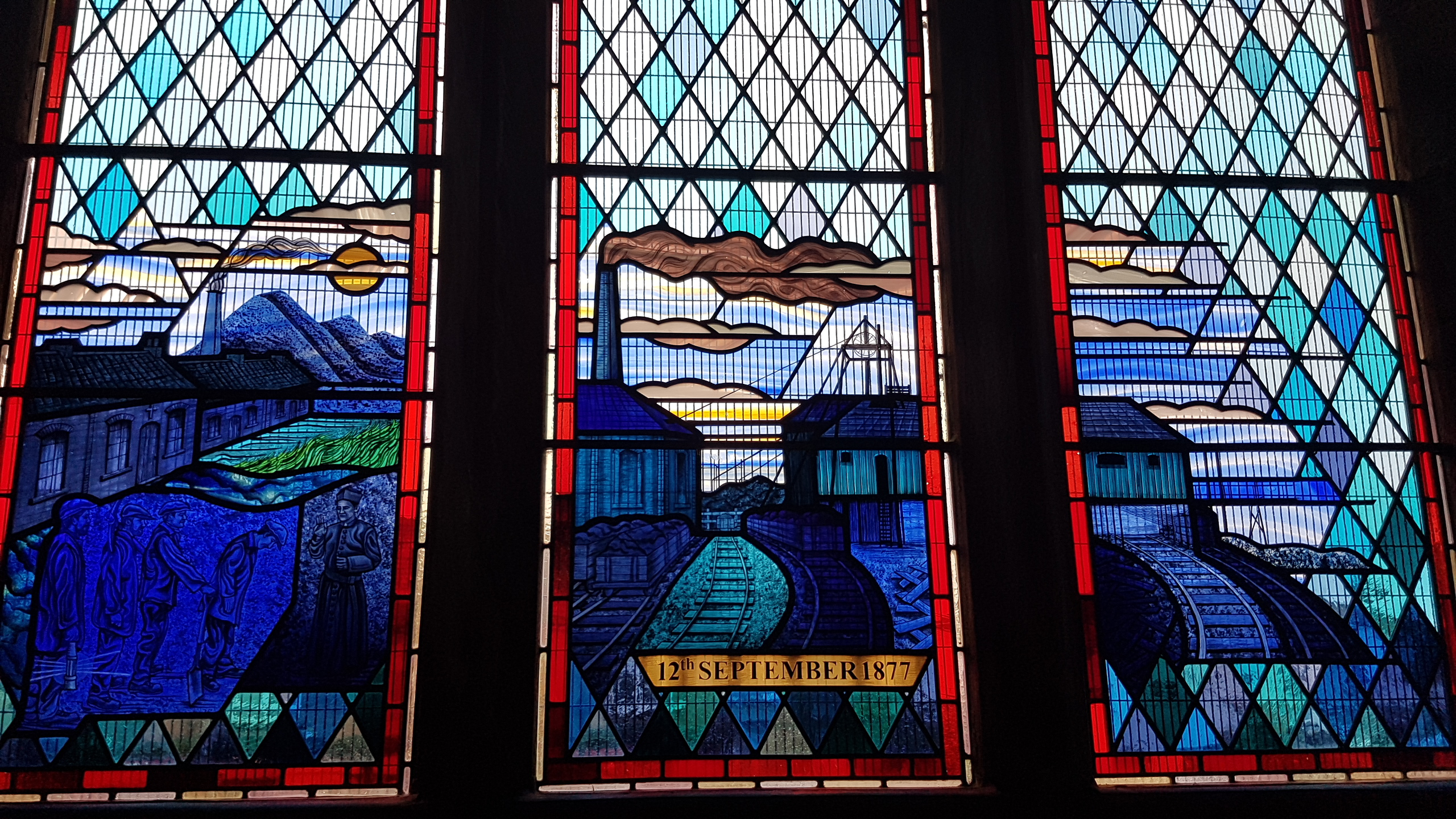
A memorial window at St Joseph's, Blantyre

The mine owner erected a 5.5-metre-tall granite monument to mark the two explosion disasters. An engraved dedication reads: "William Dixon Ltd—in memory of 240 of their workmen who were killed by explosions in Blantyre Colliery on 22 October 1877 and 2 July 1879 and many of whom are buried here". There is also a memorial to the Catholic miners killed in the disaster of October 1877 which is located in Dalbeth Cemetery, London Road, Glasgow. In addition a memorial commemorating the centenary is located at Blantyre Cross, Blantyre. An incomplete list of the deaths is given in Veverka 2015.

=== Music ===
Irish folk artist Christy Moore recorded a song called "Blantyre Explosion". It appears on his 1985 album Ordinary Man. It had previously been recorded by Ewan MacColl and Dick Gaughan. The exact origin of the song is unknown, but it is thought to have been collected by A. L. Lloyd from an unnamed local singer. The text first appears in LLoyd's 1951 book "coaldust ballads".

== See also ==
- List of disasters in Great Britain and Ireland
