= Glory (ship) =

Several vessels have been named Glory:

- Glory was launched in Bermuda in 1801. The French captured her and she became the privateer Morne Fortunee that the Royal Navy captured and took into service in 1803 as HMS Morne Fortunee. She was wrecked in 1804.
- Glory (1802 ship) was an East Indiaman launched in 1802. She made two complete voyages as an "extra ship" for the British East India Company (EIC) before she disappeared in November 1808 while homeward bound from her third voyage. On her second voyage she participated in the British expedition to capture the Cape of Good Hope.
- Glory (1811 ship) was launched in Quebec in 1811. She sailed to London in 1812, and was registered there. In 1817 she made a voyage to Bengal, sailing under a licence from the British East India Company (EIC). A voyage transporting convicts to New South Wales followed. She then returned to general trading and was last listed in 1824.

== See also ==
- HMS Glory – any one of 10 vessels of the Royal Navy
- French ship Gloire
