= Udston mining disaster =

Coordinates: 55.772°N 4.087°W

The Udston mining disaster occurred in Hamilton, Scotland on Saturday, 28 May 1887 when 73 miners died in a firedamp explosion at Udston Colliery. Caused, it is thought, by unauthorised shot firing the explosion is said to be Scotland's second worst coal mining disaster.

Keir Hardie, then Secretary of the Scottish Miners' Federation, denounced the deaths as murder a few days later.

== Location ==
The Udston Colliery, owned by the Udston Coal Company, was situated at the top of Hillhouse, Hamilton behind where Townhill Road now runs. Opened in 1875, it was a small pit employing approximately 200 men and boys working in three coal seams at depths of up to 1,000 feet (300 m) underground. The workings of the colliery extended for 150 acres (0.61 km^{2}) and were bordered on three sides by the Blantyre, Earnock, and Greenfield Collieries. The last remaining colliery buildings and the pit waste were removed in 2002 and today the site of the colliery is now a housing estate and part of Hamilton’s western expansion programme.

== The disaster ==
The morning of 28 May, 184 men had entered the mine. At 9 am, having been already at work for almost three hours, many of the day shift put down their tools for their breakfast. During this break, at approximately 9:07 am, an explosion ripped through the Splint Seam destroying everything in its path. At the time of the explosion all but two of the 184 workers were still in the pit.

The explosion manifested itself in a volume of flame and dust at the number two or downcast shaft, followed seconds later by a volume of flame from the upcast or number one shaft which set fire to the wooden sheds or headings above it.

The sound of the explosion was heard in neighbouring Greenfield Colliery through a 135-foot (41 m) barrier of solid coal. In the Blantyre Colliery (where an estimated 216 men had lost their lives 10 years earlier) miners working that morning were temporarily blinded with the dust thrown up by the vibration of the explosion. An initial assessment of the damage by one of the managers revealed both compartments of No 1 shaft and one of the compartments of No 2 Pit were blocked by the cages used to lower the miners.

Rescue efforts were immediate, first by volunteers who were then aided by experienced miners from nearby collieries. By 3 pm all the men in the Ell and Main Coals were evacuated and it was discovered that these coal seams were not damaged from the explosion. Five of the men in the main coal shaft died of choke-damp arising from the Splint Coal. The Splint Coal workings were ventilated for exploration and removal of the deceased. 45 hours after the explosion they had all been explored and almost all of the bodies removed. Two men were found alive at the bottom of pit 2, however all others were deceased.

The official causes of death were determined by Dr. Robertson of Hamilton. In his examination of the bodies he confirmed that 53 were burned and 20 were suffocated.

The 73 men who died at the Udston disaster were paid on average 3/3d (16p) per day or 17/6 (86p) per week (equivalent to £69.72 per week today in 2007) .

The investigation into the explosion by the Inspector of Mines, Ralph Moore, Esq, concluded that the explosion was likely caused by a (coal) dust explosion as a result of unauthorized shot-firing.

Upon full consideration of the whole matter I am of opinion that this was a dust explosion, and that it originated in some place in the Rise Section (probably Dennison's) where some gas was present; that a shot was fired in the place surreptitiously and without an examination for gas : that when the shot was fired, it ignited the gas which was in the place, and a cloud of coal dust was raised. The ignited gas produced sufficient heat to kindle the dust into a flame, which traversed the whole workings, raising in its progress, sufficient dust to maintain the combustion. This explosion is, in my opinion, another argument in favour of the abolition of the use of explosives in all fiery and dusty mines

== Memorials ==
In December 2001 South Lanarkshire Council acknowledged the disaster by placing a commemorative plaque on the miner’s statue standing outside Brandon Gate council offices in Hamilton’s Brandon Street. Accepting the plaque on behalf of the victims was Hamilton’s oldest surviving retired coal miner, 96-year-old Jimmy Glen who, in 1917 at the age of 13 years, started work at the screening tables in the Bent Colliery.

In 2002, a memorial plaque dedicated to the six East Kilbride miners, who died in the disaster, was unveiled in the memorial garden at Priestknowe roundabout in East Kilbride.
