= Whistle =

Instrument which produces sound from a stream of forced air

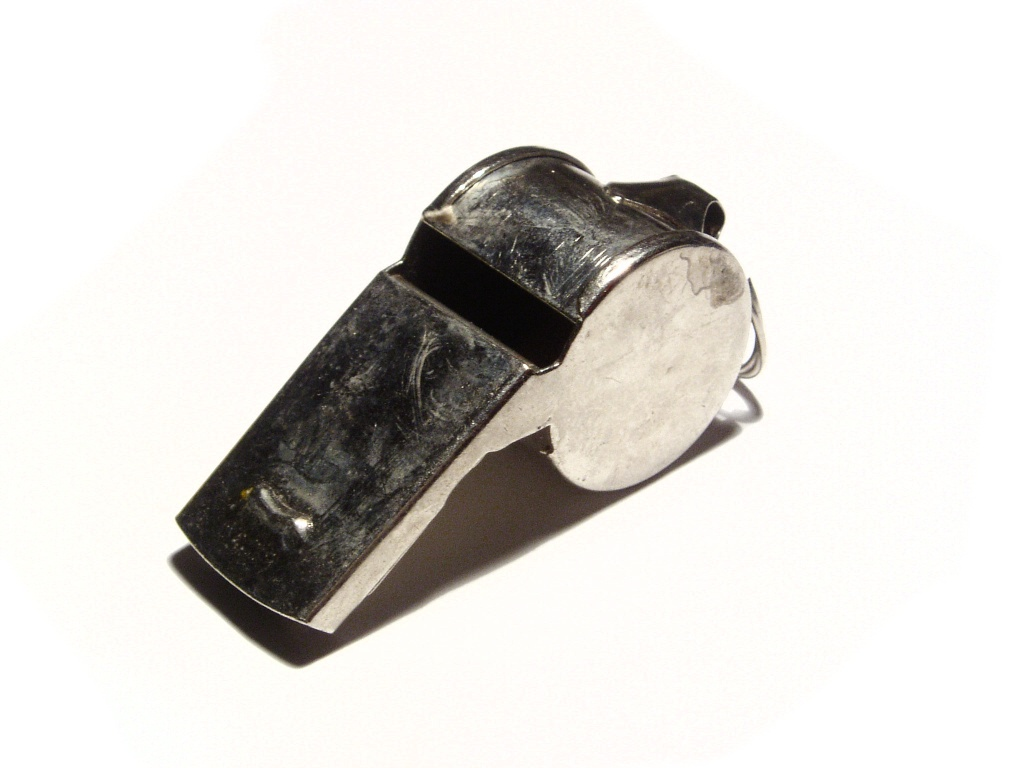
A metal pea whistle

A 3D-printable whistle

A whistle is a musical instrument which produces sound from a stream of gas, most commonly air. The whistle makes a high-pitched, piercing, and shrill sound. It is a type of fipple flute, and may be mouth-operated, or powered by air pressure, steam, or other means. Whistles vary in size from a small slide whistle or nose flute type to a large multi-piped church organ.

Whistles have been around since early humans first carved out a gourd or branch and found they could make sound with it. In prehistoric Egypt, small shells were used as whistles. Many present day wind instruments are inheritors of these early whistles. With the rise of more mechanical power, other forms of whistles have been developed.

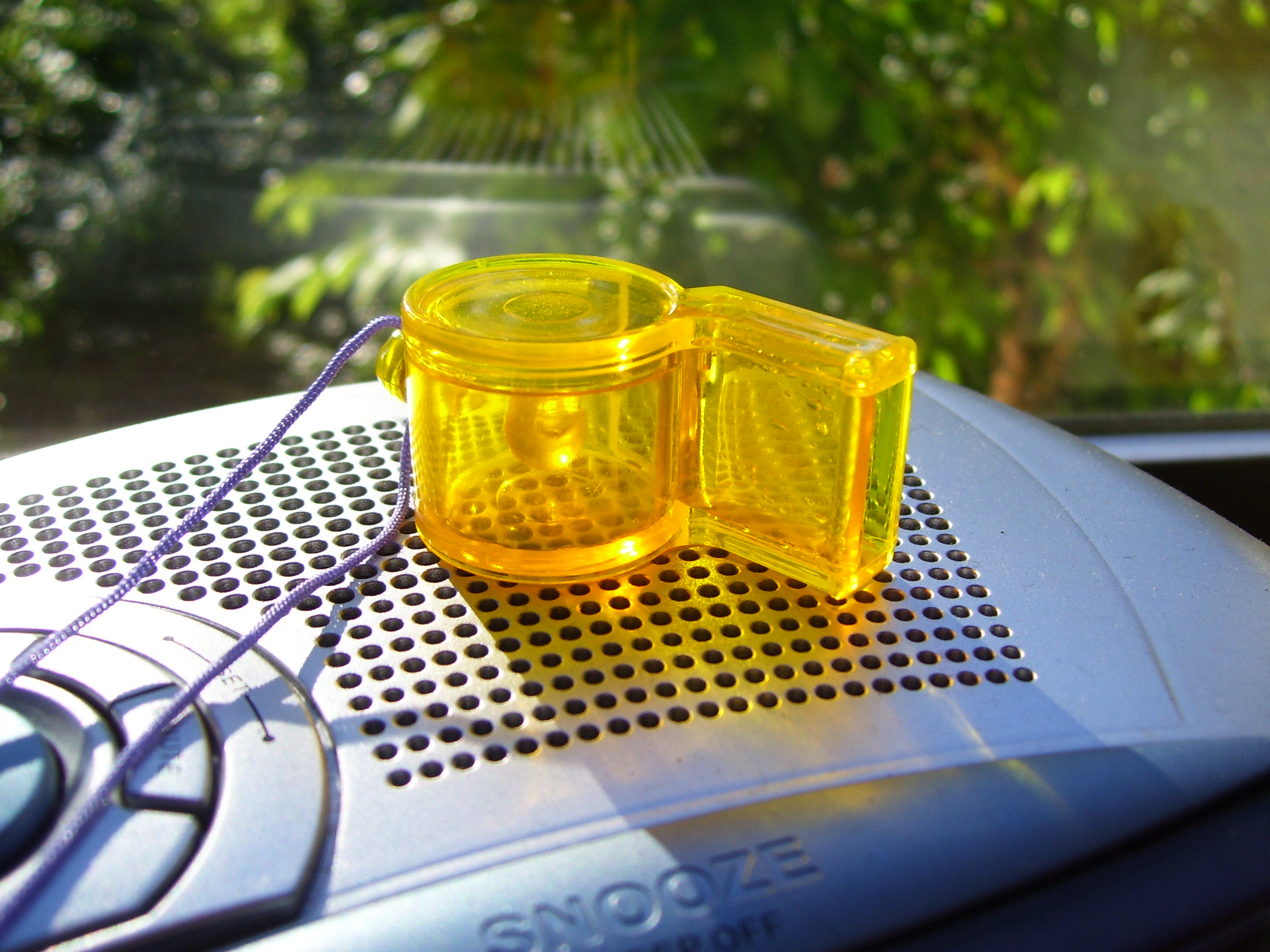
A party whistle

One characteristic of a whistle is that it creates a pure, or nearly pure, tone. The conversion of flow energy to sound comes from an interaction between a solid material and a fluid stream. The forces in some whistles are sufficient to set the solid material in motion. Classic examples are Aeolian tones that result in galloping power lines, or the Tacoma Narrows Bridge (the so-called "Galloping Gertie" of popular media). Other examples are circular disks set into vibration.

== History ==
=== Early whistles ===
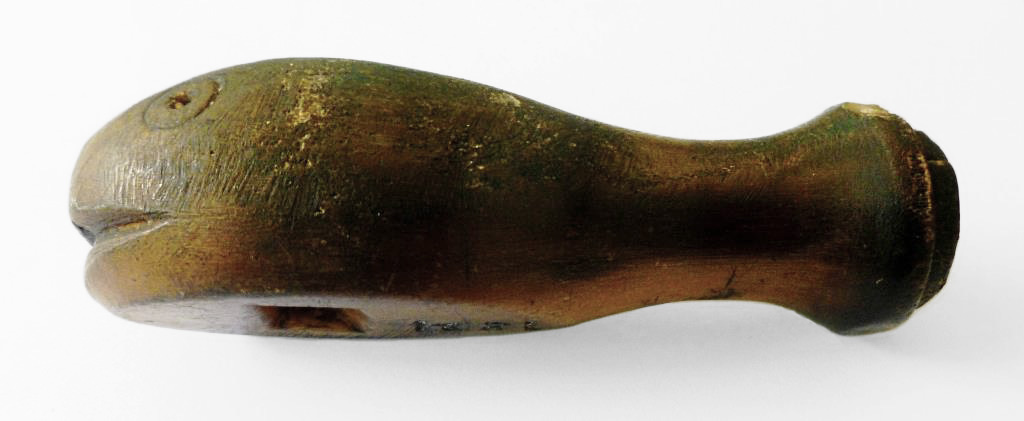
Carved whalebone whistle dated 1821. 8 cm long.

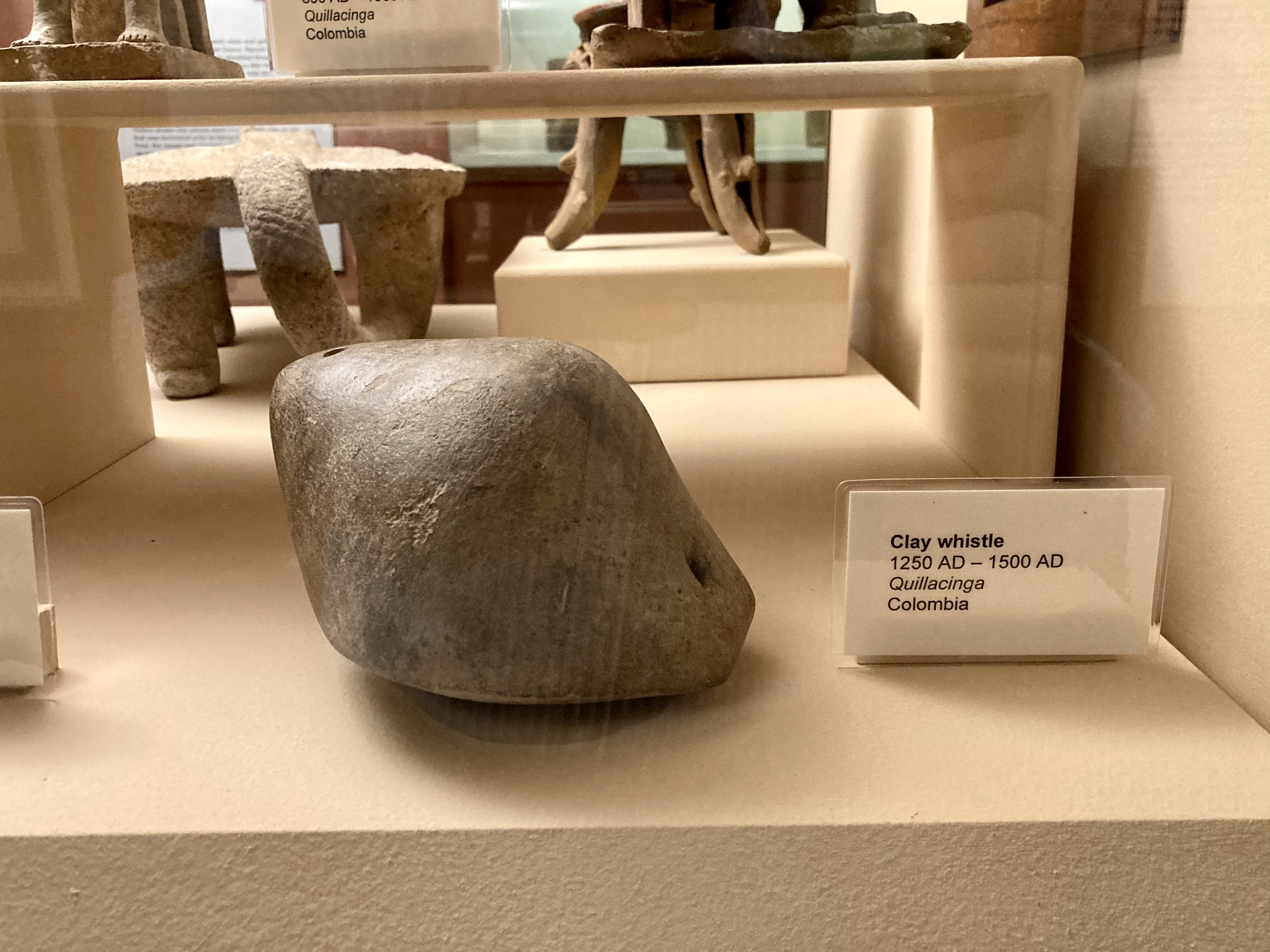
Quillacinga clay whistle, c. 1250–1500 AD, at the Museum of Texas Tech University.

Whistles made of bone or wood have been used for thousands of years. Whistles were used by the Ancient Greeks to keep the stroke of galley slaves. Archaeologists have found a terracotta whistle at the ruins of the ancient Greek city of Assos, most probably a child's toy placed in a child's grave as a burial gift. The English used whistles during the Crusades to signal orders to archers. Bosun's whistles were also used in the Age of Sail aboard naval vessels to issue commands and salute dignitaries.

=== Joseph Hudson ===
Joseph Hudson set up J Hudson & Co in Birmingham in 1870. With his younger brother James, he designed the "Acme City" brass whistle. This became the first referee whistle used at association football matches during the 1878–79 Football Association Cup match between Nottingham Forest and Sheffield. Prior to the introduction of the whistle, handkerchiefs were used by the umpires to signal to the players.

A police whistle being blown

In 1883, he began experimenting with pea-whistle designs that could produce an intense sound that could grab attention from over a mile away. His invention was discovered by accident when he dropped his violin and it shattered on the floor. Observing how the discordant sound of the breaking strings travelled (trill effect), Hudson had the idea to put a pea in the whistle. Prior to this, whistles were much quieter and were only thought of as musical instruments or toys for children. After observing the problems that local police were having with effectively communicating with rattles, he realised that his whistle designs could be used as an effective aid to their work.

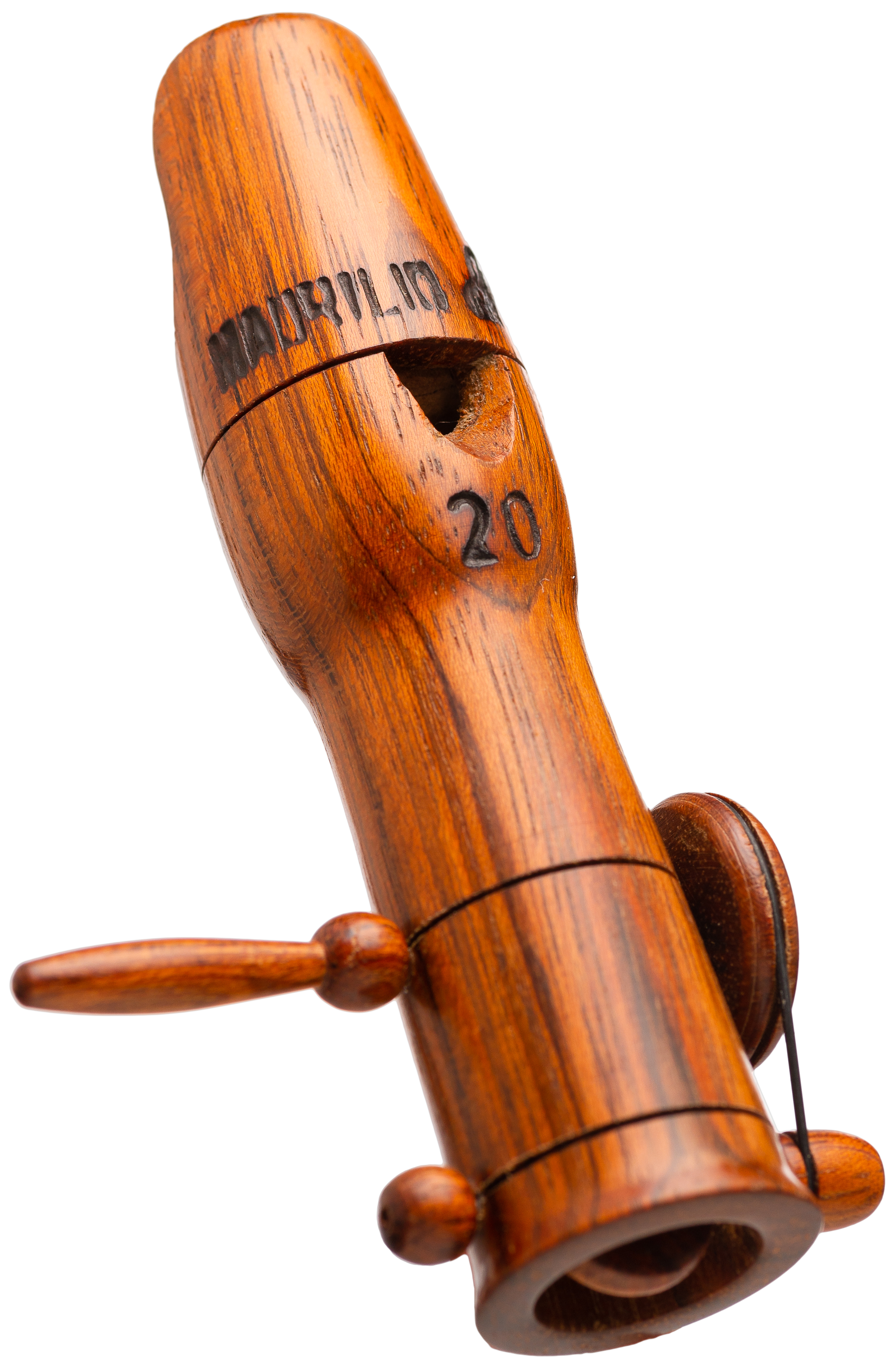
Bird whistle

Hudson demonstrated his whistle to Scotland Yard and was awarded his first contract in 1884. Both rattles and whistles were used to call for back-up in areas where neighbourhood beats overlapped, and following their success in the Metropolitan Police of London, the whistle was adopted by most police forces in the United Kingdom.

=== World War I ===
During World War I, officers of the British Army and United States Army used whistles to communicate with troops, command charges and warn when artillery pieces were going to fire. Most whistles used by the British were manufactured by J & Hudson Co.

== See also ==
- Vessel flute (acoustics of whistles and tunable whistles)
- Low whistle (low-pitched tinwhistle or flageolet)
- Liquid whistle (mixes fluids)
- Physics of whistles
- Firedamp whistle (for detecting methane in mines)
- Whistler (radio) (very low frequency radio feature caused by lightning and atmospheric effects)
- Rossby whistle (climate oscillation of the Caribbean)
- Apito (whistle used in samba)
