= Glories =

Glories may refer to:

- The plural of the English word glory
- Glòries, a usual shortened form of Plaça de les Glòries Catalanes, a major square in Barcelona.
