= Glory hole (disambiguation) =

A glory hole is a hole in a wall, or other partition, through which people engage in sexual activity.

Glory hole or gloryhole may also refer to:

== Places ==
- Glory Hole Park in Aspen, Colorado
- Glory Hole, a colloquial name for the spillway in California's Monticello Dam at Lake Berryessa.
- L'îlot de La Boisselle, a site known as Glory Hole to British soldiers during World War I
- High Bridge, a bridge in Lincoln, England also known as Glory Hole

== Other ==
- Glory hole, a cupboard in which items are stored in some disorder; in use in the British merchant and Royal Navy, and in Scotland and Northern England.
- Glory hole (petroleum production), a type of underwater excavation
- Glory hole in glassblowing, a second furnace used for reheating
- Glory hole (mining), a surface depression or pinge produced by block caving
- Glory hole, an uncontrolled spillway design
- Gloryhole (album), a 1992 album by noise rock band Ed Hall
- "Gloryhole", a 2014 song by Steel Panther

== See also ==
- The Glory Hole (disambiguation)
