= Glory (name) =

Glory is a given name. Notable people with the name include:

- Glory (singer), (born 1979), Puerto Rican singer
- Glory (wrestler) (born 1982), American professional wrestler also known as Christie Ricci
- Glory Alozie (born 1977), Nigerian-Spanish athlete
- Glory Annen (1952–2017), Canadian actress
- Glory Chukwu, Nigerian beauty pageant contestant
- Glory Emmanuel Edet, Nigerian lecturer and commissioner
- Glory Edim (born 1982), American writer
- Glory Iroka (born 1990), Nigerian footballer
- Glory Johnson (born 1990), American basketball player
- Glory Leppänen (1901—1979), Finnish actress, writer, theatre and film director
- Glory Nzingo (born 2004), Irish footballer
- Glory Odiase (born 1993), Nigerian cyclist
- Glory Ogbonna (born 1998), Nigerian footballer
- Glory Onome Nathaniel (born 1996), Nigerian athlete
- Glory Sedibe (1953–1994), South African freedom fighter
- Glory Van Scott (born 1947), American dancer, actress, and educator

== See also ==
- Glory (disambiguation)
- Glory-Anne Carriere (born 1947), Canadian country singer
