= The Glory Hole (disambiguation) =

The Glory Hole is a musical recording by Goodbye Mr. Mackenzie.

The Glory Hole also may refer to:

- The Glory Hole, World War I route of attack for the first day of fighting on the Somme
- The Glory Hole, passage under High Bridge, Lincoln, in the United Kingdom
- "The Glory Hole", a Vietnam war story by T. Jeff Williams

== See also ==
- Glory hole (disambiguation)
