= Bell pit =

Primitive method of relatively shallow mining

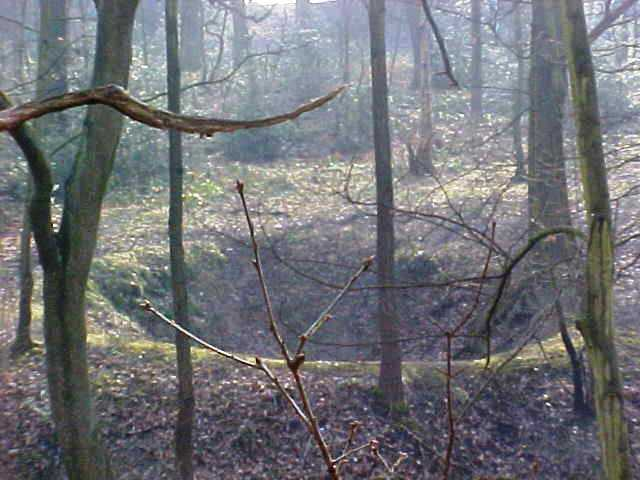
A collapsed bell pit, evidence of early coal mining in Middleton Woods

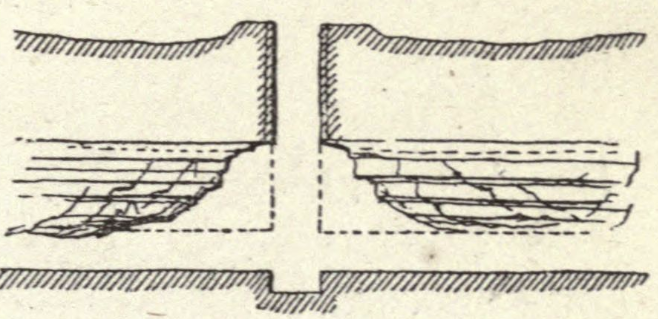
Cross section of a bell pit.

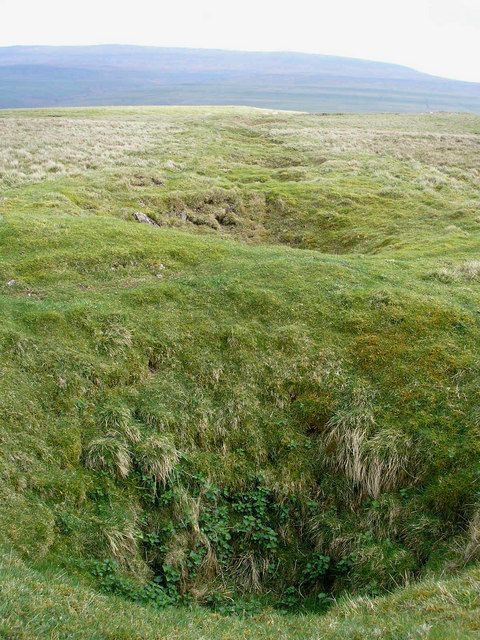
A line of bell pits following a lead seam. These are often mistaken for shake holes.

A bell pit is a primitive method of mining coal, iron ore, or other minerals lying near the surface.

== Operation ==
A shaft is sunk to reach the mineral which is excavated by miners, transported to the surface by a winch, and removed by means of a bucket, much like a well. The bottom of the shaft is enlarged and a sloping roof is created as the desired mineral and surrounding rock is removed – giving its name because the pit in cross section resembles a bell.

Typically, no supports were used, and mining continued outwards until the cavity became too dangerous or collapsed at which point another mine was started, often in close proximity. This type of mine was in use in prehistoric times, the Middle Ages, and a few continued in use until the early 20th century in the region around Ford, Northumberland. Such pits are common at prehistoric flint working sites such as Grime's Graves in Norfolk and also in the coal mining areas of Yorkshire, the Forest of Dean, and Leicestershire.

Bell pits often flooded due to a lack of a drainage system. This, together with the lack of support and the likelihood of collapse, meant they had a limited lifespan. The remains of bell pits can be identified by depressions left when they collapsed. In some places, they will follow a straight line as the seam of mineral is being followed. Bell pits were not an efficient way of extracting minerals as they only partially exploited the resources.

== See also ==
- Drift mining
- Open-pit mining
- Industry and the Eglinton Castle estate
- Glossary of coal mining terminology
