= Wallarah 2 Coal Project =

Proposed mine in New South Wales, Australia

The Wallarah 2 Coal Project (or W2CP) is a proposal by the Korea Resources Corporation or KORES (owned by the South Korean government and other Korean and Japanese mining companies that comprise the Wyong Areas Coal Joint Venture) to construct a longwall mine near Wyong, New South Wales, Australia. The underground mine is now being considered by the NSW Department of Planning. It was previously rejected by the Keneally Government shortly before the 2011 state election.

== Proposal ==
The exploration areas within which the mining proposal is situated were awarded to the Wyong Areas Coal Joint Venture by the NSW State Government in 1995 following a competitive tender. Extensive exploration drilling, geological surveys, environmental investigations, stakeholder consultations and other works costing approximately $80 million were undertaken by the proponents. The proposed mine would have an annual coal production of 4 to 5 million tonnes of export quality thermal coal per year, over 28 years.

The associated coal loader, coal stockpile and rail link would be at least 3 kilometres away from one of the largest urban growth areas on the Central Coast, including the proposed Warnervale town centre.

== Opposition and rejection of previous proposal ==
The proposal was delayed by numerous studies, including an independent review headed by former NSW Liberal leader Kerry Chikarovski, and widespread opposition on the Central Coast with opponents suggesting the project could impact voting at subsequent elections.

The Australian Coal Alliance was formed to oppose the project and has maintained an active public relations campaign against the proposal. It blamed the NSW Labor Party and its supporters to failing to stop the mine.

Former state Labor MP for Wyong David Harris said he was opposed to the mine, adding he was "concerned about the noise and dust impacts on the community and for the future of the Wyong Employment Zone at Warnervale". However, members of the Australian Coal Alliance criticised him for accepting a position as Parliamentary Secretary claiming the position suggested loyalty to the NSW Government, rather than to their campaign.

Before the 2011 state election, the NSW Opposition promised to stop the mine proposal. On the final day of the Keneally Government (the day before the issue of the writs), Minister Tony Kelly announced that the Government had made a decision that the proposal would not go ahead. David Harris attempted to "claim victory" for the proposal rejection but was defeated at the state election.

== See also ==
- Coal in Australia
