= Firedamp whistle =

A firedamp whistle (German: Schlagwetterpfeife) is an instrument for the prophylactic indication of firedamp, flammable gases often present in coal mines.

== History ==
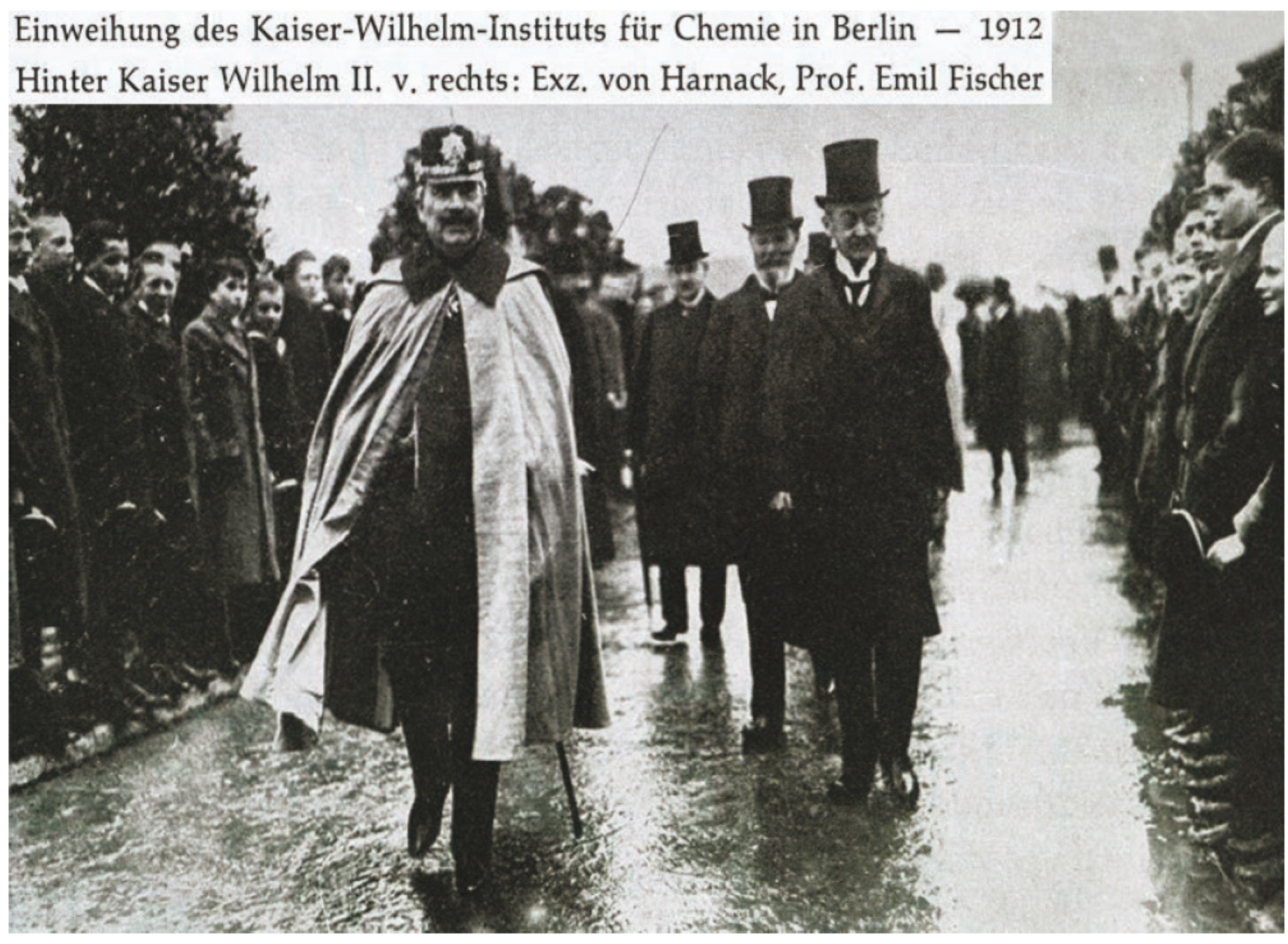
Opening of the Kaiser Wilhelm Institute for Physical Chemistry and Electrochemistry with German Emperor Wilhelm II

The German Emperor Wilhelm II asked Fritz Haber in 1912, shortly after the opening of the Kaiser Wilhelm Institute for Physical Chemistry and Electrochemistry in Berlin, for the construction of a warning system for the presence of firedamp.

Within a year Haber had developed the firedamp whistle and presented it to the emperor in a lecture on 28 October 1913. Haber tried hard to market the device, and eventually signed a contract with the Auergesellschaft. The device did not prevail, since the calibration of the pipes under working conditions in a colliery was not practical.

== Mode of operation ==
The simultaneous use of two equally-tuned pipes, of which one is blown with atmospheric air and the second with another gas, results in two only slightly different tones, called a beat. The function of the methane whistle is based on the fact that the sound when blowing a whistle depends on the speed of sound in the gas. The sound velocities of methane and air differ by about 31%. For a 1% methane-air mixture, the speed of sound is about 1.0031 times as high as in air. If the pipes are tuned to 440 Hz in air, the air-methane pipe has a frequency of 440 Hz × 1.0031 = 441.4 Hz. If two identically tuned pipes are blown by air and an air-methane mixture, the only slightly different tones produce a clearly audible beat. If the gas mixture changes in the resonator, then its resonance spectrum changes. By means of an absorber, interfering constituents of air such as humidity and carbon dioxide are removed. The methane whistle indicated methane levels in the mine air from 1 vol% and above.
