= Glory Hole Park =

Park in Colorado, United States

Coordinates: 39°11′08″N 106°48′57″W

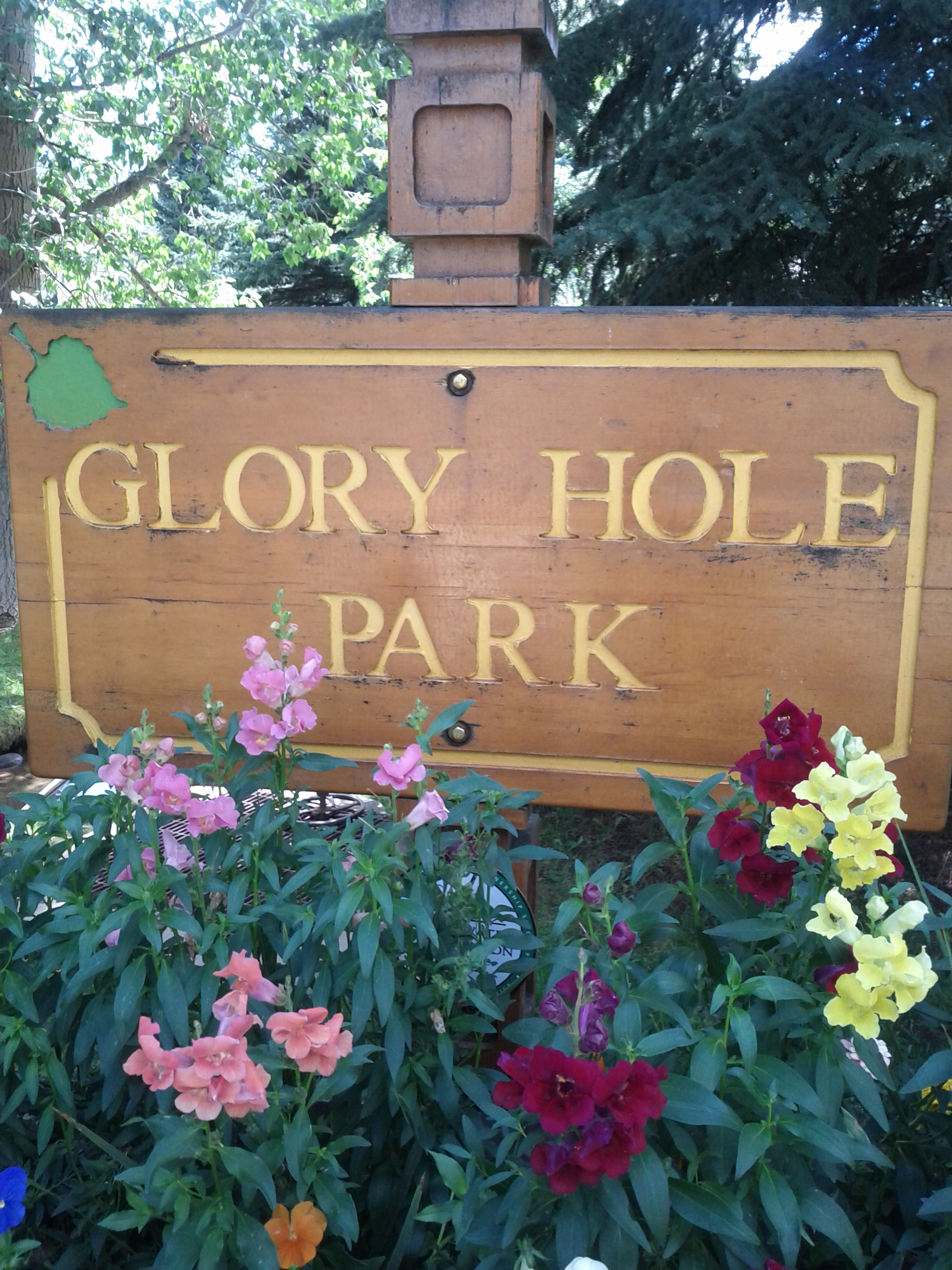
A sign at the entrance

Glory Hole Park is a 1.5-acre (6,100 m^{2}) public park in Aspen, Colorado, United States. It is located at the corner of Original Street and Ute Avenue, atop a spring.

A major mining accident took place on the site of present-day Glory Hole Park in August 1918. A cave-in occurred at the third level of the stopes of the AJ silver mine. The cave-in broke through to the surface, forming a cavity roughly 100 ft (30 m) by 200 ft (61 m) across. The collapse drew in nearby sections of the Colorado Midland Railroad, including two ore-laden freight cars, and caused power lines to fall into the opening. Power had to be shut off before the cars could be removed safely. In the months that followed, crews repaired the water flume and blasted the hole's edges to reach stable bedrock, halting further subsidence.

In 1945, the depression was filled with refuse collected during a citywide cleanup and leveled over. By April 1949, however, the filled pit had become problematic, prompting its closure as a dumping ground. Residential development later surrounded the site, paving the way for its conversion into a public space. The park was designed in the late 1960s by the industrial design engineer Irving Shechter. Shechter won a design competition held in February 1967 with a proposed budget of $5,000. Later that year, the area was formally established as Glory Hole Park.

By 2025, the asphalt trail in Glory Hole Park had become rough and fissured. In September, the city of Aspen announced a three-week project meant to improve the park's pedestrian safety and accessibility to people using wheelchairs and crutches. The project also aims to reconstruct the park's entrance.
