= French ship Glorieux =

At least two ships of the French Navy have been named Glorieux:

- French ship Glorieux (1756) a ship of the line launched in 1756 and captured by the Royal Navy in 1782
- French ship Glorieux a Téméraire-class ship of the line renamed Polonais before launch
