= Glory (sculpture) =

- Artist: Garry R. Bibbs
- Year: 1999
- Type: Bronze and steel
- Dimensions: 24 m × 12 m × 0.30 m (80 ft × 40 ft × 1 ft)
- Location: IUPUI; Indianapolis, Indiana, United States; 39°46′28″N 86°09′58″W

Glory is a sculpture created by American artist Garry R. Bibbs in 1999. The sculpture is installed above the entrance to the J. F. Miller Center, at the corner of West Michigan Street in Indianapolis, Indiana. Glory is made from fabricated steel and bronze. Angels and trumpets are the two distinct images visible within the sculpture. The sculpture is very large, with dimensions of 80 ft x 40 ft x 1 ft. Gibbs signed his name to the sculpture and included a copyright sign.

== Commission ==
The sculpture was commissioned by Joseph F. Miller, founder of the J. F. Miller Center. The dedication date is listed as March 1999. The Center on West Michigan Street used to house the Second Baptist Church, one of the city's oldest African-American Baptist churches, until it moved in 2002. The building was renovated to house offices, as the Miller Center, which commissioned the sculpture.

Bibbs drew inspiration from the Bible's Book of Ezekiel, from African-American heritage and from an African-American medical clinic located nearby.

== Artist ==
Garry R. Bibbs is an associate professor, head of sculpture and director of graduate studies at the University of Kentucky. He received a Ford Foundation Post-Doctoral Fellowship, which allowed him to study with internationally renowned sculptor Richard Hunt, at the School of the Art Institute of Chicago, Illinois. He was recipient of a 1996 Southern Arts Federation, National Endowment for the Arts Visual Arts Fellowship for Outstanding Printmaker in the Southern States. His exhibition history includes showings at the Smithsonian in Washington, D.C., the Raus in Indianapolis, Indiana, the Hertz Gallery in Louisville, Kentucky, the Art Institute of Chicago in Chicago, Illinois, and the Contemporary Arts Center in Cincinnati, Ohio. His works are in the collections of the High Museum in Atlanta, Georgia, Southern Illinois University, Edwardsville, Illinois, ATT Corporation–York City, Brown-Forman Corporation, Commonwealth Insurance, the Brown-Williamson Tobacco Corporation, the Robert Derden Collection, the Richard Hunt Collection, the Louisville City Fire Department and the Living Arts and Science Center in Lexington, Kentucky. Bibbs a member of the Pew Civic Entrepreneur Initiative, a coalition group in Lexington whose goal is to confront and solve issues relevant to the community on race relations and leadership. He received a Bachelor of Science from Kentucky State University and a Master of Fine Arts from the University of Kentucky before his postdoctoral work at the School of the Art Institute of Chicago.

=== Artist statement ===
In his artist's statement for another sculpture, Bibbs wrote, "Through my art, I want to share honesty about my human experiences, my African American heritage and my environment, whether it is good, bad or indifferent. Life is so precious, so it is important that my viewers feel enlightened, uplifted and free. They should be made aware that there is an answer, a power and a glory. So live a good life and be gracious in God’s creative beauty, which we are given to use as we call, the ARTS."

According to Glory-June Greiff, who wrote the book Remembrance, Faith And Fancy, Garry R. Bibbs drew on "the building's past using images of angels and trumpets of Gabriel - or are they from long gone jazz clubs of nearby Indiana Avenue?"

== See also ==
- Aristides Demetrios
- Bert Flugelman
- David Smith (sculptor)
