= Glory, Glory =

"Glory, Glory" is a possible name for several works:

== Songs ==
- "The Battle Hymn of the Republic", an American patriotic anthem written by Julia Ward Howe in 1861
  - To the same tune: "Glory Glory" (association football chant), which has been used notably by British clubs Manchester United, Hibernian, and Tottenham. Was also copied by rugby league outfit South Sydney Rabbitohs.
  - "Glory, Glory" (fight song), sung at American college sporting events
- "Glory, Glory (Lay My Burden Down)", American spiritual song, recorded by many artists (under several titles) since the 20th century
- "Glory! Glory!", by Underworld from Underneath the Radar, 1988

== Films ==
- Glory! Glory!, a 1989 American comedy film
- Glory Glory (film), a South African Western film
