= Glory (1811 ship) =

UK merchant ship (1811–1824)

History

United Kingdom
- Name: Glory
- Port of registry: Quebec (1811–1812); London (1812–1824)
- Builder: William Henry Dockyard, William Henry
- Launched: 19 November 1811
- Fate: Last listed 1824

General characteristics
- Tons burthen: 399, or 405 (bm)
- Armament: 8 × 18-pounder guns "of the new construction"

Glory was launched in Quebec in 1811. She sailed to London in 1812, and was registered there. In 1817, she made a voyage to Bengal, sailing under a licence from the British East India Company (EIC). A voyage transporting convicts to New South Wales followed. She then returned to general trading and was last listed in 1824.

== Career ==
A letter dated 5 May 1812, reported to the Registry in Quebec that Glory had changed her registry to London.

Glory first appeared in Lloyd's Register (LR), in 1812. Captain Pounder sailed for Fort William, India in February 1817.

Year	Master	Owner	Trade	Source
1812	Bell; R.Evans	Bell & Co.	London	LR
1813	R.Evans; Henry	Bell & Co. J. Woodcock & Co.	London–Archangel; London transport	LR
1816	Henry; T.Sansom	J. Woodcock & Co.	London transport London–Quebec	LR
1818	E.Pounder	J. Woodcock & Co.	London–Calcutta; London–Botany Bay	LR

In 1813, the British East India Company (EIC), had lost its monopoly on the trade between India and Britain. British ships were then free to sail to India or the Indian Ocean under a licence from the EIC. Glory, Pounder, master, sailed for Fort William, India in February 1817. She arrived back at Deal from Bengal on 12 January 1818.

Captain Edward Pounder sailed from Sheerness on 18 May 1818, bound for Port Jackson. Glory arrived on 14 September. She had embarked 170 male convicts and she had suffered no convict deaths on her voyage. A lieutenant and 28 men from the 87th Regiment of Foot provided the guard; one soldier died on the voyage of illness. There was also a handful of free settler passengers.

From Port Jackson Glory sailed to Bengal, where she arrived on 1 February 1819. On 10 August, she was off the Cape Verde Islands, on her way to London. On 29 August, she was at 45°48′N 30°10′W. On 24 September, she arrived at Cork, and on 9 October, at Gravesend.

Year	Master	Owner	Trade	Source
1820	E.Pounder	Parker	Cork	LR
1822	E.Pounder	Parker&Co.	London–Honduras	LR
1823	E.Pounder	Parker&Co.	London–America	LR

== Fate ==
Glory was last listed in Lloyd's Register in 1824.
