= Henry Beecher Dierdorff =

American inventor

Henry Beecher Dierdorff (January 29, 1851 in Seville, Ohio – January 26, 1935 in Columbus, Ohio) was an American inventor of mining equipment, most notable for the first successful application of electricity to power mining equipment under the surface of earth.

== Biography ==
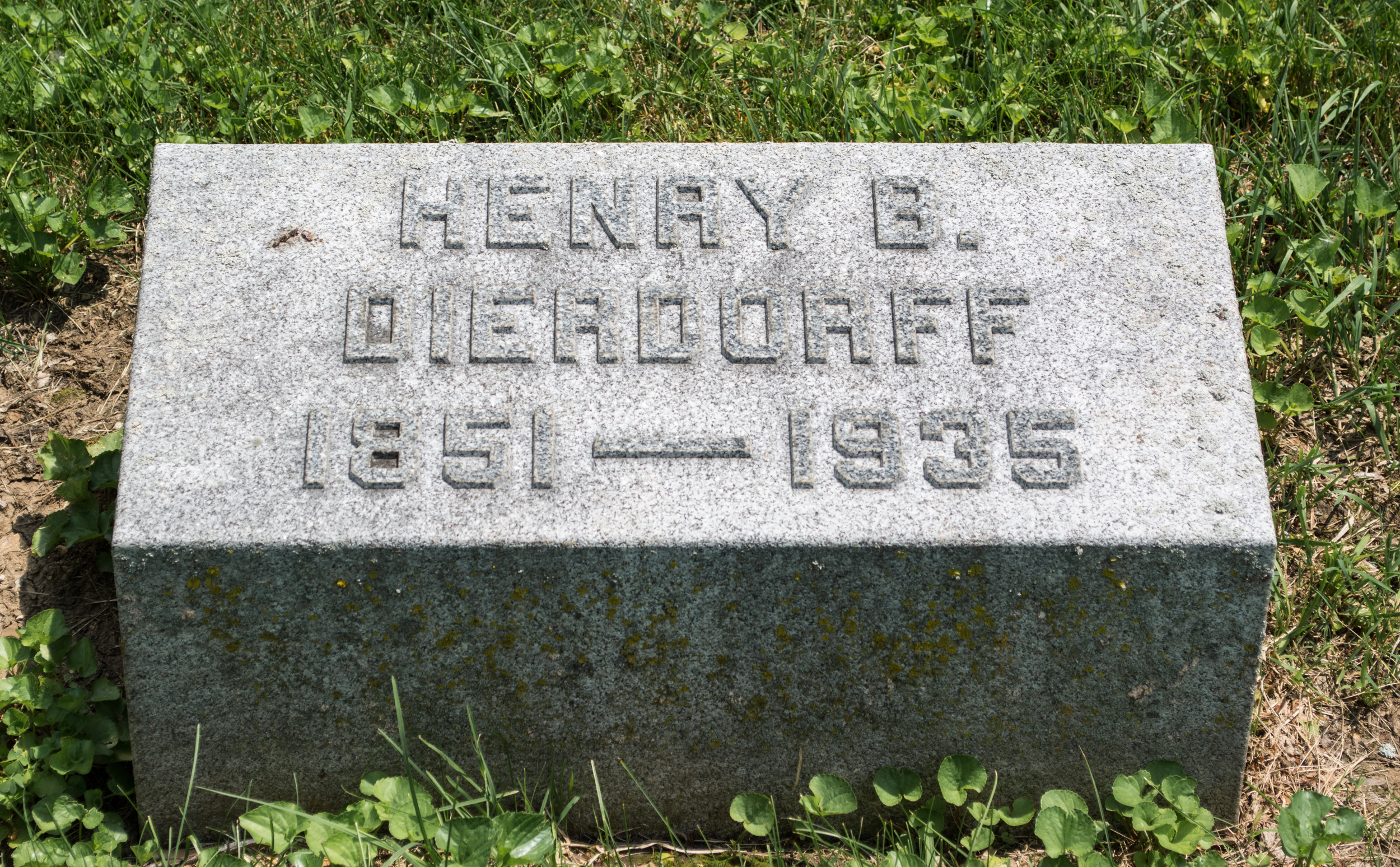
Gravestone

While an engineer with Jeffery Mining and Manufacturing Company (later part of Dresser Industries) of Columbus, Ohio, Dierdorff developed insulation that could be packed around electric motor housings to suppress sparking found on early electrical motors. This allowed the first safe electric seam cutting tool in underground mining. This tool was capable of cutting anthracite coal and was known as the Congo Coal Cutter after its success for the Congo Mining Company, of Corning, Ohio.

Between 1885 and 1909, Dierdorff designed and secured thirty-five patents from the United States Patent Office related to mining and mining safety. One of his most widely used patents involved the development of power systems (spark suppressive) to deliver electricity to miners underground, resulting in the first safe delivery of electric light to miners working underground.

At the time of his retirement from Jeffery, Dierdorff oversaw the company's entire manufacturing facilities and processes.

Dierdorff was born near Seville in Medina County, Ohio in 1851. Dierdorff married twice; first to Charlotte Miller (five children) and then to Hattie Monnette. He died in Columbus, Ohio in 1935 and is buried in Greenlawn Cemetery, Columbus, Ohio.

== Sources ==
- "Jeffery Service" Magazine, March 1935.
- Taylor, William Alexander, Centennial History of Columbus & Franklin County, Ohio, Volume 2, The S. J. Clarke Publishing Company, 1909, Henry Beecher Dierdorff, Page 558.
- The Ohio State Journal, "DEATH CLAIMS H. BEECHER DIERDORFF" January 26, 1935.
- Henry Beecher Dierdorff at Find a Grave
