= French ship Gloire =

Gloire, meaning "glory", has been a popular name for French vessels.

== Naval vessels named Gloire ==
- Gloire (1691), an ordinary galley
- Gloire (1707), a 40-gun frigate
- Gloire (1725), a 46-gun ship of the line
- Gloire (1726), an ordinary galley
- Gloire (1742), a 40-gun ship of the line
- Gloire (1762), a 16-gun corvette
- Gloire (1778), an Iphigénie-class 32-gun frigate. Launched in 1778, she was captured by the British in 1795 and put into service as HMS Gloire until she was sold in 1802.
- Gloire (1797), the Venetian flagship galley Gloria, captured in May 1797.
- Gloire (1801), a corvette
- Gloire (1803–1812), a 44-gun frigate, was captured on 25 September 1806 and was brought into British service as HMS Gloire; she was broken up in 1812.
- Gloire (1811), a 46-gun frigate
- Gloire (1837), a 52-gun frigate
- Gloire (1858–1883), the first ocean-going ironclad battleship in history.
- Gloire (1899–1922), the lead ship of the Gloire-class armoured cruiser.
- Gloire (1933–1958), a La Galissonnière-class cruiser

== Other ships named Gloire ==
- Gloire (1799 ship) was launched at Bayonne in 1799 as an armed merchantman, became a privateer in the Indian Ocean that the British captured in 1801 and named HMS Trincomalee, but then sold in 1803. The French recaptured her in 1803 and recommissioned her as the privateer Émilien, but the British recaptured her in 1807 and recommissioned her as HMS Emilien, before selling her in 1808.

== See also ==
- Gloire de Marie (1917), an auxiliary minesweeper.
- Gloria in Excelsis Deo (1939), an auxiliary patrol boat.
- French ship Glorieux
- French ship Glorieuse
- HMS Glory
