= HMS Glory =

Ten ships of the Royal Navy have been named HMS Glory, or the French variant HMS Gloire:

- HMS Glory (1747) was a 44-gun fifth rate, formerly the French 44-gun ship La Gloire, captured from the French in 1747, and was sold to be broken up in 1763.
- HMS Glory (1763) was a 32-gun fifth rate launched in 1763. She was renamed HMS Apollo in 1774 and was broken up in 1786.
- HMS Glory (1781) was an 8-gun lugger, formerly the French Gloire. She was captured in 1781 and broken up in 1783.
- HMS Glory (1788) was a 98-gun second rate launched in 1788. She was converted to a prison ship in 1809, a powder hulk in 1814, and broken up in 1825.
- HMS Gloire (1795) was the 32-gun French frigate Gloire captured from the French in 1795; she was sold in 1802.
- HMS Gloire (1806) was a 36-gun fifth rate captured from the French in 1806 and broken up in 1812.
- HMS Gloire was a 38-gun fifth rate, previously the French Iphigénie. She was captured in 1814 and taken into service as HMS Palma. She was renamed HMS Gloire later that year and was sold in 1817.
- HMS Glory (1899) was a Canopus-class battleship launched in 1899. She was renamed HMS Crescent in 1920 when she became a depot ship, and was broken up in 1922.
- HMS Glory IV was formerly the Russian cruiser Askold, seized by the British in 1918 and used as a depot ship until she was returned to the Soviet Navy in 1920.
- HMS Glory (R62) was a Colossus-class aircraft carrier launched in 1943 and scrapped in 1961.

== See also ==
- HMS Glorious
- HMS Glorieux
- French ship Gloire
