= Glory hole (petroleum production) =

Sea floor excavation in the offshore petroleum industry

A glory hole in the context of the offshore petroleum industry is an excavation into the sea floor designed to protect the wellhead equipment installed at the surface of a petroleum well from icebergs or pack ice. An economically attractive alternative for exploiting offshore petroleum resources is a floating platform; however, ice can pose a serious hazard to this solution. While floating platforms can be built to withstand ice loading up to a design threshold, for the largest icebergs or the thickest pack ice the only sensible alternative is to move out of the way. Floating platforms can be disconnected from the wellheads in order to allow them to be moved away from threatening ice, but the wellhead equipment is fixed in place and hence vulnerable.

The keel of an iceberg or pack ice can extend far below the surface of the water. If this keel extends deep enough to make contact with the sea floor, it will scour the sea floor as the ice moves with the current. To protect the wellhead equipment from possible scouring, a glory hole is excavated into the sea floor. This excavation must be deep enough to allow adequate clearance between the top of the wellhead equipment and the surrounding sea floor. The resulting glory hole can be either open or cased. A cased glory hole utilizes steel casing as a retaining wall while an open glory hole is simply an excavation.

Due to the cost of excavating individual glory holes, typically each glory hole will contain several wellheads. Locating multiple wellheads within a single glory hole is made possible by the use of directional drilling.

== Etymology ==
The usage of the term glory hole in this context almost certainly is taken from its historical usage in the mining industry to refer to excavations.

== See also ==
- Glory hole (mining)
