= Whitedamp =

Mixture of gases produced by combustion of coal

Whitedamp is a noxious mixture of gases formed by the combustion of coal, usually in an enclosed environment such as a coal mine. The main, most toxic constituent is carbon monoxide, which causes carbon monoxide poisoning. Hydrogen sulfide, also called stinkdamp, may co-occur. Coal frequently starts to burn slowly in mines when it is exposed to the atmosphere; partial combustion produces carbon monoxide. The term is etymologically and practically related to terms for other underground mine gases such as firedamp, blackdamp, stinkdamp, and afterdamp.

== Etymology ==
The meaning of "damp" in this term, while most commonly understood to imply humidity, presents evidence of having been separated from that newer, irrelevant meaning at least by the first decade of the 18th century, where the original relevant meaning of "vapor" derives from a Proto-Germanic origin, dampaz, which gave rise to its immediate English predecessor, the Middle Low German damp (with no record of an Old English intermediary). The proto-Germanic dampaz gave rise to many other cognates, including the Old High German damph, the Old Norse dampi, and the modern German Dampf, the last of which still translates as "vapor".

== Detection ==
Historically, whitedamp (specifically carbon monoxide) was detected by its effect on canaries, who succumb much more quickly than humans. However, there are now gas detectors available; these detect toxic gases at very low levels. The levels of gas detection depend on the gas and methods used. Carbon monoxide detectors are common in homes.

== See also ==
- Firedamp
- Blackdamp
- Stinkdamp
- Afterdamp
- Glossary of coal mining terminology
