= Firedamp =

Flammable gas found in coal mines

Firedamp is any flammable gas, typically coalbed methane, the natural gas that is found in coal mines. It is particularly found in areas where the coal is bituminous. The gas accumulates in pockets in the coal and adjacent strata and, when they are penetrated, the release of the gas can cause explosions. Historically, if such a pocket was highly pressurized, it was termed a "bag of foulness".

== Name ==
Damp is the collective name given to all gases (other than air) found in coal mines in Great Britain and North America.

As well as firedamp, other damps include blackdamp (nonbreathable mixture of carbon dioxide, water vapour and other gases); whitedamp (carbon monoxide and other gases produced by combustion); poisonous, explosive stinkdamp (hydrogen sulfide), with its characteristic rotten-egg odour; and the insidiously lethal afterdamp (carbon monoxide and other gases) which are produced following explosions of firedamp or coal dust.

== Etymology ==
Often hyphenated as fire-damp, this term for a flammable type of underground mine gas in first part derives via the Old English fyr, and from the proto-Germanic fūr for "fire" (the origin of the same word in Dutch and German, with similar original spellings in Old Saxon, Frisian, and Norse, as well as Middle Dutch and Old High German). In the second part, the meaning of "damp" (most commonly understood to imply humidity) presents evidence of having been separated from that newer, irrelevant meaning at least by the first decade of the 18th century, where the original relevant meaning of "vapor" also derives from a Proto-Germanic origin, dampaz, which gave rise to its immediate English predecessor, the Middle Low German damp (with no record of an Old English intermediary). As with the derivation of the first, the proto-Germanic dampaz gave rise to many other cognates, including the Old High German damph, the Old Norse dampi, and the modern German Dampf, the last of which still translates as "vapor".

== Contribution to mine deaths ==
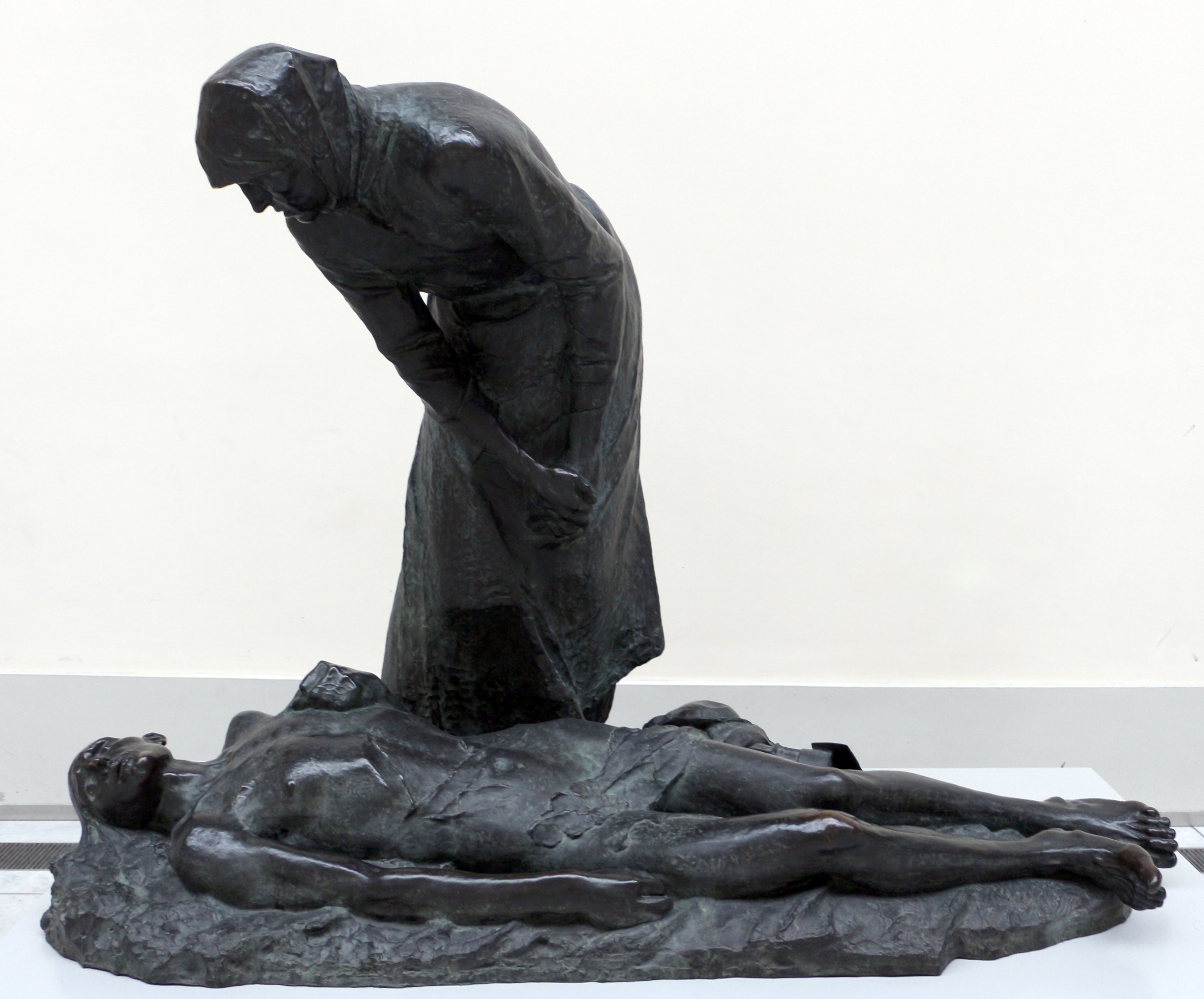
Firedamp (1889) by Constantin Meunier depicts the aftermath of a mining disaster

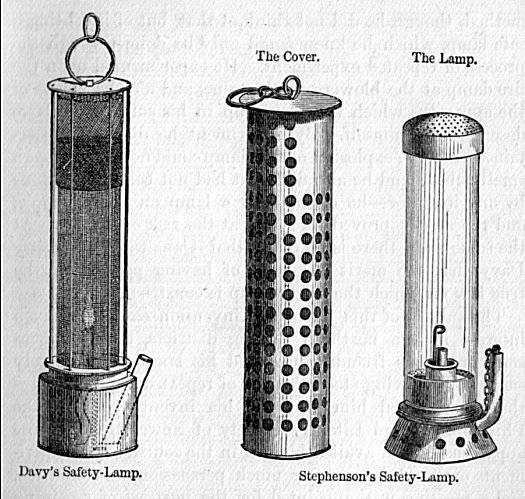
Stephenson's safety lamp shown with Davy's lamp on the left

Firedamp is explosive at concentrations between 4% and 16%, with most explosions occurring at around 10%. It caused many deaths in coal mines before the invention of the Geordie lamp and Davy lamp. Even after the safety lamps were brought into common use, firedamp explosions could still be caused by sparks produced when coal contaminated with pyrites was struck with metal tools. The presence of coal dust in the air increased the risk of explosion with firedamp and could cause explosions even in the absence of firedamp. The Tyneside coal mines in England had the deadly combination of bituminous coal contaminated with pyrites and there was a great number of deaths in accidents caused by firedamp explosions, including 102 dead at Wallsend in 1835.

The problem of firedamp in mines had been brought to the attention of the Royal Society by 1677 and in 1733 James Lowther reported that as a shaft was being sunk for a new pit at Saltom near Whitehaven there had been a major release when a layer of black stone had been broken through into a coal seam. Ignited with a candle, it had given a steady flame "about half a Yard in Diameter, and near two Yards high". The flame being extinguished and a wider penetration through the black stone made, reigniting of the gas gave a bigger flame, a yard in diameter and about three yards high, which was extinguished only with difficulty. The blower was panelled off from the shaft and piped to the surface, where more than two and a half years later it continued as fast as ever, filling a large bladder in a few seconds. The society members elected Sir James Fellow but were unable to come up with any solution nor improve on the assertion (eventually found to be incorrect) of Carlisle Spedding, the author of the paper, that "this sort of Vapour, or damp Air, will not take Fire except by Flame; Sparks do not affect it, and for that Reason it is frequent to use Flint and Steel in Places affected with this sort of Damp, which will give a glimmering Light, that is a great Help to the Workmen in difficult Cases."

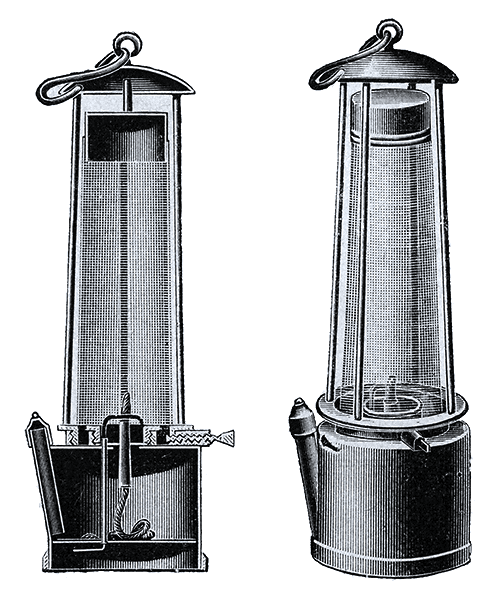
Davy lamp (drawing)

A great step forward in countering the problem of firedamp came when safety lamps, intended to provide illumination whilst being incapable of igniting firedamp, were proposed by both George Stephenson and Humphry Davy in response to accidents such as the Felling mine disaster near Newcastle upon Tyne, which killed 92 people on 25 May 1812. Davy experimented with brass gauze, determining the maximum size of the gaps and the optimum wire thickness to prevent a flame passing through the gauze. If a naked flame was thus enclosed totally by such a gauze, then methane could pass into the lamp and burn safely above the flame. Stephenson's lamp (the "Geordie lamp") worked on a different principle: the flame was enclosed by glass; air access to the flame was through tubes sufficiently narrow that the flame could not burn-back in incoming firedamp and the exiting gases were too low in oxygen to allow the enclosed flame to reach the surrounding atmosphere. Both principles were combined in later versions of safety lamps.

Even after the widespread introduction of the safety lamp, explosions continued because the early lamps were fragile and easily damaged. For example the iron gauze on a Davy lamp needed to lose only one wire to become unsafe. The light was also very poor (compared with a naked flame) and there were continuous attempts to improve the basic design. The height of the cone of burning methane in a flame safety lamp can be used to estimate the concentration of the gas in the local atmosphere. It was not until the 1890s that safe and reliable electric lamps became available in collieries.

The Firedamp whistle was developed by Fritz Haber in 1913, as a prophylactic indicator of firedamp, but calibration in a working colliery ultimately proved impractical.

== See also ==
- Glossary of coal mining terminology
- Abercarn colliery disaster
- Darr Mine disaster
- Gresford disaster
- Maypole Colliery disaster
- Mining accident
- Udston mining disaster
- Stinkdamp
- Afterdamp
- Blackdamp
- Whitedamp
