= Afterdamp =

Toxic gas mixture resulting from coal mining explosion

Afterdamp is the toxic mixture of gases left in a mine following an explosion caused by methane-rich firedamp, which itself can initiate a much larger explosion of coal dust. The term is etymologically and practically related to other terms for underground mine gases—such as firedamp, white damp, and black damp, with afterdamp being composed, rather, primarily by carbon dioxide, carbon monoxide and nitrogen, with highly toxic stinkdamp-constituent hydrogen sulfide possibly also present. However, the high content of carbon monoxide is the component that kills, preferentially combining with haemoglobin in the blood and thus depriving victims of oxygen. Globally, afterdamp has caused many of the casualties in disasters of pit coalfields, including British, such as the Senghenydd colliery disaster. Such disasters continue to afflict working mines, for instance in mainland China.

== Etymology ==
The meaning of "damp" in this term, while most commonly understood to imply humidity, presents evidence of having been separated from that newer, irrelevant meaning at least by the first decade of the 18th century, where the original relevant meaning of "vapor" derives from a Proto-Germanic origin, dampaz, which gave rise to its immediate English predecessor, the Middle Low German damp (with no record of an Old English intermediary). The proto-Germanic dampaz gave rise to many other cognates, including the Old High German damph, the Old Norse dampi, and the modern German Dampf, the last of which still translates as "vapor".

== Detection ==
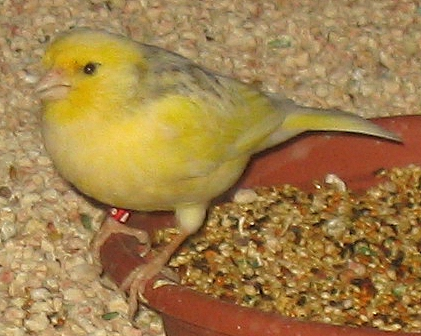
Domestic canary

Animal sentinels, such as mice or canaries, are more sensitive to carbon monoxide than humans, so will give a warning to miners. Canaries were introduced into British collieries in the 1890s by John Scott Haldane, the noted physiologist. Gas detectors are available now which detect toxic gases such as carbon monoxide at very low levels. They are widely available to protect domestic premises. The levels of gas detection depend on the methods used.

== See also ==
- Firedamp
- Blackdamp
- Stinkdamp
- Whitedamp
- Glossary of coal mining terminology
