= Blackdamp =

Mixture of gases present in mines and confined spaces

Blackdamp (also known as stythe or choke damp), sometimes found in enclosed environments such as mines, sewers, wells, tunnels, and ships' holds, is an asphyxiant, reducing the available oxygen content of air to a level incapable of sustaining human or animal life. It is not a single gas but a mixture of unbreathable gases left after oxygen is removed from the air; it typically consists of nitrogen, carbon dioxide and water vapour. The term is etymologically and practically related to terms for other underground mine gases such as fire damp, white damp, stink damp, and afterdamp.

== Etymology ==
The meaning of "damp" in this term, while nowadays understood to imply humidity, presents evidence of having been separated from this meaning at least by the first decade of the 18th century; the original meaning of "vapor" derives from a Proto-Germanic origin, dampaz, which gave rise to its immediate English predecessor, the Middle Low German damp (with no record of an Old English intermediary). The proto-Germanic dampaz gave rise to many other cognates, including the Old High German damph, the Old Norse dampi, and the modern German Dampf, the last of which still translates as "vapor".

== History ==
Choke damp was documented in 37 BC by Varro, who stated "Those who keep their grain under ground in the pits which they call sirus should remove the grain some time after the pits are opened, as it is dangerous to enter them immediately, some people have been suffocated while doing so."

== Sources ==
Blackdamp is encountered in enclosed environments such as mines, sewers, wells, tunnels and ships' holds. It occurs with particular frequency in abandoned or poorly ventilated coal mines. Coal, once exposed to the air of a mine, naturally begins absorbing oxygen and exuding carbon dioxide and water vapor. The amount of blackdamp exuded by a mine varies based on a number of factors, including the temperature (coal releases more carbon dioxide in the warmer months), the amount of exposed coal, and the type of coal, although all mines with exposed coal produce gas.

== Hazards ==
Blackdamp is considered a particularly pernicious type of damp (especially in a historical context), due to its omnipresence where exposed coal is found, and slow onset of symptoms. It produces no obvious odor (unlike the hydrogen sulfide of stinkdamp), is constantly being reintroduced to the air (instead of being released in pockets from actively mined sections), and does not require combustion in order to be released (unlike whitedamp or afterdamp). Many of the initial symptoms of oxygen deprivation (dizziness, light-headedness, drowsiness and poor coordination) are relatively innocuous and can easily be mistaken for simple fatigue, given the physically strenuous job of coal mining. The time between the onset of initial symptoms and the start of frank asphyxiation (and rapid unconsciousness) can be as short as seconds. Consequently, if the warning signs are missed, a large number of miners can be rapidly incapacitated in the same short period of time, leaving no one to summon help.

In addition to the danger inside the mine, blackdamp can be "exhaled" in large quantities from mines (especially long-abandoned coal mines with few outlets for escaping gas) during sudden changes in atmospheric pressure, potentially causing asphyxiation on the surface.

== Disasters ==
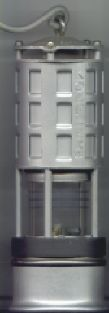
Modern flame safety lamp used in mines, manufactured by Koehler

The gas mixture has been responsible for many deaths among underground workers, especially miners—for example, the 1862 Hartley Colliery disaster, when 204 men and boys were trapped when the beam of an engine suddenly broke and fell down the single shaft, damaging the ventilation system and blocking it with debris. Despite rescuers' efforts, they could not be reached before they suffocated in the blackdamp atmosphere.

== Detection and countermeasures ==
Historically, the domestic canary, a conveniently small bird very susceptible to toxic gases, was used as an early warning against carbon monoxide.

In active mining operations, the threat from blackdamp is addressed with proper mineshaft ventilation as well as various detection methods, typically using miners' safety lamps or hand-held electronic gas detectors. The safety lamp is merely a specially designed lantern with a flame that is designed to automatically extinguish itself when oxygen concentration drops to approximately 18% (normal atmospheric concentration of oxygen is c. 21%), before it becomes dangerously low. This detection threshold gives miners an unmistakable warning and allows them to escape before any potentially incapacitating effects are felt.

== See also ==
- Mazuku
- Firedamp
- Whitedamp
- Stinkdamp
- Afterdamp
- Glossary of coal mining terminology
