= Coal-mining region =

Basin with coal deposits

Coal mining regions are significant resource extraction industries in many parts of the world. They provide a large amount of the fossil fuel energy in the world economy.

The People's Republic of China is the largest producer of coal in the world, while Australia is the largest coal exporter. Countries with the largest proven black coal reserves are the United States (250.2 billion tonnes), Russia (160.3 billion tonnes), Australia (147.4 billion tonnes), China (138.8 billion tonnes) and India (101.3 billion tonnes).

A coal-mining region is a region in which coal mining is a significant economic activity. Coal-mining regions are often associated with the social, cultural and environmental impact of coal mining.

== Africa ==
=== South Africa ===
In South Africa coal is mined in several regions, mainly in the East Rand around Witbank, in the Vaal valley around the Vaal Triangle, the Waterberg in the Limpopo Province and at Dundee and Newcastle in northern KwaZulu Natal. South Africa is currently the leading African coal producer.

== Asia ==
=== China ===
China is currently the world's largest coal miner, and it is also the largest consumer of coal in the world. China’s coal output has continued to increase and its production capacity has expanded at an unprecedented rate, with an annual increase in production of 200 million tonnes on average. In 2012, the total output of coal reached 3.66 billion tonnes. However, based on China’s existing coal mining technologies, this level of output greatly exceeds the sustainable coal production capacity in terms of resources, the environment, and safety. Behind this huge production statistic are excessive waste of coal resources, a large number of casualties among workers, and serious damage to water resources and the environment. These problems are the basis of resistance for the continued development of China’s coal industry.

=== India ===
India has some of the largest reserves of coal in the world (approx. 267 billion tonnes). The energy derived from coal in India is about twice that of energy derived from oil, whereas worldwide, energy derived from coal is about 30% less than energy derived from oil.

The top producing states are:

- Chhattisgarh
- Orissa - see Talcher in Angul district
- Jharkhand

Other notable coal-mining areas include:

- Singareni collieries in Khammam district, Telangana
- Chirimiri Coalfield And Hasdeo coalfield in Koriya District, Chhattisgarh
- Jharia mines in Dhanbad district, Jharkhand
- Nagpur and Chandrapur district, Maharashtra
- Raniganj in Bardhaman district, West Bengal
- Neyveli lignite mines in Cuddalore district, Tamil Nadu
- Singrauli Coalfield and Umaria Coalfield in Madhya Pradesh
- Jowai, Garo Hills in Meghalaya

=== Mongolia ===
Mongolia has proven reserves of 12.2 billion tons of coal including 2 billion tons of coking coal and 10.1 billion tons of thermal coal. Mongolia is estimated to have potential coal reserves of some 100 billion metric tonnes. While Mongolia's output is approximately only 5 million tonnes of coal per year, it will grow significantly given its proximity to China.

=== Philippines ===
Coal mining in the Philippines has a long history dating back to the 1800s during the Spanish colonization of the islands. The Philippines consumes more coal than it can produce and coal is the main source of electricity. 20% of the country's coal supply is used by the cement industry (in 2005).

As of September 31, 2005, the in situ coal reserves of the Philippines amounts to 458 million metric tons which is about 18% of the country's total coal resource potential amounting 2.53 billion metric tons (2.49 billion long tons).

Semirara Mining and Power Corporation is the largest coal producer in the country whose primary mine is in Semirara Island. The company accounts for 92% of the country's coal production according to the Department of Energy.

=== Russia ===
Russia is divided into European Russia and Asian Russia. This article talks about both.

Russia is currently the fifth largest producer of coal, and has the second largest reserves, estimated at 175 billion. The majority of its coal is located east of the Ural Mountains in Siberia. By 1999 approximately a third of coal mining business was privatized. Since then, the industry has concentrated in hands of few companies - coking coal producers were integrated with steel makers, and two national leaders in steam coal emerged. Russian coal miners have recently campaigned for improvements in their working conditions, leading to some reform. Mechel controls the Southern Kuzbass Coal Company in Kuznetsk, the Elga Coal Field in the Sakha Republic with 2.2 billion metric tons of reserves of coal, and the Neryungrinsky coal mine at Neryungri in the Sakha Republic. Other coal producing regions include the Pechora basin of brown coal in northern European Russia, the Kansk-Achinsk basin with total reserves 600 billion tons of lignite centered on Kansk in southern Krasnoyarsk Krai, Tunguska coal basin in eastern Siberia located between the Khatanga River to the Trans-Siberian Railway and between the Yenisei and Lena rivers, and the Lena coal basin which is mainly in the Sakha Republic with some in Krasnoyarsk Krai.

== Europe ==
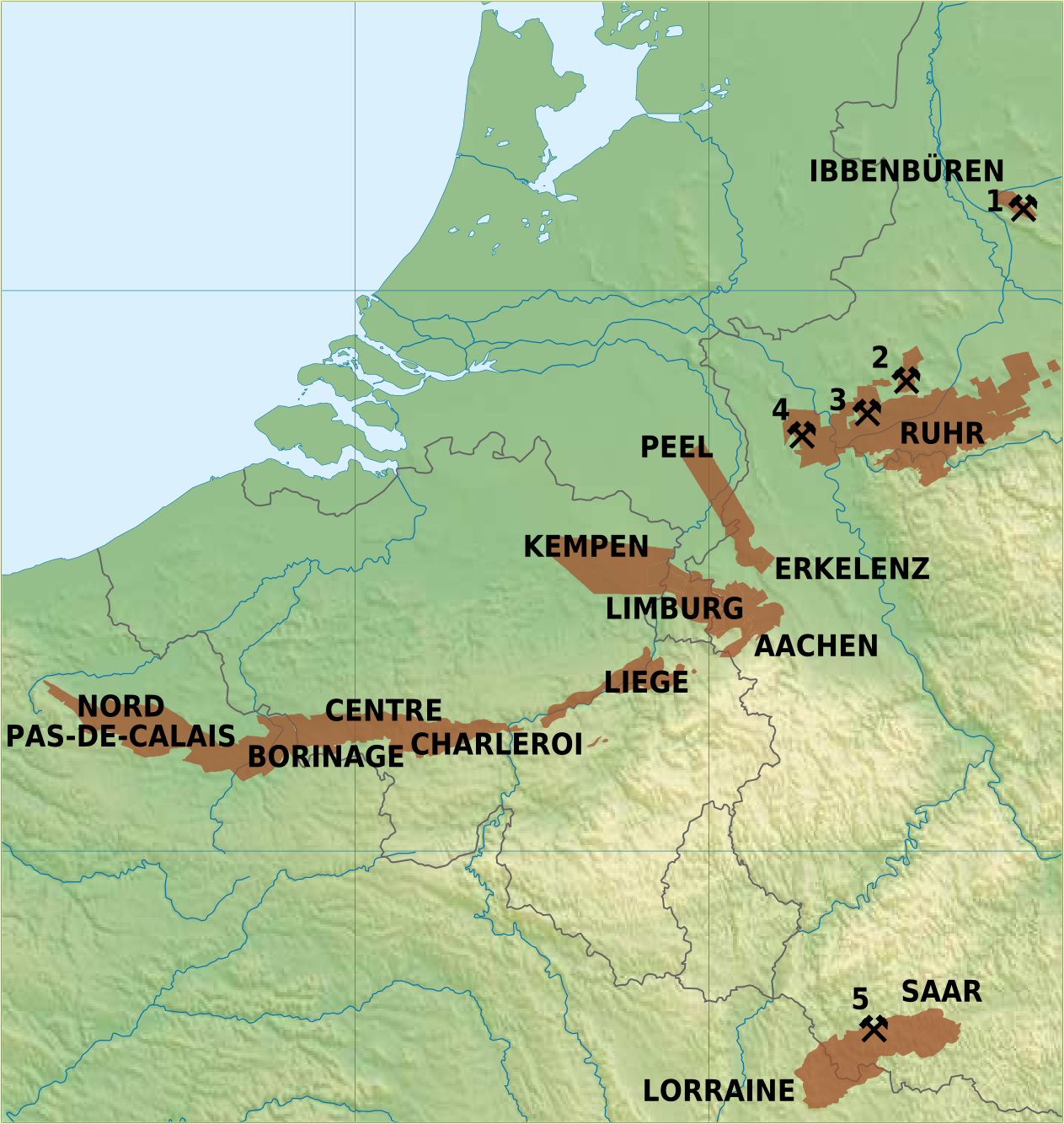
Coalfields of Germany, Belgium, The Netherlands and Northern France

=== Belgium ===
The sillon industriel contains the former coal-mining area, Pays Noir, or "Black Country." It runs across Wallonia, passing from Dour, in Borinage, in the west, to Verviers in the east, through Mons, La Louvière, Charleroi, Namur, Huy, and Liège, following the valleys of the rivers Haine, Sambre, Meuse and Vesdre. It is also known as the "Sambre and Meuse valley", or the "Haine-Sambre-Meuse-Vesdre valley", or the "dorsale wallonne."

=== Bosnia and Herzegovina ===
The major coal mining basins in Bosnia and Herzegovina are the Tuzla Basin with the Kreka and Đurđevik mines and the Zenica Basin with the adjacent Kakanj, Novi Travnik and Gračanica. There are also substantial reserves of coal in Sanski Most, Ugljevik, Gacko and Stanari.

=== France ===
Coal-mining regions of France.

Nord-Pas de Calais Mining Basin, Loire coal mining basin and Saar-Warndt coal mining basin were the major coal-mining regions.

=== Germany ===
The Ruhr Area in North Rhine-Westphalia, Lower Lusatia, and the Central Germany lignite mining area are some of the coal-mining regions. End of 2010 there were five operating hard coal mines in Germany: 1: Bergwerk Ibbenbüren, Ibbenbüren, 2: Zeche Auguste Viktoria, Marl, 3: Bergwerk Prosper-Haniel, Bottrop, 4: Bergwerk West, Kamp Lintfort, 5: Bergwerk Saar, Saarlouis.

Germany's last operating black coal mine, Prosper-Haniel, closed on December 21, 2018, leaving only lignites mines in operation, such as the Hambach surface mine.

=== Netherlands ===
Limburg was a coal-mining region until 1973; See mining in Limburg

=== Poland ===
Silesia in Poland and Czech Republic has more working coal miners than the rest of the European Union combined.

=== Romania ===
The Jiu Valley is a coal-mining region.

=== Serbia ===
Kolubara and Kostolac are coal mining regions. The Resavica region near the Resava River is an underground coal-mining region.

=== Spain ===
There are large coal deposits in Asturias and León which helped fuel the Industrial Revolution in Spain; these have mostly been exhausted.

=== Ukraine ===
Donbas, Volyn, and Halychyna are coal-mining regions.

=== United Kingdom ===
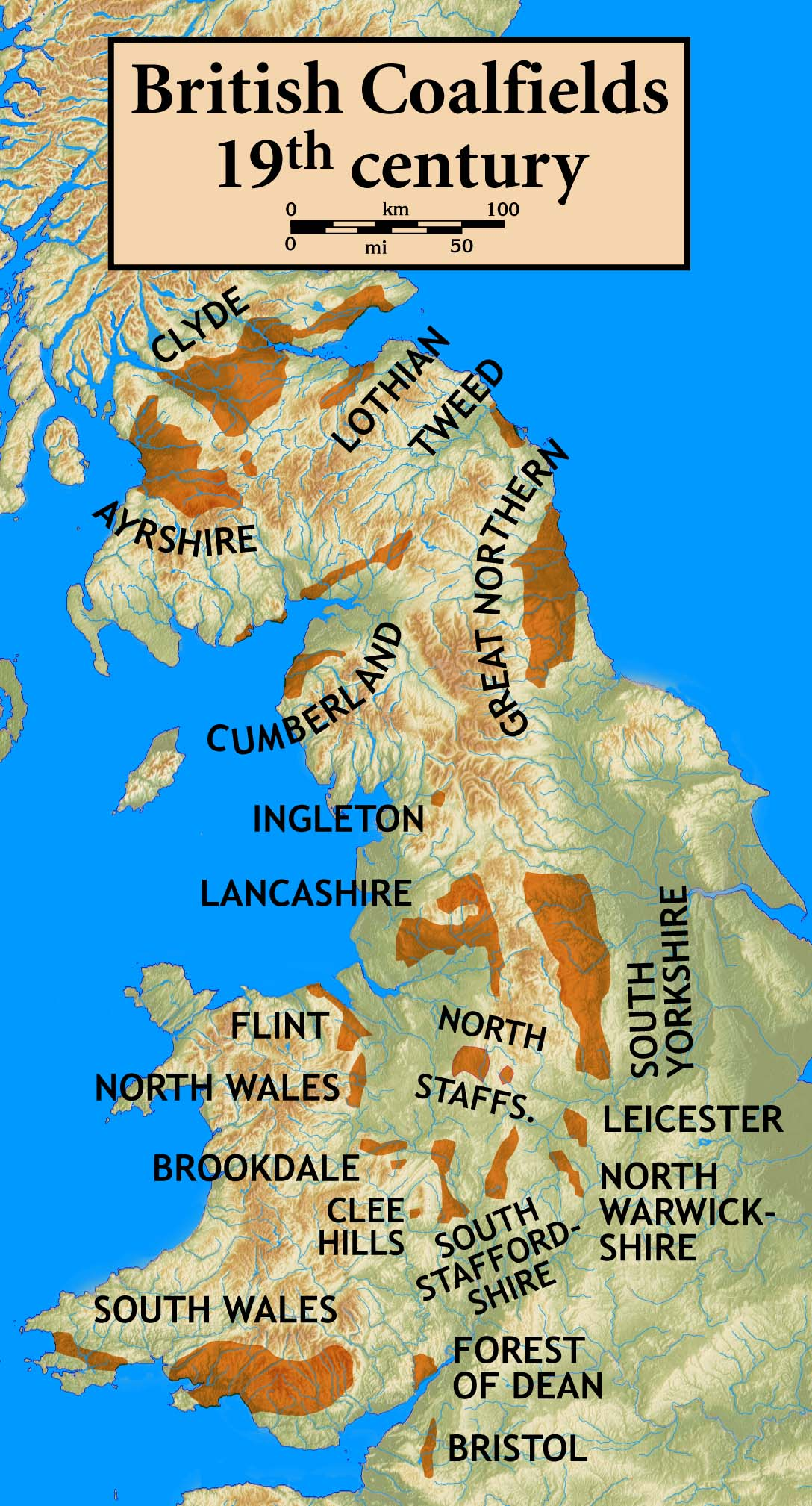

Britain had major coal-mining activity in the past, but since the 1980s coal mining has been in decline due to the increased use of natural gas in power stations and cheaper imports. Very few working coal mines and open-cast quarries now exist in Britain.

==== England ====
The West Midlands region, which covers the western part of the English Midlands. The West Midlands conurbation is the name given to the large conurbation in the region that includes the cities of Birmingham and Wolverhampton. The "Black Country" is a loosely defined area of the English West Midlands which includes the north and west of Birmingham and the south and east of Wolverhampton, famous for its coal mines (especially in Staffordshire), its coal coking operations, and other heavy industry, including iron foundries and steel mills that used local coal to fire their furnaces, all of which produced a level of air pollution that had few equals anywhere in the world.

The Kent coalfield in Kent in South East England also had coal mining operations. In South West England, Somerset was the location of the Somerset coalfields until 1973. Yorkshire in northern England also was formerly home to major coal mining operations.

==== Wales ====
The South Wales coalfield provided a large amount of Welsh coal.

== North America ==
=== Canada ===
Canada holds 78 billion tonnes of coal, primarily bituminous and sub-bituminous, though Saskatchewan holds significant reserves of lignite coal. The Elk Valley, located in the southeast corner of British Columbia, is host to one of the world's largest deposits of hard coking coal. Five mines are operated by the Teck mining company in this area.

=== United States ===
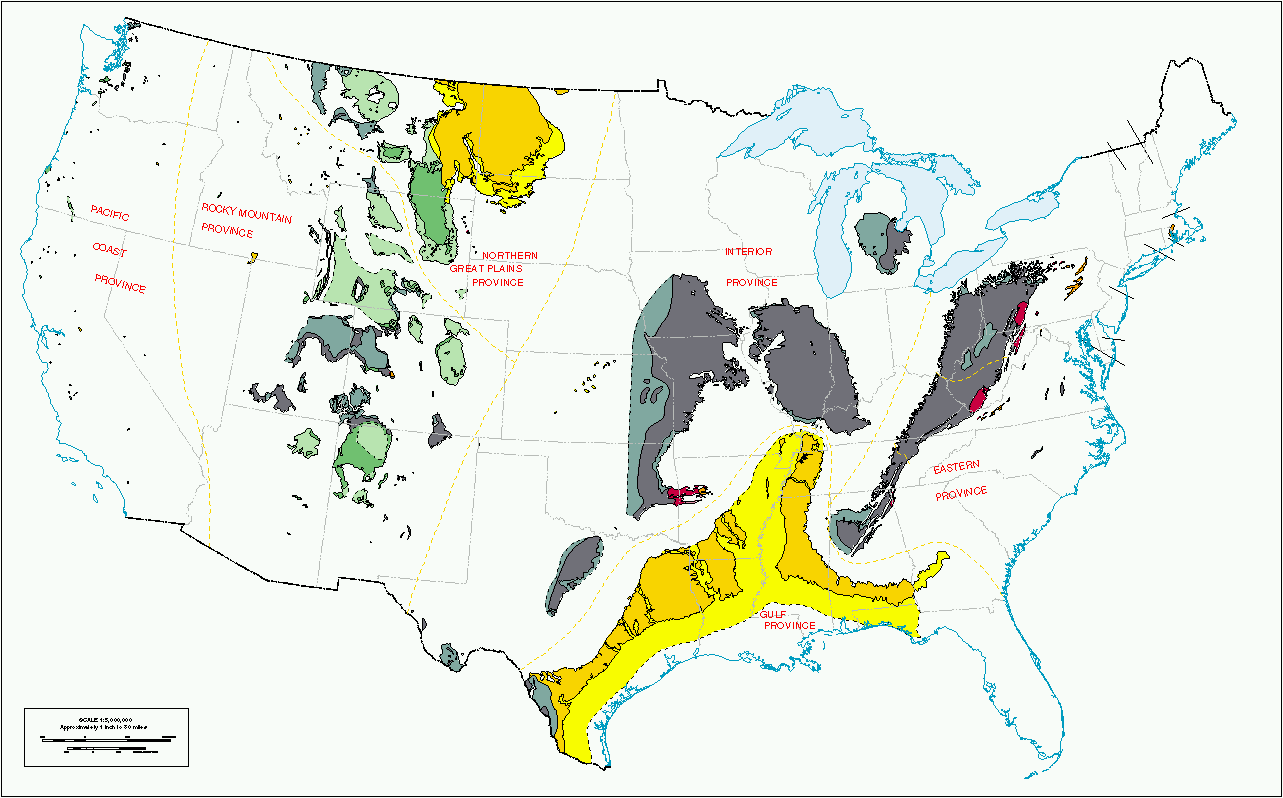
Coal regions of the United States

Coal mining in the United States has historically had economic and cultural dominance in regions such as the Allegheny Mountains and Appalachian Mountains, where it was a major part of identity and traditions. The replacement of workers by mechanization has had major consequences for the industry and for the people it affects.

Coal is mined in the Appalachian Mountains region, and the Midwest. Most coal now produced in the United States is mined in western surface mines, especially in Wyoming's Powder River Basin. A surface mining method often used in the Appalachians is mountaintop removal mining.

The states with the largest recoverable coal reserves are, in descending order, Wyoming, West Virginia, Illinois, and Montana. The largest single mine in the United States is the North Antelope Rochelle Mine near Gillette, Wyoming; it produces more coal annually than many states. In 2009, it alone produced over 100 million tons of coal, and has plans to produce 130 million ton in 2012 more than 23 other coal producing states including Pennsylvania.

Areas with significant coal mining activities include:

- Coal Region of Pennsylvania - Boasting the largest known deposits of anthracite coal in the world, this region is in Northeastern Pennsylvania, in the central Appalachian Mountains comprising Lackawanna, Luzerne, Columbia, Carbon, Schuylkill, Northumberland, and the extreme northeast corner of Dauphin counties. Major population centers include Scranton, Wilkes-Barre, and Pottsville
- West Virginia - see economy of West Virginia
- Eastern Mountain Coal Fields and Western Coal Fields of Kentucky
- Southern Illinois Coal Fields, including the Harrisburg Coal Field
- Colorado - including Denver Basin. - (see Coal mining in Colorado)
- Powder River Basin - (see Coal mining in Wyoming)
- Raton Basin

== Oceania ==
=== Australia ===
Australia contains 76 billion tonnes of coal reserves, or approximately 8 percent of known worldwide deposits. Australian coal deposits include both lignite (brown coal) and black coal. The premier producing areas for Australian coal are the Bowen Basin in the state of Queensland, the Hunter Valley in New South Wales, and the Latrobe Valley in Victoria.

== See also ==
- Company town
- History of coal mining
- List of coalfields
- Trade Union
- Upper Silesian Coal Basin
