= Coal mining in Wyoming =

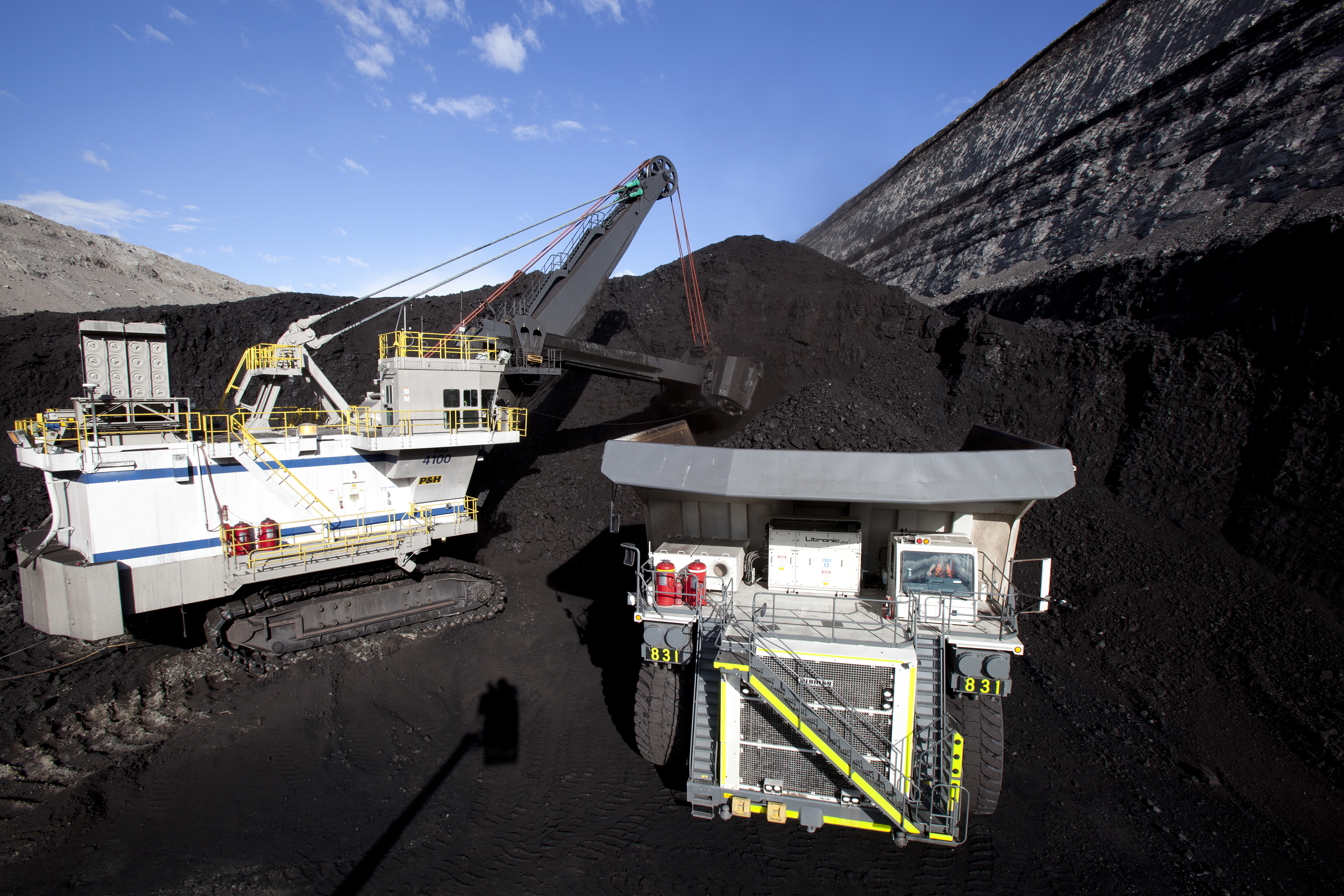
A P&H 4100 shovel loads coal into a haul truck at the North Antelope Rochelle Mine.

Coal mining in Wyoming has long been a significant part of the state's economy. Wyoming has been the largest producer of coal in the United States since 1986, and in 2018, coal mines employed approximately 1% of the state's population. In 2013, there were 17 active coal mines in Wyoming, which produced 388 million short tons, 39 percent of all the coal mined in the US, and more than three times the production of second-place West Virginia. Market forces, including the low price of natural gas from the fracking boom—coal's main competition—contributed to the steep drop in coal production in the 2000s as electricity generation switched from coal to gas.

== History ==
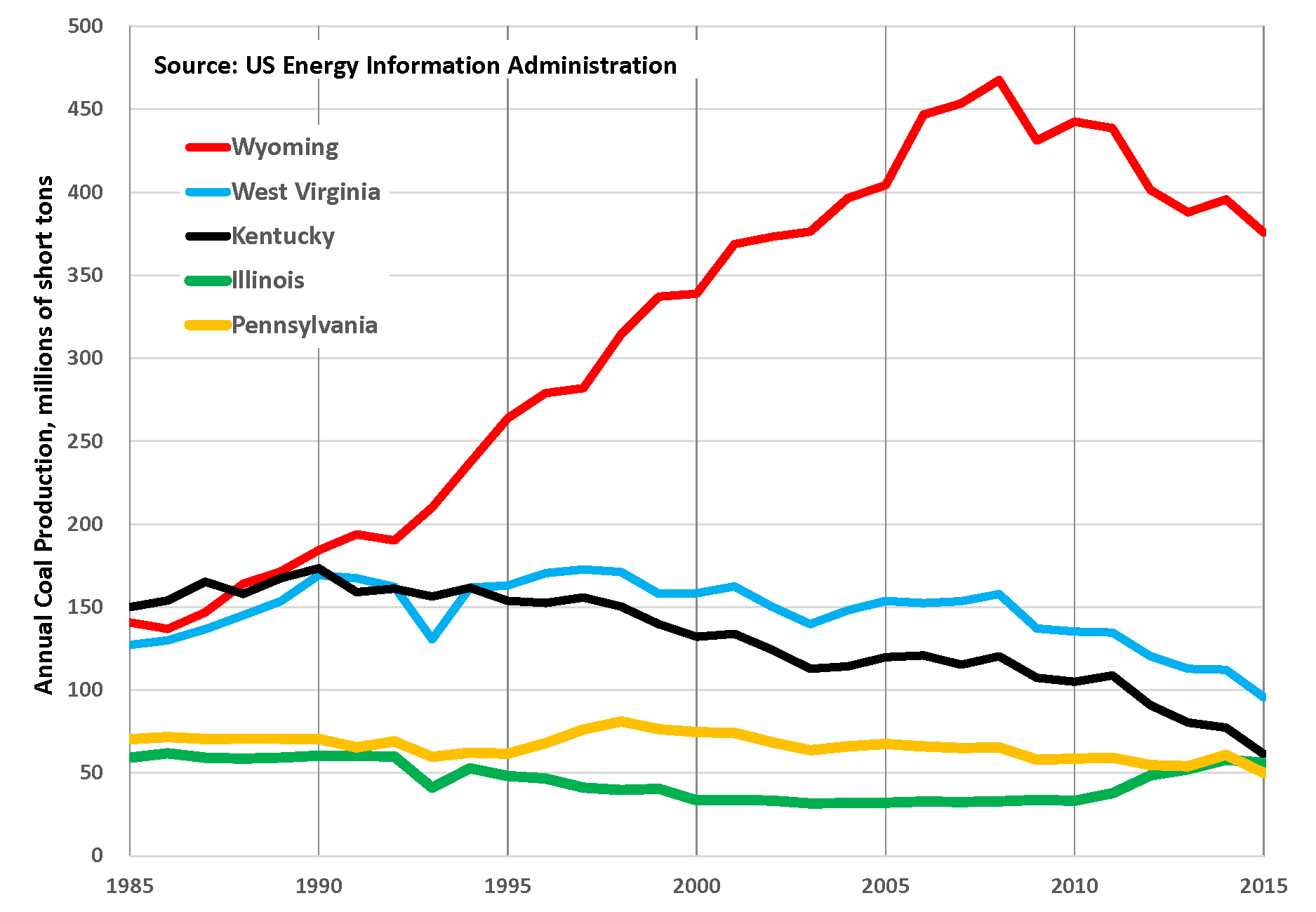
Coal production trends in the top 5 US coal states, 1985-2015, data from US Energy Information Administration

In 1868, the Union Pacific Railroad opened the first coal mine in Carbon County, and the county was named for its extensive coal deposits.

In 2011 Wyoming's coal mines employed 7,000 people; a high was reached in 1981 when 38,500 Wyomingites were recorded as being employed in the mining industry.

Most of Wyoming's coal mines are in the Powder River Basin of northeastern Wyoming, especially in Campbell County. More than 88% of the state's coal production was contributed by mines in the northeast in 1996.

Five ports in Washington and Oregon are considering building export terminals to ship coal to Asia, the coal would come from Wyoming and Montana and be shipped to the Northwest via train. Wyoming has 42 billion tons of reserve recoverable coal, and 1.4 trillion tons total that could become a reserve in the future. Most of the coal from Wyoming is sub-bituminous coal which burns at around 8400–8800 BTUs per pound. The sulphur content of Wyoming coal is quite low, which is important since sulphur dioxide emissions cause acid rain.

After the shale gas boom, economics became stressed for coal, and companies like Peabody filed for Chapter 11 bankruptcy protection in 2016.

== Market forces ==
At peak production in 2008, 468 million short tons of coal were mined in Wyoming, and the coal-mining industry employed 6,827 people. By 2015, Wyoming annual production had declined 20 percent, to 376 million short tons, and the industry employed 6,635 people.

The price of natural gas fell as production increased dramatically during the shale gas boom from 2007 onward, as advances in technology such as the more efficient horizontal drilling and hydraulic fracturing. In electricity generation, one of the major users of coal in the United States, the increased use of natural gas led to a decrease in the demand for coal.

== Use ==
Coal power provided 42.7 TWh of Wyoming electricity in 2016, compared to 3.8 TWh for the second largest (wind).

Almost all Wyoming coal is consumed in the United States, In 2015, out of 376 million short tons of coal mined in Wyoming, 52,400 tons were exported, less than one-tenth of one percent. Wyoming coal is shipped out of Wyoming for use in 28 states, from Oregon and Washington on the Pacific coast, to New York and Maryland on the Atlantic coast. As of 2015, the top five states consuming Wyoming coal, other than Wyoming itself, are: Texas, Illinois, Missouri, Wisconsin, and Iowa, Together, these five states consume more than half the coal shipped out of Wyoming.

== Industry structure ==
The five largest extractors of coal in Wyoming (in terms of 2015 annual production) are:

- Powder River Coal Co., 109.3 million short tons
- Thunder Basin Coal Co. LLC, 107.3 million short tons
- Cloud Peak Energy, 58.0 million short tons
- Alpha Coal West, Inc., 38.0 million short tons (company acquired by Contura Energy in 2016)
- Peabody Energy, 26.6 million short tons

== Disasters ==
On June 30, 1903 coal gas ignited in the Chimney Springs mine, killing 169 of the miners. In 1908, the same mine exploded again, trapping 18 miners inside. The state mine inspector and 40 other men entered the mine to rescue the miners, while the men were at work trying to rescue the miners, another explosion occurred, killing all 59 of those inside.

== See also ==
- Black Thunder Coal Mine
- North Antelope Rochelle Mine
