= Jacobs Ranch Mine =

Open-pit coal mine

- Location in Wyoming
- Location: Wyoming, United States; 43°44′52″N 105°16′49″W
- Products: Coal (38,100,000 tons per annum)
- Company: Rio Tinto Energy America (Rio Tinto Group)

Jacobs Ranch Mine is a large open-pit coal mine located 15 miles southeast of Wright, Wyoming in the coal-rich Powder River Basin. In 2007, the mine produced 38.1 million short tons of coal, making it the fourth-largest coal mine by production in the United States.

== Information ==
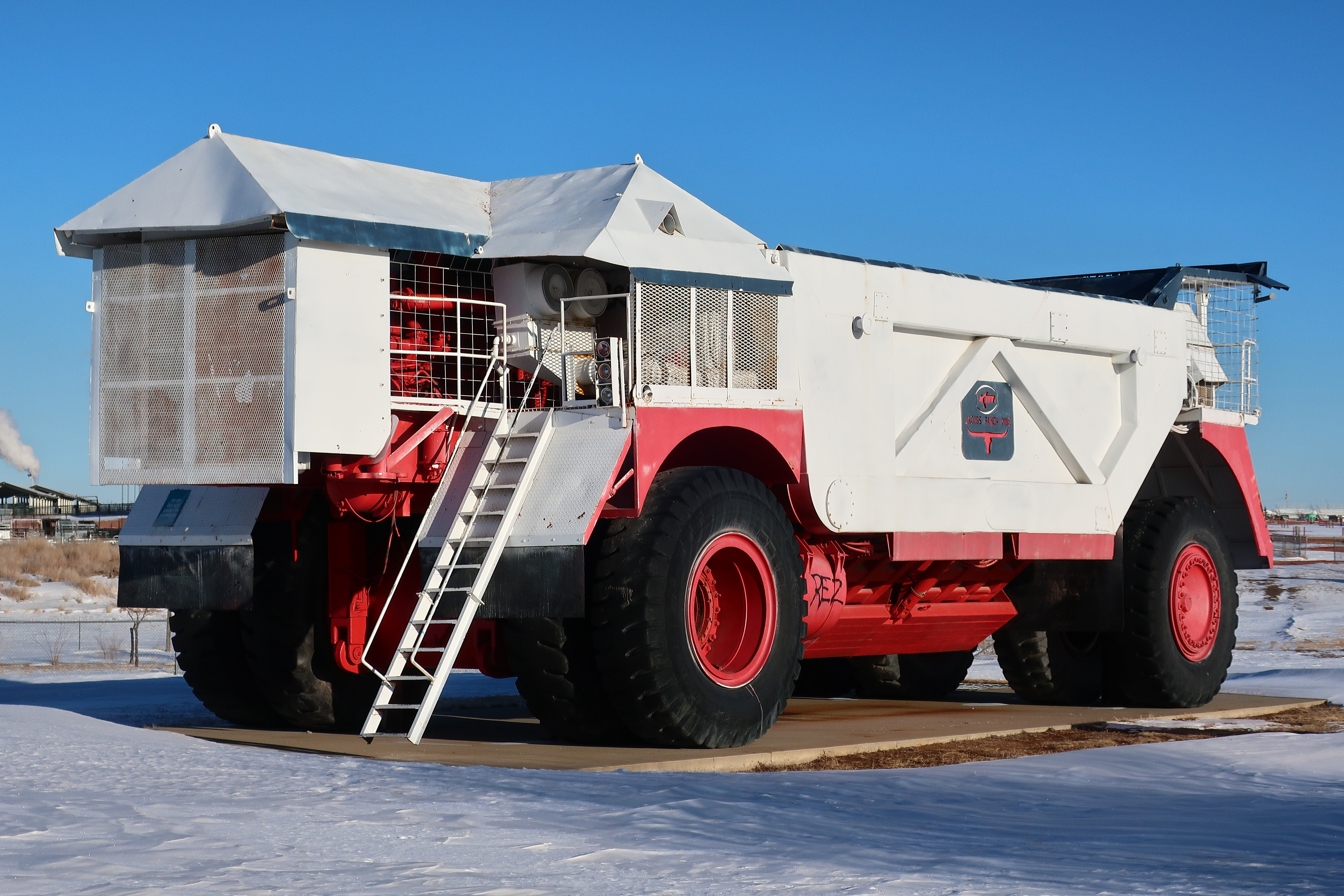
This Unit Rig BD30HD haul truck was assembled at Jacobs Ranch Mine and operated for 20,000 hours hauling 10 million tons of coal. It is now on display at the outdoor Energy Equipment Exhibit museum in Gillette, Wyoming.

Until 2009, the Jacobs Ranch Mine was owned by Rio Tinto Energy America, an American-based subsidiary of the international mining giant Rio Tinto Group. In early 2009, Rio Tinto reached an agreement to sell the Jacobs Ranch mine to Arch Coal for $761 million.
