= Louis Theophiel Duerinck =

American businessman (1929-2008)

- Born: August 1929; Chicago
- Died: November 9, 2008 (aged 79); Naples, Florida
- Occupation: Railroad executive
- Known for: Helping C&NW enter Powder River Basin

Louis Theophiel Duerinck (August 1929 – November 9, 2008) was an executive with the Chicago and North Western Transportation Company (C&NW). He is best known for leading the lawsuit that allowed the railroad to access the Powder River Basin.

Duerinck was born to Belgian immigrants in Chicago, grew up in Riverside, and graduated from Fenwick High School in 1947. He then went to the University of Notre Dame for just one year, and finished getting both his Bachelor's and law degrees from DePaul University.

From 1952 to 1955, Duerinck was a lieutenant in the United States Army Judge Advocate General's Corps stationed at Fort Sheridan.

In 1956 Duerinck was hired as a commerce lawyer for the New York Central Railroad in Chicago. He served in the same capacity for the C&NW beginning in 1965.

During the 1970s and 1980s, Duerinck was Senior Vice President of Law and Real Estate. His most notable accomplishment was a 10-year litigation against the Burlington Northern Railroad for trackage rights into the Powder River Basin.

Duerinck retired in 1989. He moved to Glen Ellyn, Illinois in 2007 and died in 2008.
