= Cordero Rojo Mine =

Coal mining complex in Wyoming, US

Cordero Rojo
- Location in Wyoming

Location
- Location: Wyoming, United States; 44°06′07″N 105°25′05″W

Production
- Products: Coal

History
- Opened: 1976

Owner
- Website: https://navenergy.com/cordero-rojo/
- Acquired: 2019

The Cordero Rojo Mine is a coal mining complex located in the state of Wyoming in the United States, in the coal-rich Powder River Basin. The mine is of open pit construction and employs several dragline excavators. Two coal-processing facilities are located on-site, and crushed coal is shipped by rail to electric utility customers in the south and west of the United States. The mine employs between 430 and 540 people.

The mining complex is wholly owned by Navajo Transitional Energy Company, who acquired the mine at bankruptcy auction in 2019. Previously, the mine was owned by Cloud Peak Energy who acquired the mine in 2010 from Rio Tinto Energy America.

The mine was formerly owned by the mining company Rio Tinto Group, thru its subsidiary Rio Tinto Energy America. It was formed in 1997 from the consolidation of two previously existing mines, the Cordero mine (purchased by Rio Tinto in 1993) and the Caballo Rojo mine (purchased in 1997). The mine produced between 34 and 36 million tons of coal per year in the years 2004 to 2006, over 40 million tons of coal in 2007, and 22.8 million tons in 2015, making the Cordero Rojo the fourth-largest producer of coal in the United States.
