= Rio Tinto Energy America =

- Industry: Coal Mining
- Predecessor: Kennecott Energy
- Founded: 1993; 33 years ago
- Defunct: December 2010
- Fate: Acquired by Cloud Peak Energy
- Headquarters: Gillette, Wyoming, United States

Rio Tinto Energy America (RTEA) was a wholly owned American subsidiary of the England and Australia-based mining giant, the Rio Tinto Group, headquartered in Gillette, Wyoming, United States. The company, previously known as Kennecott Energy after another of Rio Tinto's American subsidiaries, was formed in 1993 when Rio Tinto purchased NERCO and placed that company's Spring Creek coal mine and Antelope coal mine under the RTEA umbrella. Subsequent acquisitions included the Cordero Mining Company, the Colowyo Coal Company, and the Jacobs Ranch coal mine. RTEA operated four mines in Wyoming and Montana, supplying fuel for the generation of approximately 6% of the United States' electricity consumption. The RTEA mines were spun off to Cloud Peak Energy in 2010.

== History ==
In November 2007, Rio Tinto Group announced that it would try to divest RTEA and its assets. As a first step in that effort, Rio Tinto agreed in March 2009 to sell the Jacobs Ranch coal mine to Arch Coal for a sum of $761 million.

In December 2010, Rio Tinto announced that it had succeeded in "100 per cent divestment of its equity holdings in Cloud Peak Energy Inc. through a fully exercised over allotment in connection with a recently announced secondary offering." Cloud Peak Energy stated that the result of the divestment was that Cloud Peak Energy Resources LLC "is now a wholly owned subsidiary of Cloud Peak Energy Inc."

Dow Jones reported that "Cloud Peak will use proceeds from the IPO [initial public offering] to buy 52 per cent of the Rio Tinto's assets it operates and Rio Tinto will own the rest." The write service also reported that early in November Standard & Poor's Ratings Services "assigned Cloud Peak a junk rating of BB minus, three steps below investment grade, citing its need for more reserves among potential risks."
