= Cloud Peak Energy =

American coal mining company

Cloud Peak Energy Inc.
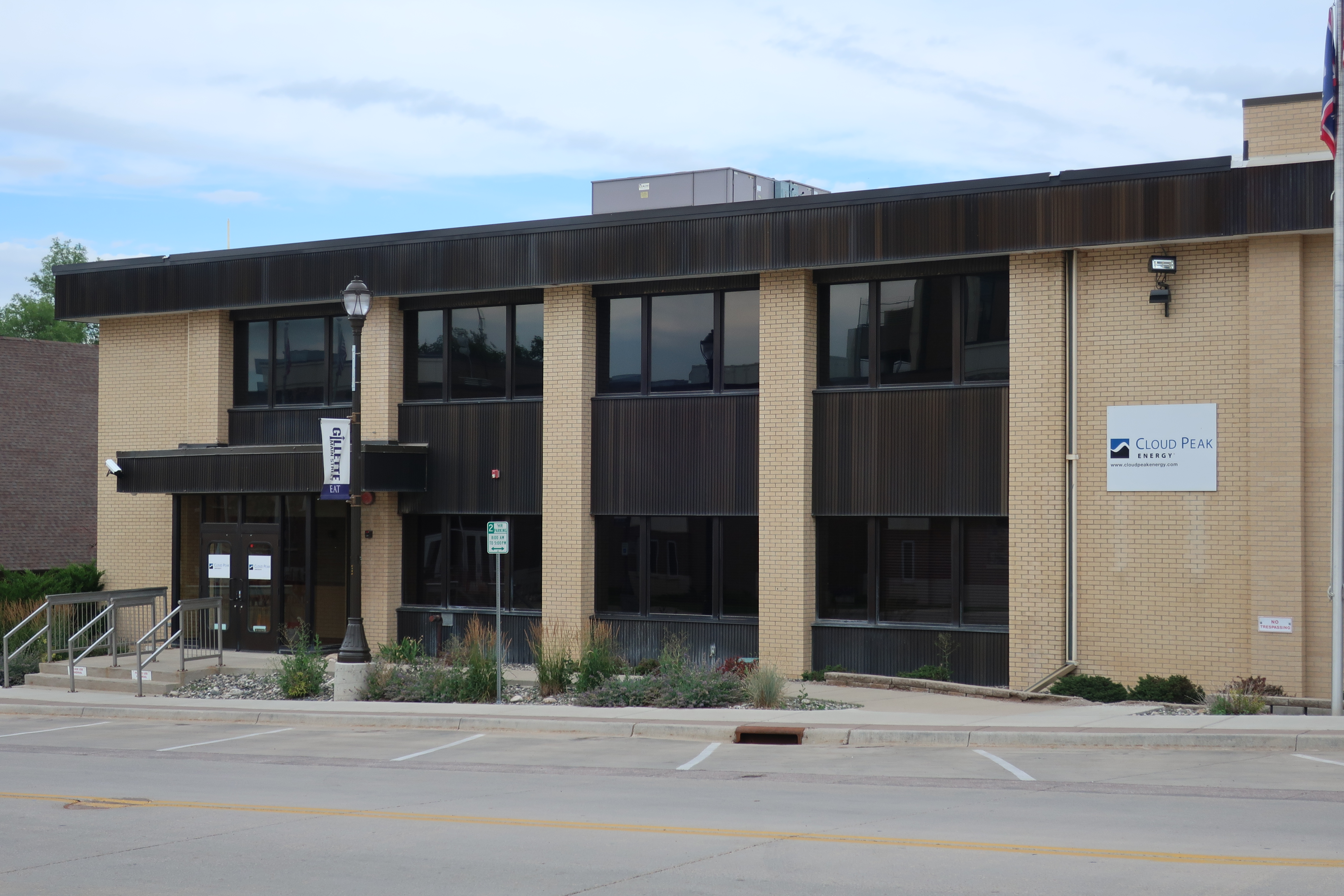
- Cloud Peak Energy headquarters in Gillette, Wyoming
- Type: Public
- Traded as: OTCID Basic: CLDPQ
- Founded: 2009; 17 years ago
- Headquarters: Gillette, United States
- Number of employees: 1200

Cloud Peak Energy Inc. is a company headquartered in Gillette, Wyoming, which mines coal in the Powder River Basin. The company was formed as a corporate spin-off from Rio Tinto Energy America in 2009. In its 2009 Annual Report Rio Tinto stated that it held a 48.3% stake in Cloud Peak Energy and its directly owned mines. Cloud Peak Energy also has a 50% stake in the Decker Coal Company, which operates the Decker Mine in Montana.

According to The Guardian, Cloud Peak Energy Inc was responsible for 0.1% of global industrial greenhouse gas emissions from 1988 to 2015.

In May 2019, Cloud Peak Energy filed for bankruptcy. An analyst pointed to severe declines in demand for Powder River coal from markets in East Asia and the United States.

== Operations ==
The firm operates three open pit mines from thick deposits in Wyoming and Montana.

== Crow Nation ==
The firm has contracted with the Crow Nation to mine 20 million tons of coal annually on its reservation for shipment by rail to coal terminals in the Pacific Northwest for shipment to Asia. The project is called the Big Metal Project after a legendary Crow chief. Big Metals Coal is a wholly owned subsidiary of Cloud Peak. The facilities of Cloud Peak's Spring Creek Mine are located directly to the east of the reservation and will be available for the use of Big Metal.

== Funding of climate change denial ==
Documents that have become public after the bankruptcy show that the company has funded several organizations that are known for spreading climate change denial. Among them are the Institute for Energy Research, a think tank that denies the scientific consensus on climate change and opposes renewable energy, the Center for Consumer Freedom, the pro-fossil American Legislative Exchange Council, which says that climate change is uncertain, the Montana Policy Institute which claims that earth is cooling, Koch-funded Americans for Prosperity, dark-money-groups such as Crossroads GPS and several other groups and organizations. In the past Cloud Peak Energy has denied any ties to the climate denial movement. For example, Richard Reavey, a vice president for government and public affairs, has stated Cloud Peak Energy “has never fought climate change — never fought it, never denied it or funded anyone who does.”
