= Pumpkin Buttes =

Highest point
- Elevation: 6,050 ft (1,840 m)
- Prominence: 1,000 ft (300 m)
- Listing: National Natural Landmark
- Coordinates: 43°43′25″N 105°52′13″W

Geography
- Location: Campbell and Johnson counties, Wyoming, U.S.
- Parent range: Powder River Basin
- Topo map: USGS Pumpkin Buttes

Geology
- Rock age: Eocene / Oligocene
- Mountain type: Mesa / Butte
- Rock type(s): Wasatch Formation, White River Formation

The Pumpkin Buttes are situated in southwestern Campbell County and eastern Johnson County, Wyoming, approximately 40 miles southwest of Gillette. The group consists of North Butte, South Butte, North Middle Butte, and South Middle Butte, along with a smaller fifth butte. North Butte is the highest point in the Powder River Basin, reaching an elevation of 6,050 feet. The buttes are all on private land, except Middle Butte, which is owned by the Bureau of Land Management, but is landlocked.

== Geology ==
The buttes are erosional remnants of Tertiary-aged sediment that once filled the entire Powder River Basin. Roughly 50 million years ago, the basin was a lush, subtropical environment filled with swamps and rivers. Rivers and creeks flowing from the Big Horn Mountains to the west deposited silt and sand in thick layers. During the Oligocene epoch, massive volcanic eruptions in the western U.S. (including the Absaroka Range) blanketed the area in thick volcanic ash. Over time, the vast majority of these sediments were washed away by wind and water. The Pumpkin Buttes remain because they are capped by a 30-to-50-foot layer of the White River Formation. This capstone is made of tougher, coarse-grained sandstone and volcanic tuff that protected the softer underlying Wasatch Formation from eroding away.

== Natural resources ==
Pumpkin Buttes were the location of Wyoming's first discovery of uranium. In 1951, a geologist by the name of J.D. Love found the element in the basin and proved his theory that it could be leached from the layers of sediment. With this discovery, the area began to be mined in the 1950s. Uranium is traditionally mined in pits (see Uranium mining in Wyoming), however here, it is extracted by using in-situ recovery, or by pumping water through the sandstone. As the Pumpkin Buttes are in the Powder River Basin, they are also part of a larger coal, oil, and natural gas extraction zone. Oil is produced from deep Cretaceous-age sandstone.

=== The Pumpkin Buttes War ===
After the discovery of uranium, prospectors fled to the region, disrupting ranching. The Atomic Energy Commission attempted to open 50,000 acres of land to prospecting in November 1955. Ranchers in the region banded together and formed the Pumpkin Buttes Protective Association. They put up roadblocks, posted no trespassing signs, and patrolled their borders with firearms to keep prospectors away. Then Governor Milward Simpson considered mobilizing the National Guard after tensions reached a near boiling point. The outcome of the war was a split-estate system, in which one party (the rancher) owned the surface rights, while the other party (the miners) owned the mineral rights.

== Name ==
The Buttes are named for their iron-rich rocks at the base, which are orange in color. Native Americans, particularly the Sioux, called them Wa-ga-mu Paha (Gourd Hills) because they used the gourd-shaped rocks in spiritual ceremonies. The round, pumpkin-shaped iron concretions found at the base were considered "sacred stones" and were often used in medicine bundles and religious ceremonies. The Sioux, Cheyenne, and Arapahoe, used the buttes as a landmark. Later, the buttes served as a strategic lookout for the U.S. Army and a hideout for outlaws like "Big Nose" George Parrot and his gang after their train robbery attempts and the killing of two lawmen at Elk Mountain in 1878. The buttes provided a natural fortress where horses could graze while the gang remained hidden from posse view. In 1976, the Pumpkin Buttes were designated as a National Natural Landmark due to their unique geological structure and their role as a scenic island in the midst of the high plains.
