= Unit Rig =

American manufacturer of haul trucks

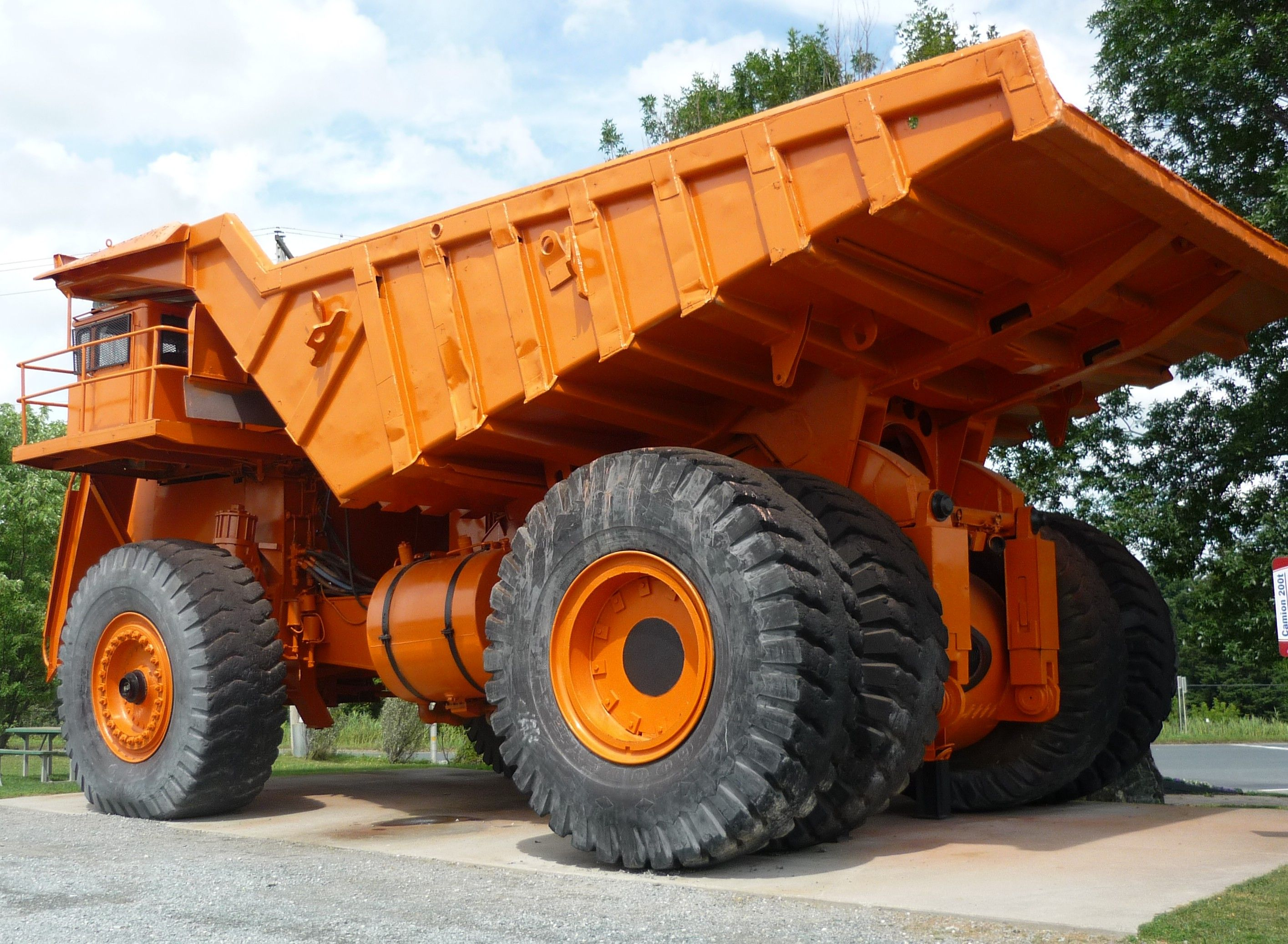
Lectra Haul (M200) giant mining truck in Asbestos, Quebec

Unit Rig was a manufacturer of haul trucks, sold under the brand name Lectra Haul.

== History ==
Unit Rig was founded in 1935 by Hugh S. Chancey and two partners, Jerry R. Underwood and William C. Guier, who formed a partnership to build a rotary drill rig for oil field work that was more mobile than existing designs. The group based the company in Tulsa, Oklahoma. By 1947, the partnership between the men was beginning to break down when Underwood died, leaving Chancey and Guier as the remaining partners. Guier eventually took control of Unit Rig and in 1951 sold it to Kenneth W. Davis, who already had several oil-field related businesses under the parent company name of Kendavis Industries International.

During the 1950s, Unit Rig began to diversify its products away from the limited oil-field products and looked towards mining products to utilize their manufacturing facilities. R. G. LeTourneau had already adapted compact electric drive wheels to construction machinery with great success, prompting Unit Rig to investigate the possibility of building a truck and finding a suitable client to take the finished machine.

By 1960, the M-64 prototype truck was completed using General Electric drive systems and featuring special Goodyear low-pressure tires for the suspension. This truck was not a success; however, Unit Rig went on to be a very successful maker of off-highway dump trucks sold under the brand name of Lectra Haul (due to their electric drive system).

In the 1970s, a large order for M200 trucks was received, to be shipped to the USSR. At that time, the US government did not allow trade with the Soviet Union. The company negotiated a deal with the Canadian government, allowing shipment from Canada, providing the company could verify the use of 40% Canadian materials and labor. The trucks required large quantities of steel, the majority of which was purchased from Canadian companies, and shipped to the Tulsa plant for fabrication and machining. Final assembly was done in Canada. The M200 utilized a diesel engine to generate power for the GE electric wheel motors. The wheel motors were the most expensive component of the M200. In 1976 the wheel motors cost $64,000 apiece, which equates to approximately $500,000 each in today's dollars.

Lectra Haul was bought by Terex, then Bucyrus Erie, who were in turn bought out by Caterpillar Inc. around June 2011.

Unit Rig trucks enjoyed a reputation for a simplified customer friendly design with very little requirement of parts during operation. A large fleet of Unit Rig trucks were sold in countries falling in Arctic circle and they proved to be survivor. Their solid rock like performance forced competitors to spend huge resources on R&D to match the performance in not only in sub zero but in sub Saharan hot environment. Unit Rig had just 4 engineers to design whole new trucks and a small but very experienced support group. In early 90s, Unit Rig brought in the first truck that had design intent for a min 8000 hours operation per year and successfully proved it. 8000 hours of operation means an availability over 92%.

Unit Rig launched industry's first AC drive 150T (MT3300AC) truck with GE Invertex drive followed by 240T AC (MT4400AC) truck. Both trucks wrote new chapters in TCO - Total Cost of Ownership which is an indicator of life time expenses made by a client on parts, fuel and Capex.

In 1998, Unit Rig executed the mining industry's largest single order for supply of 160 trucks to Coal India Limited.

== Products ==
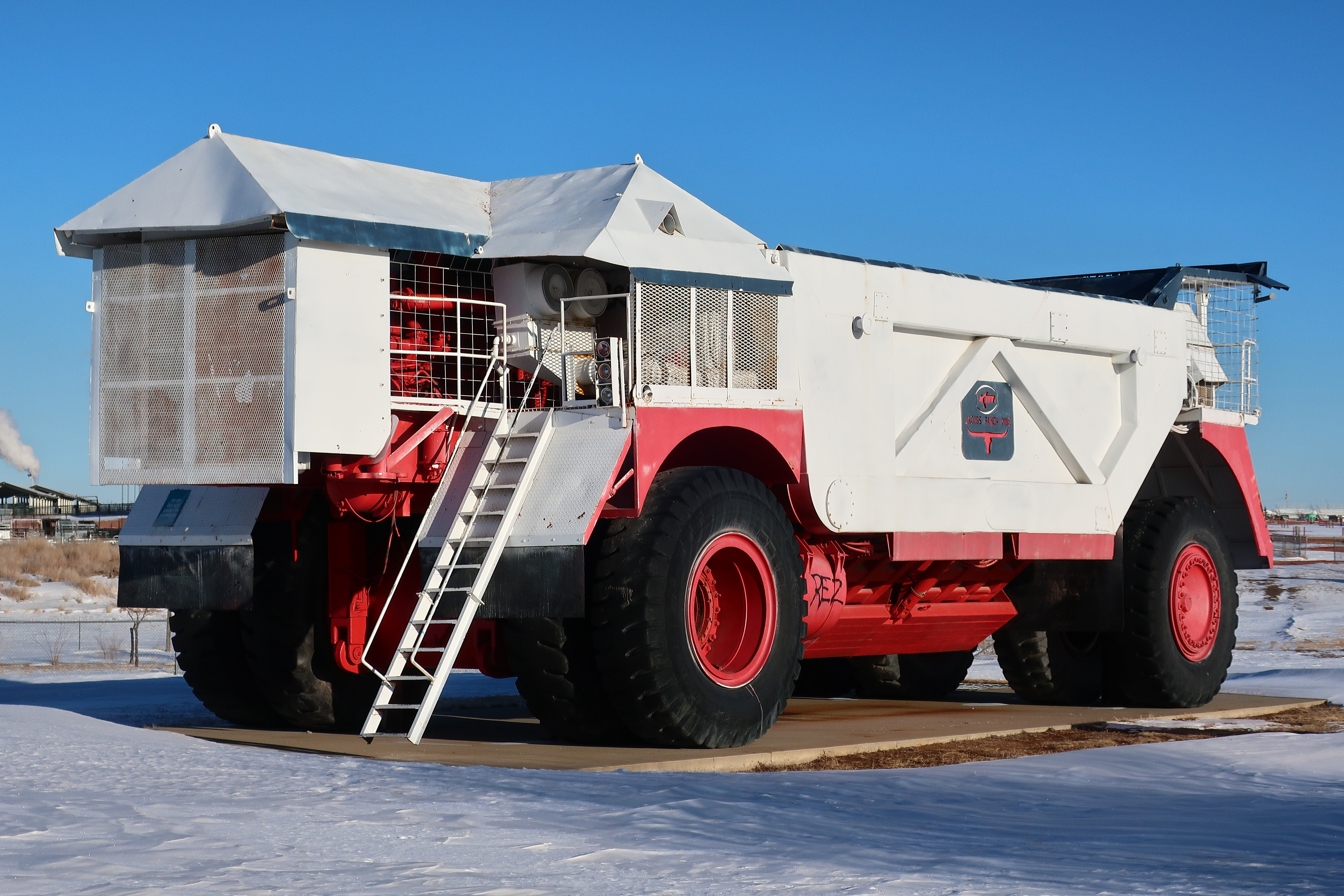
This Unit Rig BD30HD haul truck was assembled at Jacobs Ranch Mine and operated for 20,000 hours hauling 10 million tons of coal. It is now on display at the outdoor Energy Equipment Exhibit museum in Gillette, Wyoming.

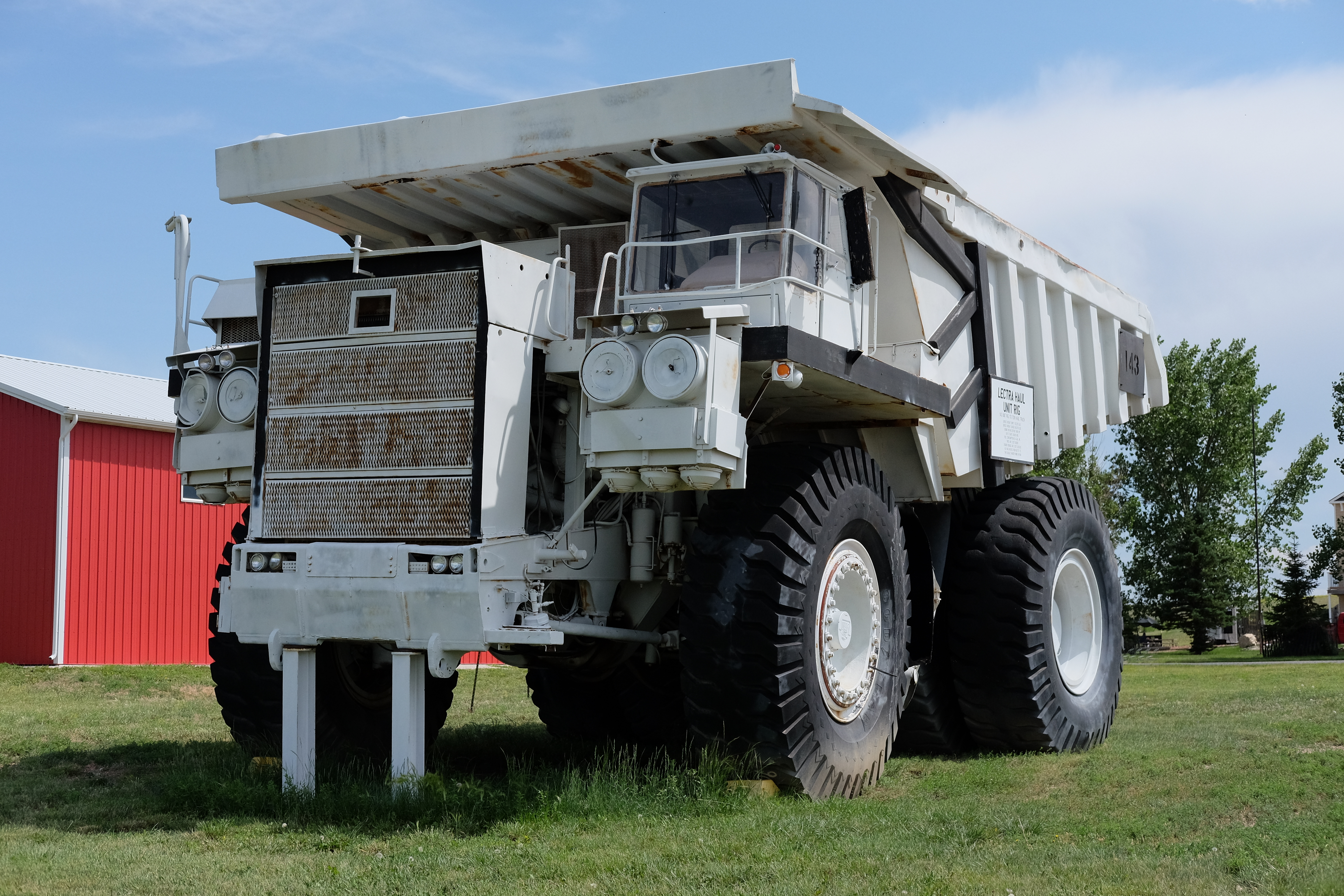
Unit Rig Lectra haul truck 143 is on display at the Wright Centennial Museum in Wright, Wyoming. Its gross empty weight is 223,276 lbs and it houses a 16V149 Detroit 1600 HP engine while using 20 gallons of fuel an hour.

=== Early models ===
- M64
- M85 Kennecott Copper Co., Chino Mines, Santa Rita, NM received the first three M85s produced, serial numbers 52, 53, and 54. Serial #51 was their factory prototype.
- M100
- M120
- M200 (The first 200 tonne capacity truck with two axles)

=== Second generation ===
- MK24
- MK30: Became MT3000
- MK33: Became MT3300
- MK36
- MT1900: Upgraded to MT2050, then MT2120, then became MT4000

=== Third generation (square appearance) ===
- MT3000
- MT3300
- MT3600
- MT3700
- MT4000

=== Fourth generation (rounded appearance) ===
Sold as Lectra Haul, Terex, Bucyrus and now badged Unit Rig under Caterpillar ownership

- MT2700
- MT3000
- MT3300
- MT3600
- MT3700
- MT4400
- MT5500
- Bucyrus MT6300AC: 400 ton class truck

=== Coal haulers ===
- BD145: Became BD30 Unitized bottom dump hauler
- BD160
- BD180
- BD240/270

== See also ==
- Haul truck
