= Uranium mining in Wyoming =

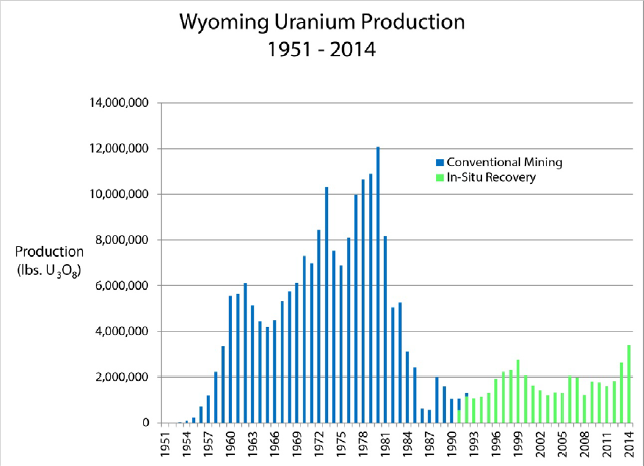
Wyoming uranium production.

Uranium mining in Wyoming was formerly a much larger industry than it is today. Wyoming once had many operating uranium mines, and still has the largest known uranium ore reserves of any state in the U.S. At the end of 2008, the state had estimated reserves dependent on price: 539 million pounds of uranium oxide at $50 per pound, and 1,227 million pounds at $100 per pound.

Wyoming has produced a total of 84,000 tonnes of uranium, and from 1995 until 2015, actually led the nation in production. Total reserves as of 2015 still amounts to 141,000 tonnes at 0.065 percent grade. However, since the early 1990s, this production has been by the in situ leach method.

The Wyoming uranium mining industry was hard-hit in the 1980s by the drop in the price of uranium. When the uranium price dropped, the uranium-mining boom town of Jeffrey City lost 95% of its population in three years.

Uranium mining in Wyoming

== Powder River Basin ==
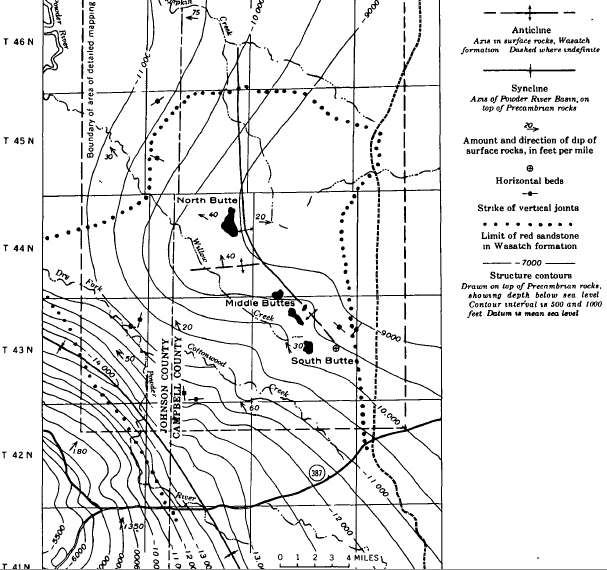
Geological map of the Pumpkin Buttes uranium area

US Geological Survey geologist David Love discovered uranium in 1951 near Pumpkin Buttes, about 25 miles northeast of Midwest, Wyoming. Other deposits were found along a 60-mile northwest-southeast trend in the southwest part of the Powder River Basin, and production began in 1953. The deposits are roll fronts in fluvial sandstones of the Eocene Wasatch Formation and underlying Paleocene Fort Union Formation. The principal ore minerals are uraninite, coffinite, metatyuyamunite, and carnotite. Gangue minerals are calcite, gypsum, pyrite, iron oxide, and barite.

== Northern Black Hills ==
Uranium was discovered in 1952 in Cretaceous sandstones of the Inyan Kara Group near its outcrop in Crook County, Wyoming, near the northeast edge of the Black Hills. Production began in 1953. Ore minerals are uraninite and coffinite in unoxidized sandstone, and carnotite and tyuyamunite in oxidized sandstone. Gangue minerals in unoxidized deposits are pyrite, marcasite, and calcite; in oxidized deposits calcite and iron oxide.

No mining has taken place in the Northern Black Hills district in recent years, but recent high uranium prices have brought new exploration drilling to the area.

== Gas Hills ==
The Gas Hills district, straddling the Natrona-Fremont county line in central Wyoming, was discovered on 9 Sept. 1953 by Neil McNeice, which led to the development of the Luck Mc Mine and others, with ore production beginning in 1955. The ore consisted of lenticular bodies of meta-autunite, uraninite, and coffinite in fluvial arkosic sandstones in the upper Wind River Formation of Eocene age. Mining was mostly by open pit, although there were also some underground mines. Strathmore Minerals Corp. of Kelowna, British Columbia is currently applying for permits to mine properties in the Gas Hills district.

== Little Mountain district ==
In the Little Mountain mining district on the west side of the Bighorn Mountains, Big Horn County, Wyoming, uranium was produced from 1955 to 1970 from paleokarst breccias in the Madison Limestone of Mississippian age. The uranium occurs as carnotite and tyuyamunite.

== Shirley Basin ==
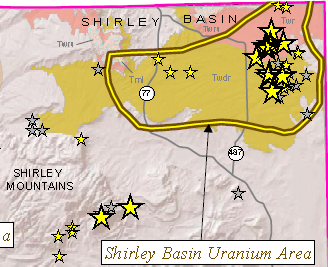
Map of the Shirley Basin Uranium Area.

Uranium was discovered in the Shirley Basin, Carbon County, in 1955. Production began in 1960 from underground and open-pit mines. Mining by in-situ leaching began in 1961, the first in-situ leach mining of uranium in the United States. The ore occurs as roll fronts in Eocene sandstone of the Wind River Formation, as uraninite with pyrite, marcasite, hematite, calcite, and organic matter.

== Crooks Gap district ==
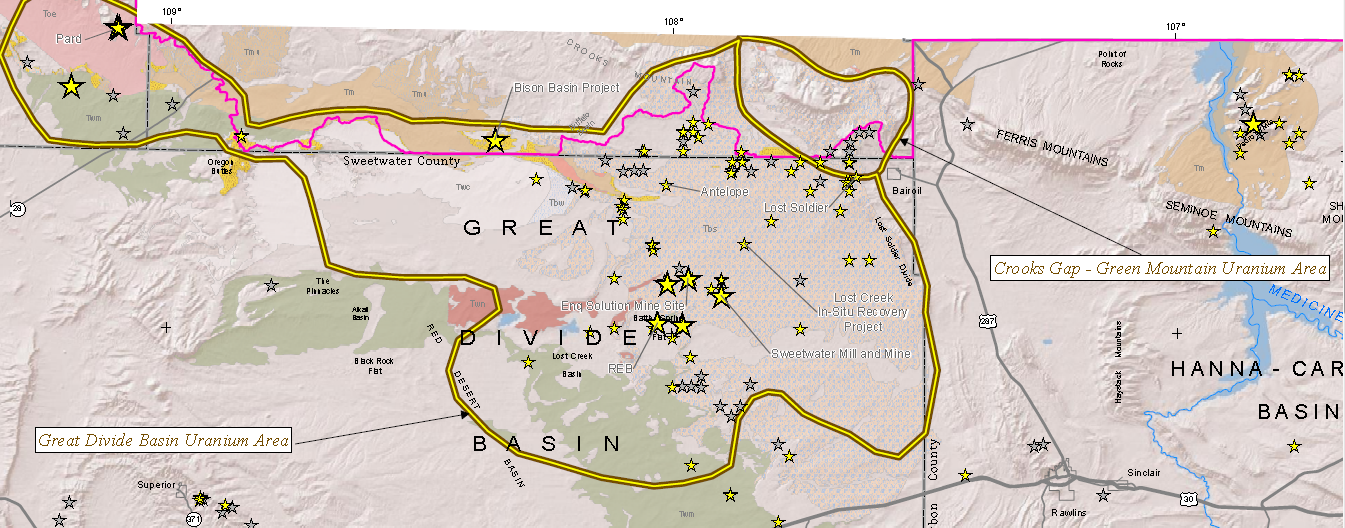
Map of the Crooks Gap-Green Mountain and Great Divide Basin Uranium Areas. Large yellow stars depict past producers and smaller yellow stars depict prospects.

The Crooks Gap district of Fremont County contains uranium ore in fluvial sandstones of the Eocene Battle Spring Formation. Most uranium deposits are in the Wasatch, with ore zones containing uraninite and pyrite. Oxidized ores include uranophane, meta-autunite, and phosphuranylite.

== Current Activity ==
By 2006, the only active uranium mine in Wyoming was the Smith Ranch-Highland in-situ leaching operation in the Powder River Basin, owned by Power Resources, Inc., a subsidiary of Cameco. The mine produced 907 tonnes of yellowcake (uranium oxide concentrate, U_{3}O_{8}) in 2006, making it the leading uranium producer in the United States.

In October 2007, Energy Metals Corp. applied for a Nuclear Regulatory Commission (NRC) permit to start an in-situ leach mine at the Moore Ranch deposit in Campbell County in the Powder River Basin. Energy Metals is a subsidiary of Uranium One. The permit application is the first NRC application since 1988 for a new uranium recovery facility. The Moore Ranch deposit contains an estimated 5.8 million pounds (2600 tonnes) of uranium oxide. The uranium will be absorbed onto ion-exchange resin beads at the mine; the beads will be shipped to existing facilities of Power Resources Inc. (Cameco) in Wyoming and Nebraska for recovery of the uranium.

In September 2014, Uranerz Energy shipped the first uranium concentrate from its Nichols Ranch mine in the Powder River Basin. Nichols Ranch is an in-situ leach mine, using oxygenated water and sodium bicarbonate to dissolve the uranium. The uranium is recovered at the surface onto resin beads by ion exchange. The resin beads are shipped to Cameco's Smith Ranch mill, where the uranium is recovered. Uranerz expects to produce 300,000 to 400,000 pounds of uranium concentrate in 2014.

== See also ==
- High Plains Uranium
- Uranium mining
- Uranium mining in the United States
- List of uranium mines
