= Black Thunder Coal Mine =

Coal mine in Wyoming, United States

- Location in Wyoming
- Location: Wyoming, Wyoming, United States; 43°40′N 105°18′W
- Products: Coal
- Opened: 1977
- Company: Core Natural Resources

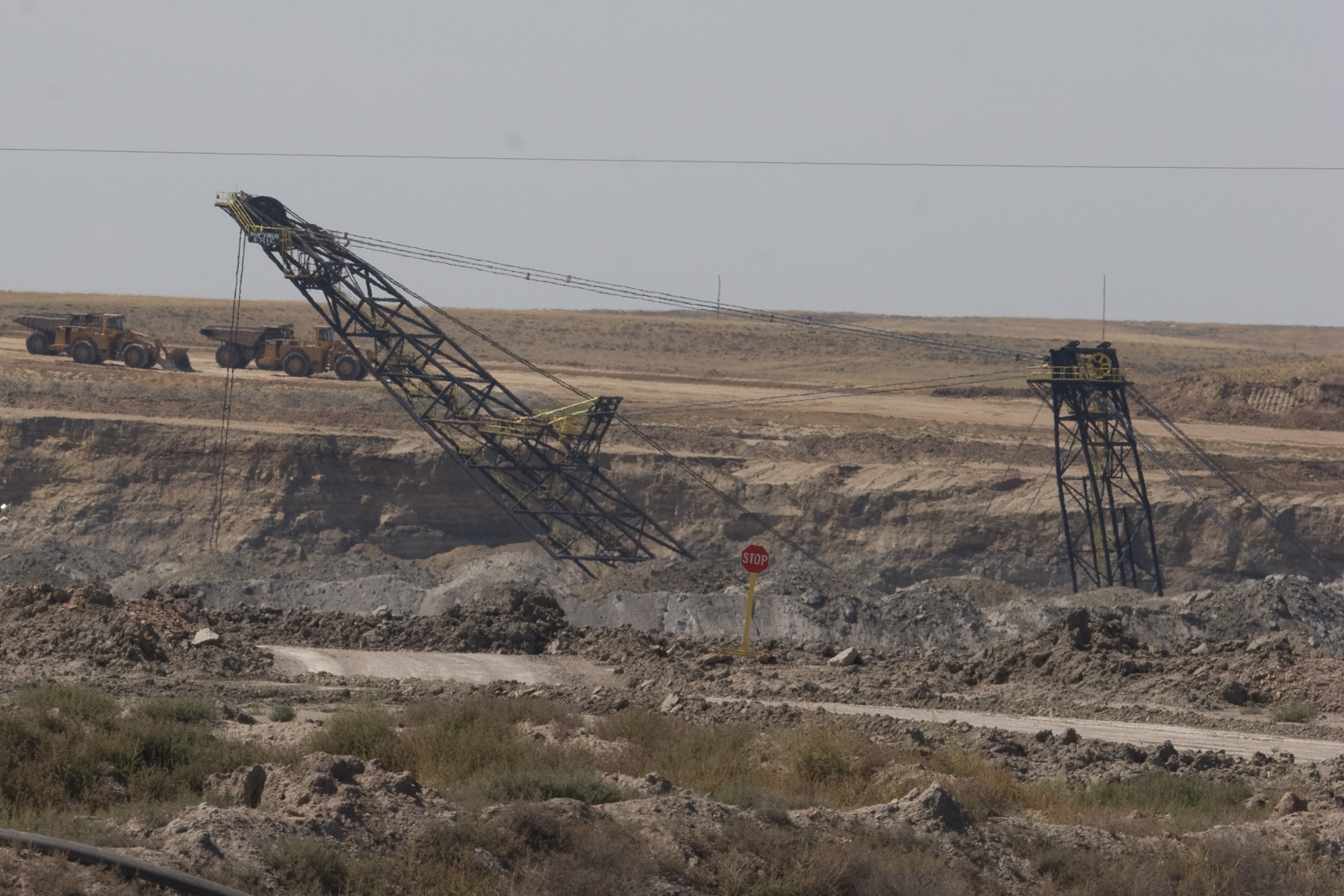
"Ursa Major" dragline at Black Thunder Coal Mine, 2009

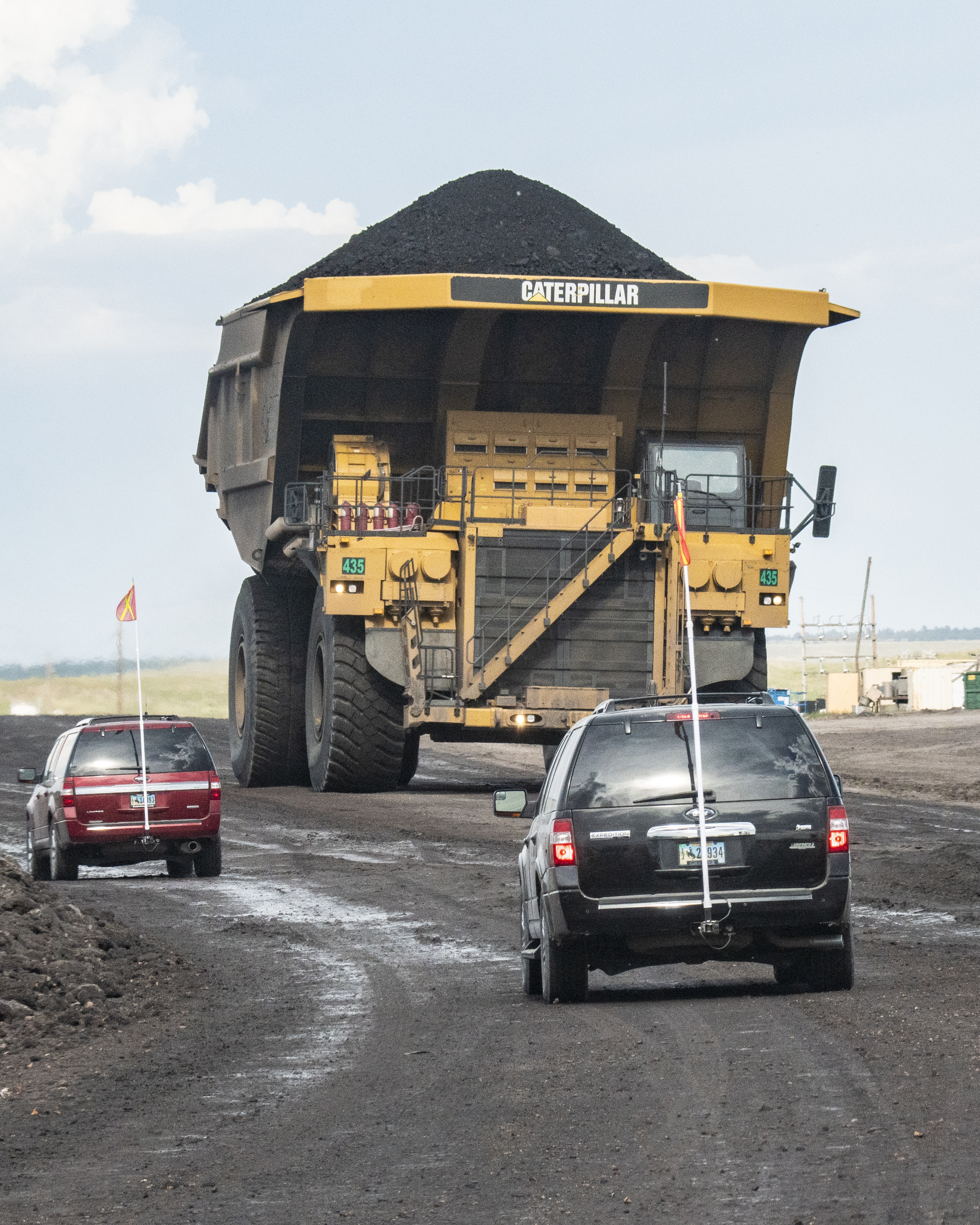
370-ton Coal Haul Truck at work, 2019

The Black Thunder Coal Mine is a surface coal mine in the U.S. state of Wyoming, located in the Powder River Basin which contains one of the largest deposits of coal in the world. In 2022, the mine produced 62,180,000 short tons (56,410,000 t) of coal, over 25% of Wyoming's total coal production.

Black Thunder's dragline excavator Ursa Major is the biggest working dragline in North America and the third largest ever made. It produces enough coal to load up to 20-25 trains per day. Draglines are not used to dig coal, but only strip overburden. Black Thunder operates six draglines. Coal is excavated by power shovels and loaded into haul trucks. In 1974, exploration geologist Lewis R. Ladwig drilled exploratory holes on the Jacob sheep ranch. He was working for ARCO. He discovered the coal reserves of the basin. In 2009, the America's Power Factuality Tour stopped at the Black Thunder Coal Mine to report on its role in generating electricity in the US.

In 2010, the Black Thunder Mine produced an estimated 115 million tons of coal, an increase of 34 million tons over 2009. The increase was a result of merging the Jacobs Ranch Mine - and its average 38 million tons per year - into the Black Thunder's annual production. With the acquisition of Jacobs Ranch Mine, Black Thunder is now the world's top coal producer.

In 2011, the America Revealed "Electric Nation" episode aired on PBS and features Thunder Basin's Black Thunder coal mine.

Black Thunder was reported to have mined 101.2 million tons of coal in 2014.

The mine produced 62.2 million tons of coal in 2022, and is the largest producer of coal in the US.

== History ==
The mine was opened in 1977, and operated by ARCO Coal until it was acquired in 1998 by Arch Coal. For most of its existence, Black Thunder has been the largest mine in the country (by production), but it was surpassed by the nearby North Antelope Rochelle Mine. North Antelope Rochelle was created after Peabody Energy purchased the Rochelle mine adjacent to their North Antelope Mine, and consolidated operations. Arch Coal, Inc. announced on March 9, 2009 that it has agreed to purchase Rio Tinto's Jacobs Ranch mine adjoining Black Thunder, which resulted in Black Thunder once again becoming the largest mine in the world.

The operator claims that "Black Thunder's active mine footprint comprises less than 1/4000th of Wyoming's land area", i.e. up to approximately 25 square miles (60 square km), but reclaimed land and as yet undisturbed areas are not included in this figure and much larger.

In 2024, Arch Resources announced intention to shrink its operational footprint in Wyoming, with the end goal of eventual closure of these mines.

== Environmental impact ==
In 2022, a team of researchers in a paper published in Energy Policy identified the Black Thunder coal mine as a "carbon bomb," a fossil fuel project that would result in more than one gigaton of carbon dioxide emissions if fully extracted and burnt.
