= North Antelope Rochelle Mine =

Coal mine in Wyoming, United States

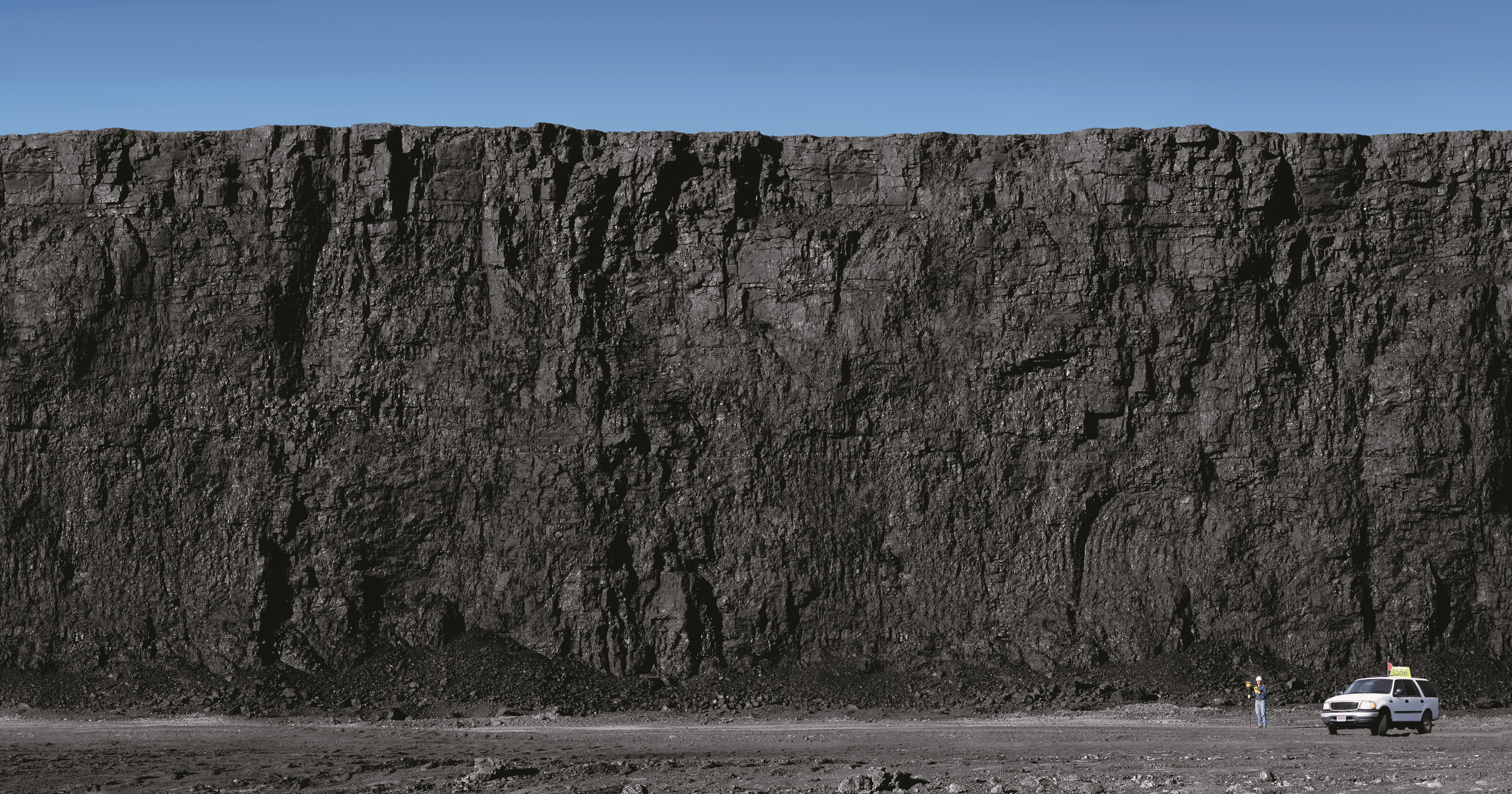
- An 80-foot (24 m) coal seam at the North Antelope Rochelle opencut coal mine.

- Location in Wyoming
- Location: Wyoming, United States; 43°33′32″N 105°17′18″W
- Products: Coal
- Opened: 1983
- Company: Peabody Energy

The North Antelope Rochelle Mine is the largest coal mine in the world. Located in Campbell County, Wyoming, about 65 miles (105 km) south of Gillette, it produced 85.3 million tons of coal in 2019.

Peabody Energy opened the North Antelope Mine in the heart of Wyoming's Powder River Basin in 1983. The Rochelle mine was opened in 1984. They were combined in 1999, making the largest coal mine in the United States. A contender for the title of largest mine emerged in 2009 when Arch Coal, the owner of the Black Thunder Coal Mine bought the Jacobs Ranch Mine. These two operations merged and North Antelope Rochelle ceded the title of largest mine to Black Thunder in 2012.

North Antelope Rochelle is a surface mine. Draglines and trucks and shovels are used to remove the overburden. Trucks then haul the coal from the three pits to trains for shipment to customers. North Antelope Rochelle employed 1,365 people in 2011. This number has recently gone down, as Peabody Energy decided to reduce its workforce at the mine by 15% because of a downturn in the coal industry.

On June 23, 2023, the mine was struck by an EF2 tornado. Major damage occurred and eight employees were injured.

== Grade of coal and scale of operations ==
The Powder River Basin of Wyoming and Montana is the largest low-sulfur coal source in the US. Eight of the ten largest mines in the United States are located in the basin. Annual Production at North Antelope Rochelle was 107.7 million tons in 2012, 109.0 million tons in 2011, 105.8 million tons in 2010, and 109.3 million tons in 2015, making the North Antelope Rochelle the largest producer of coal in the United States. Recoverable reserves are 1,245 million tons. The average grade of the coal shipped from the mine is 8,800 British thermal units per pound (20,000 kJ/kg), 0.2% sulfur, 4.40% ash, and 1.70% sodium (of the ash), making North Antelope Rochelle coal the cleanest in the United States. In 2012 the mine won an award from the Department of the Interior for its reclamation efforts over the life of the mine.

Using the above figures, one hundred million metric tons of coal mined here are equivalent to 2.047 exajoules (5.69×10^{11} kWh) of heat energy. For comparison, the uranium mined at McArthur River uranium mine, the largest uranium mine in the world, would be equivalent (at a CANDU-typical burnup of 200 MWh/kg) to 4.46 exajoules (1.24×10^{12} kWh) of thermal energy, but used for the more common types of nuclear reactors, the uranium mine produces less energy content than North Antelope Rochelle.
