= Open-pit mining =

Surface mining technique

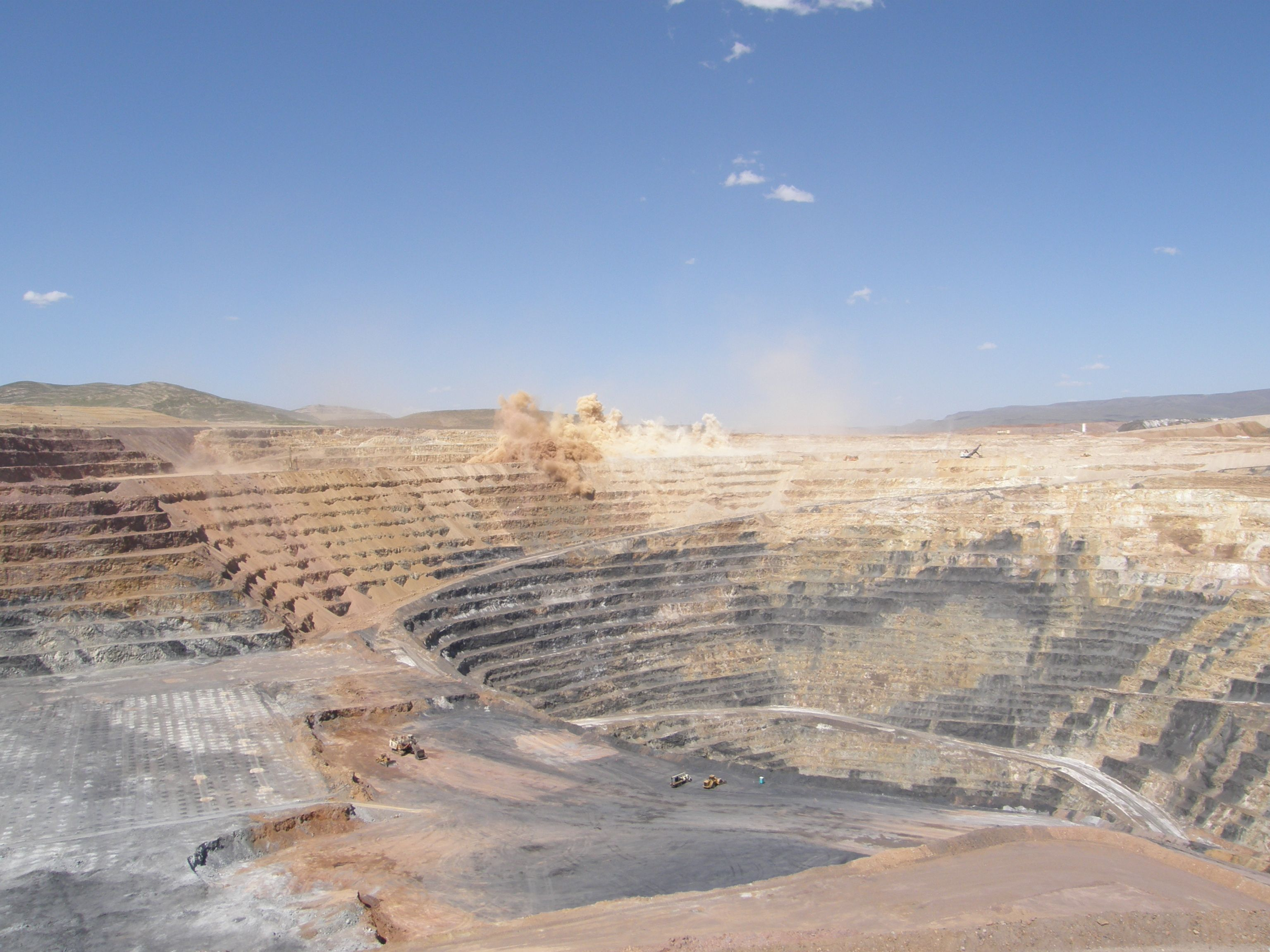
Rock blasting at the large open-pit Twin Creeks gold mine in Nevada, United States. Note the size of the excavators for scale (foreground, left), and that the bottom of the mine is not visible.

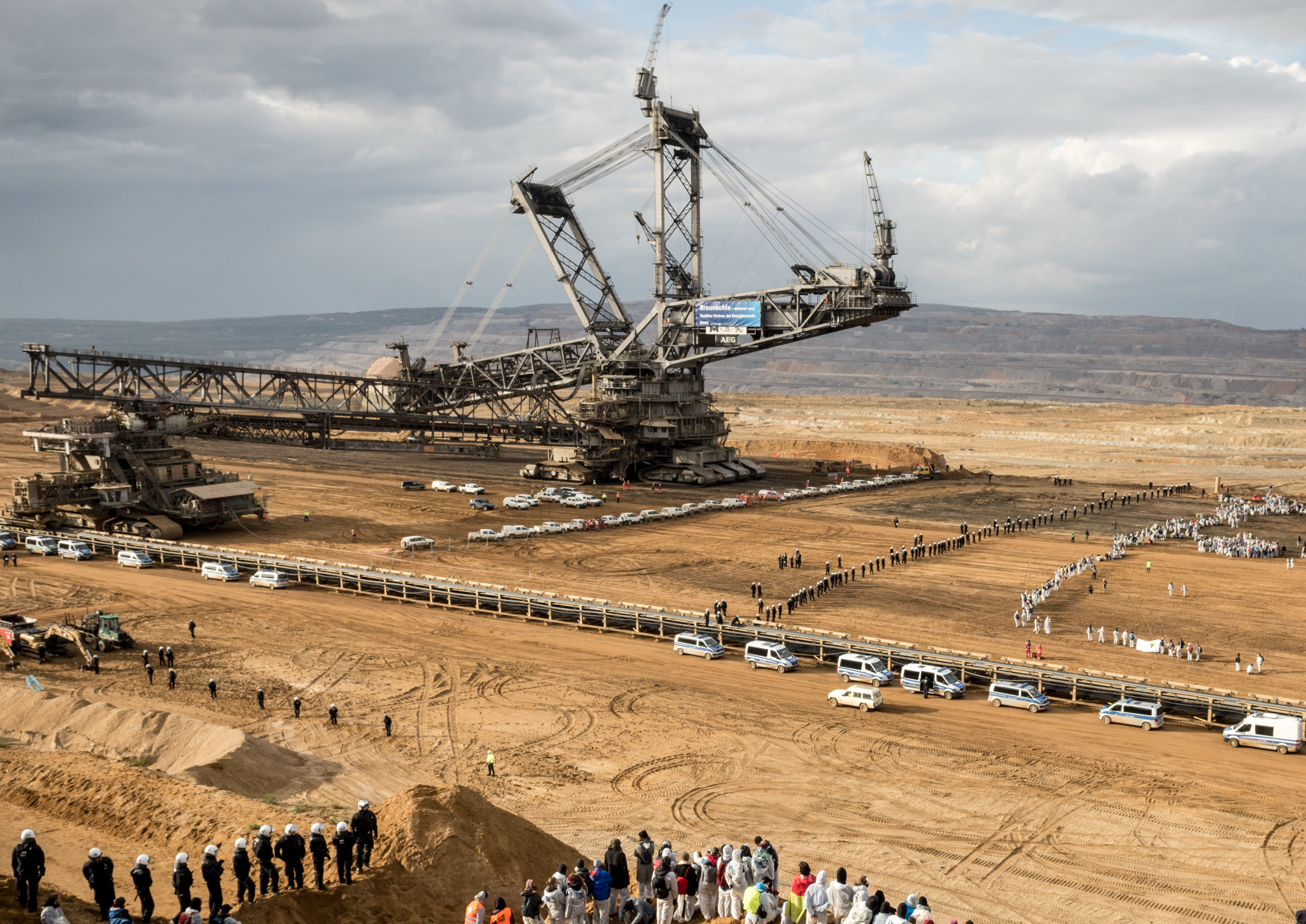
The giant bucket-wheel excavators in the German Rhineland coal mines are among the world's biggest land vehicles.

Open-pit mining, also known as open-cast or open-cut mining and in larger contexts mega-mining, is a surface mining technique that extracts rock or minerals from the earth.

Open-pit mines are used when deposits of commercially useful ore or rocks are found near the surface where the overburden is relatively thin. In contrast, deeper mineral deposits can be reached using underground mining.

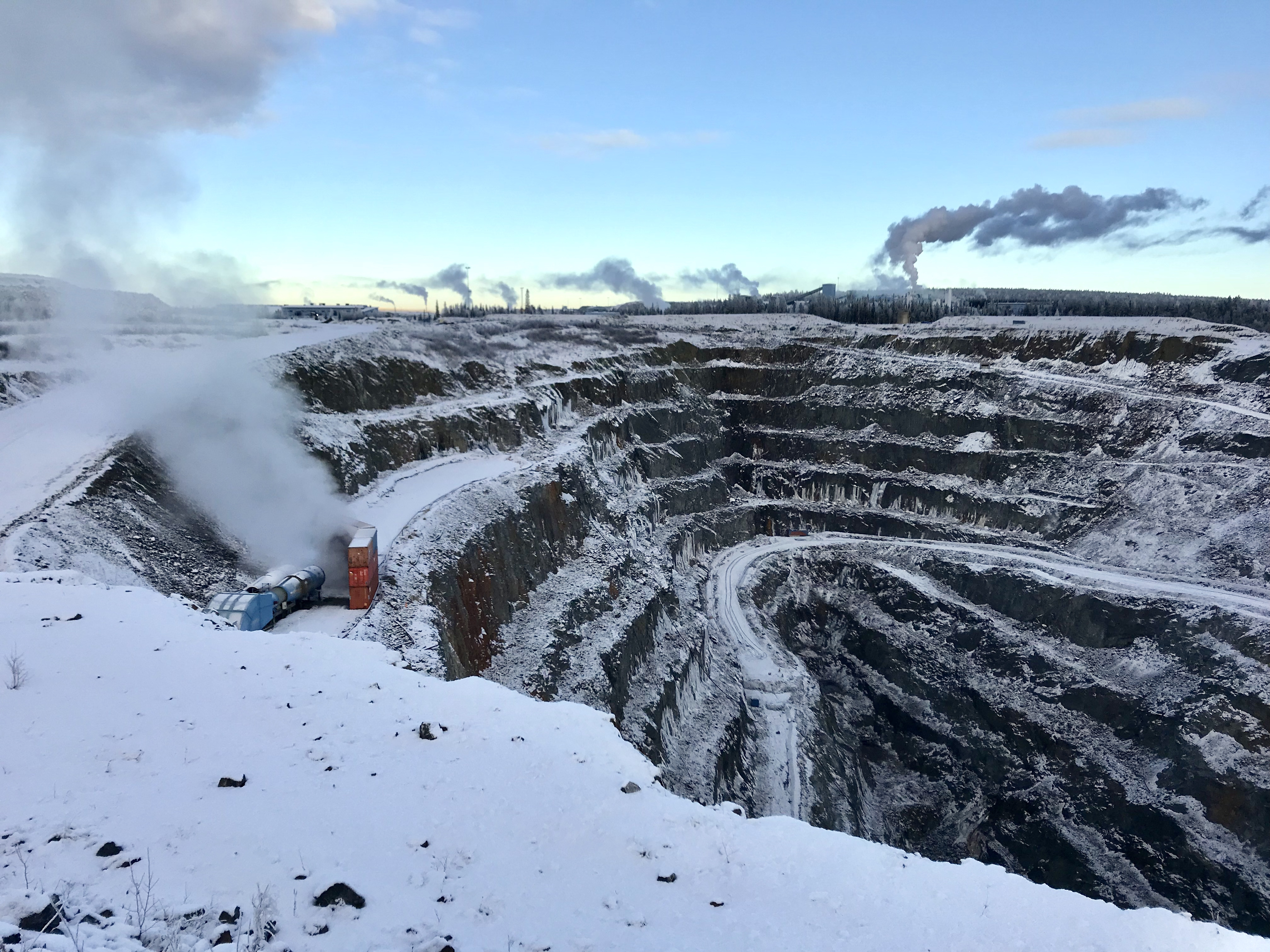
Kittilä Gold Mine in Kittilä, Finland is the largest primary gold producer in Europe.

This form of mining carries several risks to the health and safety of miners, and can have a significant negative impact on the environment.

== Extraction ==
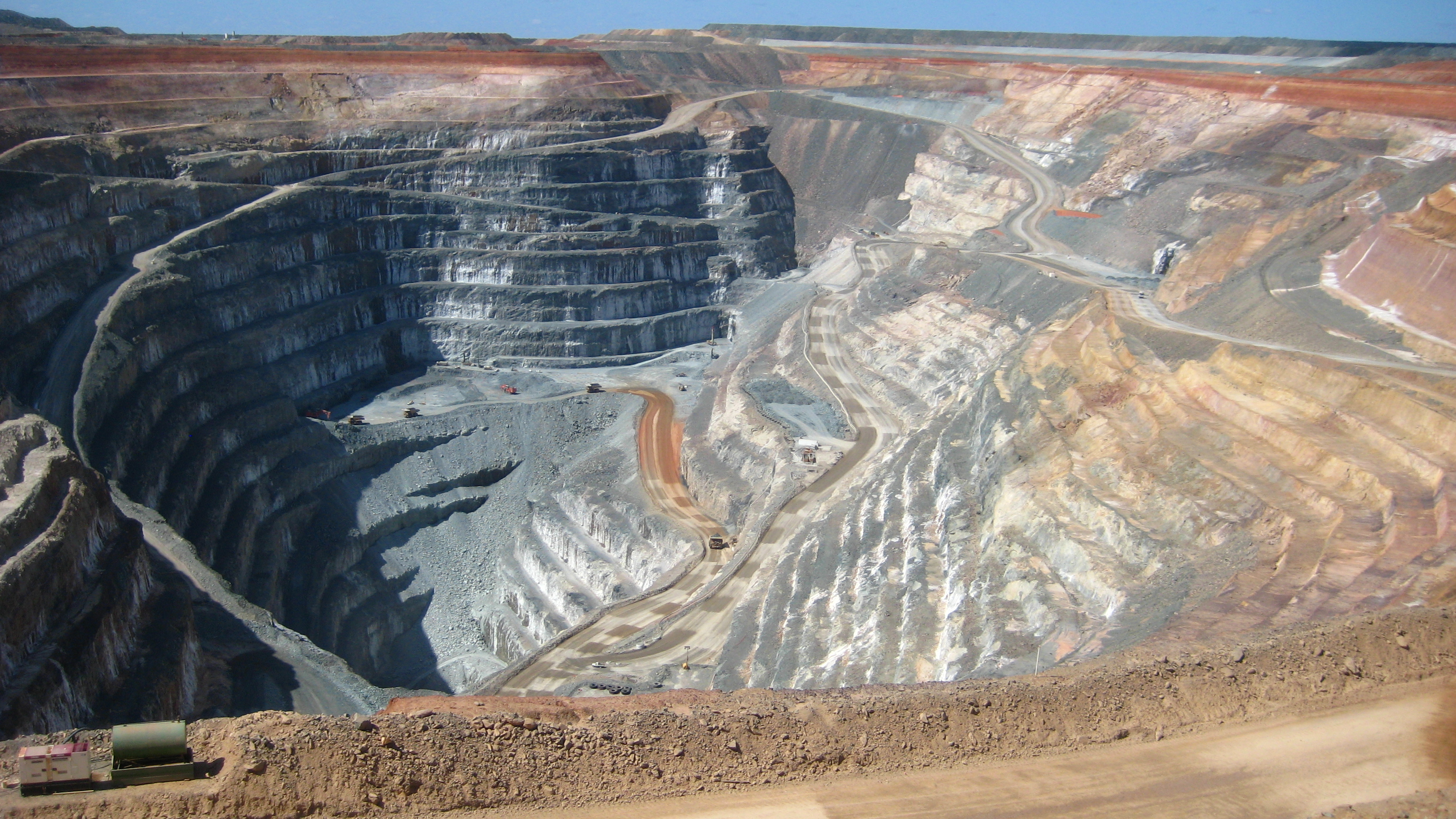
Note the angled and stepped sides of the Sunrise Dam Gold Mine, Australia.

A bucket-wheel excavator extracting lignite from Garzweiler surface mine in Germany during 2008

Miners typically drill a series of test holes to locate an underground ore body. From the extracted samples, they can determine the extent of the ore. This helps them determine the likely location of the veins or benches of ore and its commercial value. Open-pit mines that produce building materials and dimension stone are commonly referred to as quarries.

Open-cast mines are dug on benches, which describe vertical levels of the hole. The interval of the benches depends on the deposit being mined, the mineral being mined, and the size of the machinery that is being used. Generally, large mine benches are 12 to 15 metres thick. In contrast, many quarries do not use benches, as they are usually shallow. Mining can be conducted on more than one bench at a time, and access to different benches is done with a system of ramps. The width of each bench is determined by the size of the equipment being used, generally 20–40 metres wide. Downward ramps are created to allow mining on a new level to begin. This new level will become progressively wider to form the new pit bottom. As mining progresses, more benches are created at the bottom of the pit as the pit becomes deeper to extract more ore from the bottom of the pit. To maintain stability, the surface of the pit at ground level grows horizontally in both width and length.

Most walls of the pit are generally mined on an angle less than vertical. Waste rock is stripped when the pit becomes deeper, therefore this angle is a safety precaution to prevent and minimize damage and danger from rock falls. However, this depends on how weathered and eroded the rocks are, and the type of rocks involved. It also depends on the amount of structural weaknesses that occur within the rocks, such as faults, shears, joints or foliations. The benches are created by drilling into existing benches and using an explosive such as ammonium nitrate, then detonated using electric current. Then large shovels are used to remove material from the bench and place it into large ultraclass mining trucks.

The walls are stepped. The inclined section of the wall is known as the batter, and the flat part of the step is known as the bench or berm. The steps in the walls help prevent rock falls continuing down the entire face of the wall. In some instances additional ground support is required and rock bolts, cable bolts and shotcrete are used. De-watering bores may be used to relieve water pressure by drilling horizontally into the wall, which is often enough to cause failures in the wall by itself.

A haul road is usually situated at the side of the pit, forming a ramp up which trucks can drive, carrying ore and waste rock.

== After closure ==
Open-pit mines are typically worked until either the mineral resource is exhausted, or an increasing ratio of overburden to ore makes further mining uneconomic. After open-pit mines are closed, they are sometimes converted to landfills for disposal of solid waste. Some form of water control is usually required to keep the mine pit from becoming a lake. Several former open-pit mines have been deliberately converted into artificial lakes, forming areas such as the Lusatian Lake District, the Central German Lake District or the Upper Palatinate Lake District. A particular concern in the formation of these lakes is acid mine drainage.

== Impacts ==
Open-pit mining is considered one of the most dangerous sectors in the industrial world, and can cause significant harm to miners' health. It can also have significant negative environmental impact, depending on the type of mineral being mined, and the type of mining process being used.

=== Waste ===
Open-pit mines create a significant amount of waste. Almost one million tons of ore and waste rock can move from the largest mines per day, and a couple thousand tons moved from small mines per day. There are generally four main operations in a mine that contribute to this load: drilling, blasting, loading, and hauling.

Waste rock is hauled to a waste dump. Waste dumps can be piled at the surface of the active pit, or in previously mined pits.

Leftover waste from processing the ore is called tailings, and is generally in the form of a slurry. This is pumped to a tailings dam or settling pond, where the water is reused or evaporated. Tailings dams are inherently toxic once in regular use due to the presence of unextracted sulfide minerals, some forms of toxic minerals in the gangue, and often cyanide which is used to treat gold ore via the cyanide leach process. If proper environmental protections are not in place, this toxicity usually harms the surrounding environment.

=== Pollutants ===
Open-pit mining involves the process of disrupting the ground, which leads to the creation of air pollutants. The main source of air pollutants comes from the transportation of minerals, but there are various other factors including drilling, blasting and the loading and unloading of overburden. These types of pollutants cause significant damage to public health and safety in addition to damaging the air quality. The inhalation of these pollutants can cause issues to the lungs and ultimately increase mortality. Furthermore, the pollutants affect flora and fauna in the areas surrounding open-pit mines.

Open-pit gold mining is one of the highest potential mining threats on the environment as it affects the air and water chemistry. The exposed dust may be toxic or radioactive, making it a health concern for the workers and the surrounding communities.

=== Deforestation ===
Open-pit nickel mining has led to environmental degradation and pollution in developing countries such as the Philippines and Indonesia. In 2024, nickel mining and processing was one of the main causes of deforestation in Indonesia. Open-pit cobalt mining has led to deforestation and habitat destruction in the Democratic Republic of Congo.

=== Safety ===
Open-pit mining is considered one of the most dangerous sectors in the industrial world. and can cause significant effects to miners' health.

== Hydrology in mining ==
Open-pit mines operating in an area with heavy groundwater features may eventually face hydrology-related problems. This includes heaving and bursting of the mine floor due to excessive uplift pressure. A groundwater control system must be installed to fix problems caused by hydrology. The formation of an appropriate open-pit slope design, changes throughout the life of a mine. It is based mainly on an ever-increasing understanding of the rock mass conditions, including groundwater and associated pressures that may be acting within the slopes. The reduction of groundwater related to pore pressures is a crucial aspect of determining whether or not a geotechnical engineering design for open-pit slopes is attainable. Groundwater control systems, which include dewatering and depressurization wells, may also have a large impact on local groundwater. Because of this, an optimization-based version of the control system is required to ensure that local and regional hydro-geological impacts are within acceptable ranges.

Open Pit depressurization is the process of removing tensions or pressure from different areas of a mine. Depressurization helps to make open-pit mines more stable and secure. By using an integrated mine slope depressurization program the likelihood that mine plans can be achieved, and at an acceptable level of risk increase drastically. Depressurization allows considerable expansions of a mine, and can extend the life of the mine by 10 to 15 years. One technique used in depressurization is annealing. Annealing is the slow heating and cooling of a metal, alloy or glass. This slow heating and cooling relieves the internal stress of surrounding areas. Annealing will increase a material's workability and durability, which overall increases open-pit mine safety. When groundwater pressures cause problems in open-pit mines, horizontal drains are used to aid in accelerating the slope depressurization process. Which helps to prevent large scale slope failure in the mine. Horizontal drains are used to lower pore pressure by reducing groundwater head, which enhances slope stability.

== Untopping ==
A form of open-cast quarrying may be carried out as 'untopping'. This is done where a previous underground mine is becoming uneconomic or worked-out, but still leaves valuable rock in place, often as a result of room and pillar mining. Untopping removes the overburden from above this, opens up the mine from above, and then allows the previously 'trapped' minerals to be won.

Untopping was a feature of Welsh slate workings in the 1930s and 2000s, where Martyn Williams-Ellis, manager at Llechwedd found that earlier Victorian workings could be kept profitable with the newly mechanised techniques for bulk excavation to extract their pillars, and more recently across a number of worked-out mines.

== Rehabilitation ==
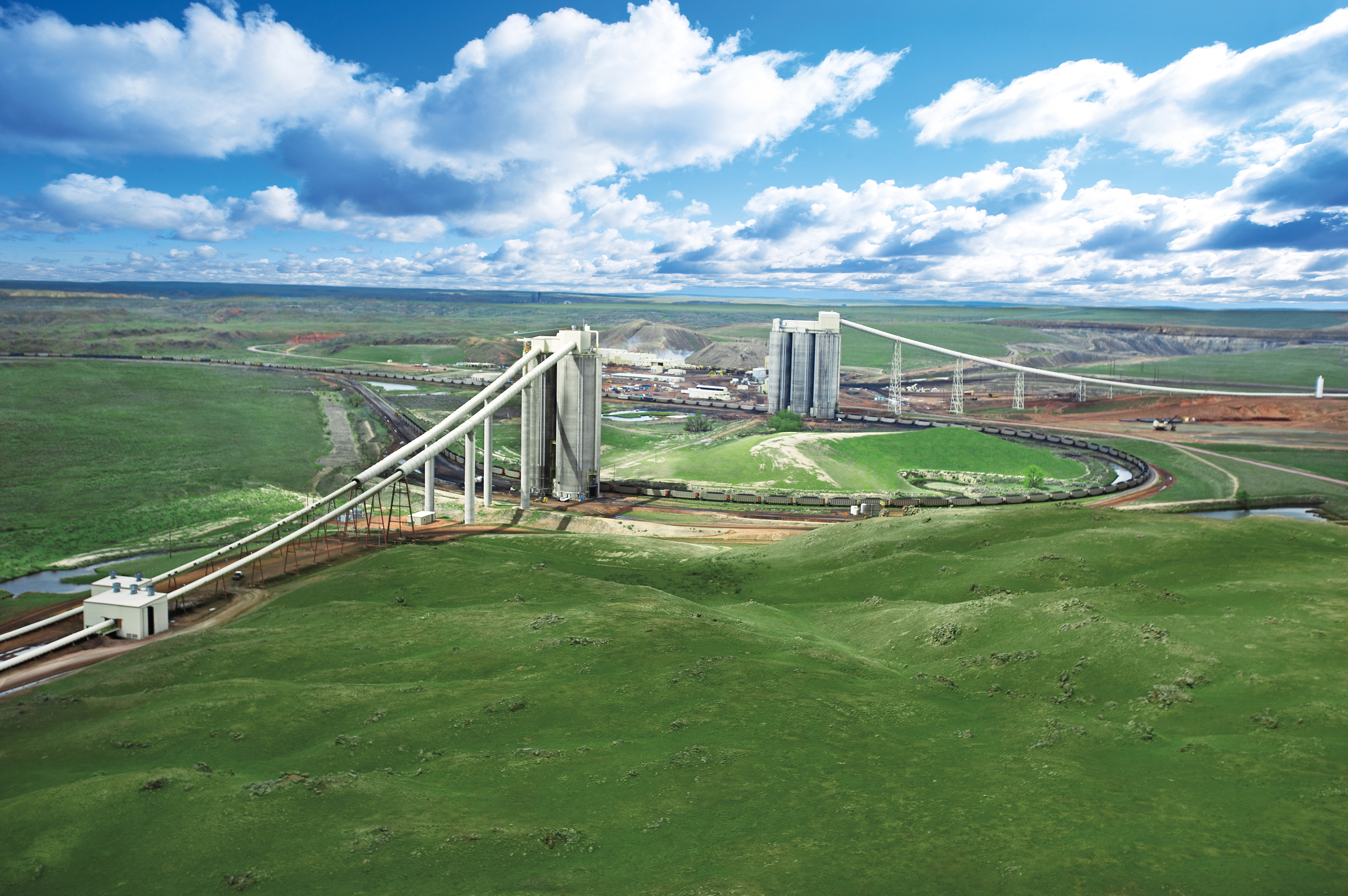
A loadout station and reclaimed land at the North Antelope Rochelle open-pit coal mine, in Wyoming, United States

After mining ends at a location, the mine area may undergo land rehabilitation. Waste dumps are contoured to flatten them out, to further stabilize them. If the ore contains sulfides it is usually covered with a layer of clay to prevent ingress of rain and oxygen from the air, which can oxidize the sulfides to produce sulfuric acid, a phenomenon known as acid mine drainage. This is then generally covered with soil, and vegetation is planted to help consolidate the material. Eventually this layer will erode, but it is generally hoped that the rate of leaching or acid will be slowed by the cover such that the environment can handle the load of acid and associated heavy metals. There are no long term studies on the success of these covers due to the relatively short time in which large-scale open-pit mining has existed. It may take hundreds to thousands of years for some waste dumps to become "acid neutral" and stop leaching to the environment. The dumps are usually fenced off to prevent livestock denuding them of vegetation. The open pit is then surrounded with a fence, to prevent access, and it generally eventually fills up with ground water. In arid areas it may not fill due to deep groundwater levels. In Germany, the world's largest producer of lignite (virtually all of which these days is mined open-pit), the former mines are usually converted to artificial lakes. To mitigate the problem of acid mine drainage mentioned above, flooding is often done with the water of nearby rivers instead of using groundwater alone. In some cases, calcium oxide or other basic chemicals have to be added to the water to neutralize the pH-value.

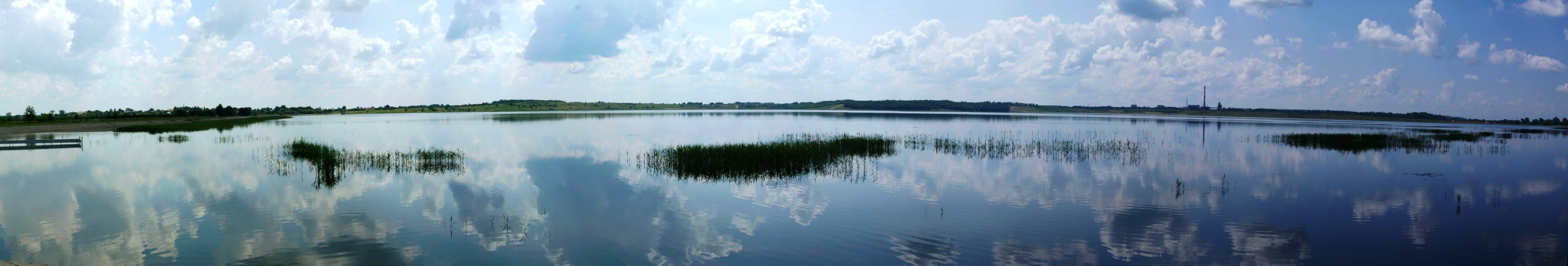
An open-pit sulfur mine at Tarnobrzeg, Poland, undergoing land rehabilitation

== Typical open cut grades ==
Gold is generally extracted in open-pit mines at 1 to 5 ppm (parts per million) but in certain cases, 0.75 ppm gold is economical. This was achieved by bulk heap leaching at the Peak Hill mine in western New South Wales, near Dubbo, Australia.

Nickel, generally as laterite, is extracted via open-pit down to 0.2%. Copper can be extracted at grades as low as 0.11% to 0.2%.

== See also ==
- Artisanal mining – Independent, small-scale, subsistence mining
- Closure problem – Computational problem in graph theory applied to open-pit mines for optimal extraction (not related to closing the mine)
- Cut (earthmoving) – Location where earth is removed to make way for a road, railway, or canal
- List of open-pit mines
- Trench – Excavated channel in ground
- Tunneling – Underground passage made for traffic
