= Arch Resources =

U.S. coal company

Arch Resources, Inc.
- Type: Subsidiary
- Traded as: NYSE: ARCH
- Industry: Coal mining
- Founded: 1969 (founded); 1997 (current corporation)
- Fate: Merged with Consol Energy to form Core Natural Resources
- Headquarters: St. Louis, Missouri
- Key people: Paul A. Lang, President/CEO; John T. Drexler, Sr.VP/COO; George J. Schuller Jr., Senior vice president and Chief Operating Officer
- Products: Coal
- Revenue: ▲US$ 2.32 billion (2017)
- Operating income: ▲US$ 232 million (2017)
- Net income: ▼US$ 582 million (2017)
- Total assets: ▼US$ 238 million (2017)
- Total equity: ▼US$ 666 million (2017)
- Number of employees: 3,790 (2017)
- Parent: Core Natural Resources
- Website: www.archrsc.com

Arch Resources, previously known as Arch Coal, was an American coal mining and processing company. The company mined, processed, and marketed bituminous and sub-bituminous coal with low sulfur content in the United States. Arch Resources was the second-largest supplier of coal in the United States, behind Peabody Energy. As of 2011 the company supplied 15% of the domestic market. Demand came mainly from generators of electricity.

Arch Resources operated 7 active mines and controlled approximately 5.5 billion tons of proven and probable coal reserves, located in Central and Northern Appalachia, the Powder River Basin, and the Western Bituminous regions. At the time of the merger, the company operated mines in Colorado, West Virginia and Wyoming, and was headquartered in St. Louis, Missouri. The company sells a substantial amount of its coal to producers of electric power, steel producers and industrial facilities.

In January 2025, Arch Resources agreed to a merger of equals with Consol Energy to form Core Natural Resources.

== History ==
Arch Coal was formed in July 1997 through the merger of publicly traded Ashland Coal, Inc. and privately held Arch Mineral Corporation. Arch Mineral had its origins in 1969, when it was formed as a partnership between Ashland Oil (now Ashland Inc.) and the H.L.Hunt family of Dallas, Texas; Ashland Coal was formed in 1975 as a wholly owned subsidiary of Ashland Oil. With the completion of the merger, Arch became the leading producer of low-sulfur coal in the eastern United States.

In June 1998, Arch Coal expanded into the western United States with the acquisition of the coal assets of Atlantic Richfield. Included in this transaction were the Black Thunder Coal Mine and Coal Creek mines in the Powder River Basin of Wyoming; the West Elk longwall mine in Gunnison County, Colorado; and a 65% interest in Canyon Fuel Company, which operates three longwall mines in Utah.

In October 1998, Arch added to its Powder River Basin reserves when it was the winning bidder on Thundercloud, a 412-million-ton federal reserve tract adjacent to the Black Thunder mine.

In July 2004, Arch Coal solidified its position as a leading producer of high-Btu, low-sulfur western bituminous coal with the acquisition of the remaining 35% interest in Canyon Fuel Company and its 161-million-ton reserves.

In August 2004, Arch again expanded its position in the Powder River Basin with the acquisition of Triton's North Rochelle mine adjacent to Arch's existing Black Thunder operation. By integrating the North Rochelle mine with Black Thunder, Arch created the premier mine in the nation's fastest growing coal supply region.

In September 2004, Arch again added to its Powder River Basin reserves when it was the winning bidder on Little Thunder, a 719-million-ton federal reserve tract adjacent to the Black Thunder Coal Mine.

In December 2005, Arch Coal sold select eastern assets to Magnum Coal Company to unlock the value of some of its Central Appalachian holdings, sharpened its focus in that region, and strengthened its balance sheet in preparation for future growth.

In August 2006, Arch acquired a one-third interest in Knight Hawk Coal, a growing coal producer in the Illinois Basin.

In October 2009, Arch acquired Rio Tinto's Jacobs Ranch mine and blended it with Black Thunder Coal Mine in the southern Powder River Basin of Wyoming, creating the single largest coal mining complex in the world.

In November 2009, Arch acquired the rights to mine 731 million tons of Otter Creek coal reserves in the northern Powder River Basin of Montana.

On June 15, 2011, Arch acquired International Coal Group (ICG) and cemented its place as a top five global coal supplier and a top 10 metallurgical coal producer and marketer.

In December 2011, Arch Coal became the successful bidder for a 222 million ton federal coal lease known as the South Hilight tract in the southern Powder River Basin.

In June 2013, Arch Coal announced the planned sale of its Canyon Fuel Company LLC subsidiary to Bowie Resources, LLC. Canyon Fuel includes the Sufco, Skyline and Dugout Canyon mines in Utah.

In January 2016, Arch Coal filed for Chapter 11 bankruptcy protection. This was stated to be a part of a restructuring aiming at reducing debt by $4.5 billion.

On October 5, 2016, Arch Coal emerged from Chapter 11 bankruptcy protection. The company won a court approval allowing them to erase almost $5 billion in debt and left bankruptcy with $300 million in cash. Arch Coal resumed trading on the New York Stock Exchange under the ticker ARCH. Unsecured creditors and bondholders will receive $30 million in cash along with 6% of the new shares according to court agreements. Bondholders will also have the option to receive either warrants to buy up to 12% of the company's new stock or an additional $25 million cash.

On May 15, 2020, Arch Coal changed its name to Arch Resources.

In 2022, the stock reached a five-year high in value due to increased thermal and metallurgical coal prices.

In August 2024, Arch Resources and Consol Energy announced that they entered into a definitive agreement to combine in an all-stock merger of equals to create Core Natural Resources.

In January 2025, the merger was successfully completed. Shares of Arch ceased trading prior to market open on January 14, 2025. Shares of Core Natural Resources started trading on the New York Stock Exchange under the ticker symbol "CNR" the following day.

== Politics ==
Arch Coal PAC is named, along with other major coal producers, as a donor to the 2004 election campaign in West Virginia. 2004 was a record-setting year for donations made by the coal industry.

== Environmental impact ==
=== Mountaintop removal in Appalachia ===
Arch Coal practices mountaintop removal mining, which is controversial because it reduces the height of mountaintops. Their West Virginia mining operations in the Appalachian Mountains were the subject of a critical documentary in 2002 on Now with Bill Moyers on PBS. Arch's Dal-Tex mining operations above the town of Blair, West Virginia, were the subject of a 1998 U.S. News & World Report story "Shear Madness" by Penny Loeb. The story documented the impacts of mountaintop removal on communities close to the mines and their subsequent depopulation. A 1999 lawsuit brought by the West Virginia Highlands Conservancy, Bragg v. Robertson, was the first successful citizen lawsuit to stop Arch's proposed mountaintop removal valley fill. The fill would have buried several miles of stream at Pigeonroost Hollow near Blair. In his ruling for the plaintiffs, Judge Charles H. Haden stated that "If there is any life form that cannot acclimate to life deep in a rubble pile, it is eliminated. No effect on related environmental values is more adverse than obliteration...Under a valley fill the water quality of the stream becomes zero. Because there is no stream, there is no water quality."

As of 2012, the company reported that surface mining in Appalachian mountains accounted for roughly 4 percent of its annual coal production.

=== Colorado mining ===
Earthjustice, the Sierra Club, the Center for Biological Diversity and other environmental groups announced a campaign in 2015 against Arch Coal's mine project in the Sunset Roadless Area of Gunnison National Forest.

=== Mine reclamation ===
Arch Coal used more than $1 billion in "self-bonding" to guarantee it could pay for its mine reclamation obligations under the Surface Mining Control and Reclamation Act of 1977. After Arch Coal declared bankruptcy, the Wyoming Department of Environmental Quality agreed to accept $75 million in place of the company’s $486 million in self-bonding liability to the state.

=== Environmental awareness ===
Arch Coal’s subsidiary operations reported a water compliance rate of 99.9 percent over a 10-year period between 2002 and 2012.

In 2012, Arch Coal became the first energy company to earn the Conservation Legacy Award from the National Museum of Forest Service History. The Museum of Forest Service History awarded this honor “in recognition of [Arch Coal’s] commitment to the protection of natural resources, wildlife and water quality values during mining and restoration operations”.
