= Powder River Basin =

Geologic structural basin in the western US

Coordinates: 44.4°N 105.8°W

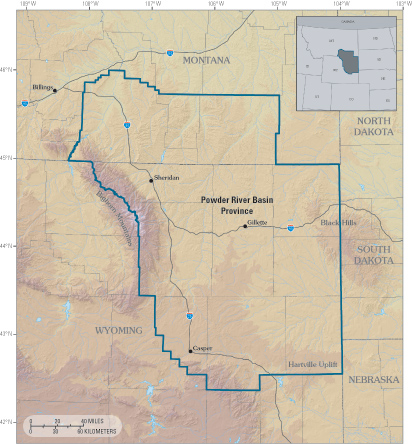
The Powder River Basin

The Powder River Basin is a geologic structural basin in southeast Montana and northeast Wyoming that trends north-south for about 249 miles (401 km) and is about 100 miles (160 km) wide, known for its extensive coal reserves. The former hunting grounds of the Oglala Lakota, the area is very sparsely populated and is known for its rolling grasslands and semiarid climate.

The basin is both a topographic drainage and geologic structural basin, drained by the Powder River, after which it is named, Cheyenne River, Tongue River, Bighorn River, Little Missouri River, Platte River, and their tributaries.

The major cities in the area include Gillette and Sheridan, Wyoming and Hardin, Montana.

In 2007, the region produced 436 million short tons (396 million tonnes) of coal, more than twice the production of second-place West Virginia, and more than the entire Appalachian region. The Powder River Basin is the largest coal-producing region in the United States. The region includes the Black Thunder Coal Mine, the most productive in the United States, and North Antelope Rochelle Mine, the second most productive. In recent years, the region has become a major producer of natural gas, both conventional natural gas and coal-bed methane.

== Geologic history ==
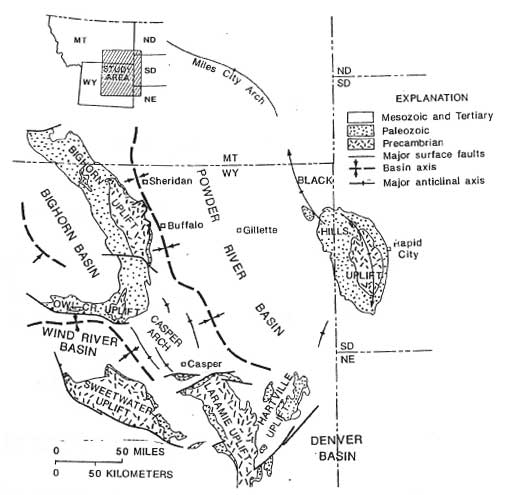
Powder River Basin and surrounding uplifts (US Geological Survey)

The Powder River Basin contains a section of Phanerozoic rocks up to 17,000 feet (5,200 m) thick, from Cambrian to Holocene.

=== Cretaceous ===
The thickest section of the Powder River Basin is composed of Cretaceous rocks, an overall regressive sequence of mostly marine shales and sandstones deposited in the Western Interior Seaway.

=== Tertiary ===
The coal beds of the region began to form about 60 million years ago when the land began rising from a shallow sea. The rise of the Black Hills uplift on the east and the Hartville uplift on the southeast side of the basin created the present outline of the Powder River Basin.

When the coal beds were forming, the climate in the area was subtropical, averaging about 120 inches (3 m) of rainfall a year. For some 25 million years, the basin floor was covered with lakes and swamps. Because of the large area of the swamps, the organic material accumulated into peat bogs instead of being washed into the sea. Periodically the layers of peat were covered with sediments washed in from nearby mountains. Eventually the climate became drier and cooler. The basin filled with sediment and buried the peat under thousands of feet, compressing the layers of peat and forming coal. Over the last several million years, much of the overlying sediment has eroded away, leaving the coal seams near the surface.

== Coal ==
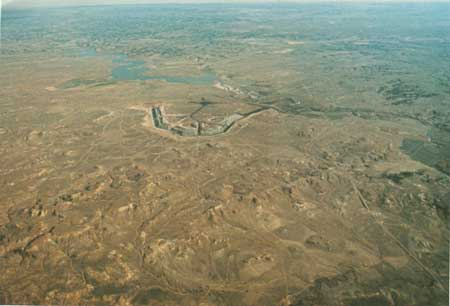
Northeast view of the mile wide Decker coal mine and the Tongue River in the Powder River Basin, southeastern Montana.

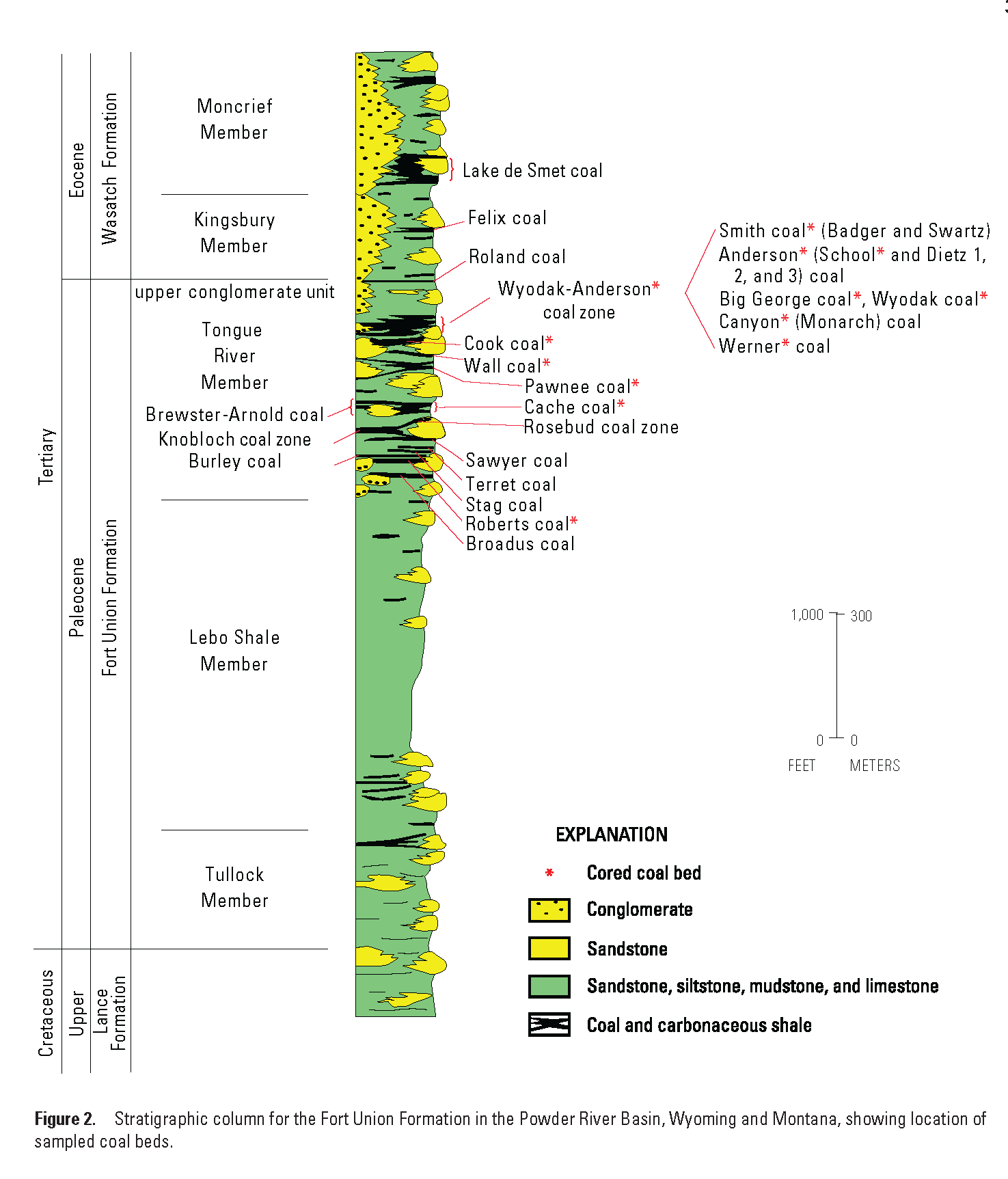
Coal stratigraphy of the Powder River Basin (USGS)

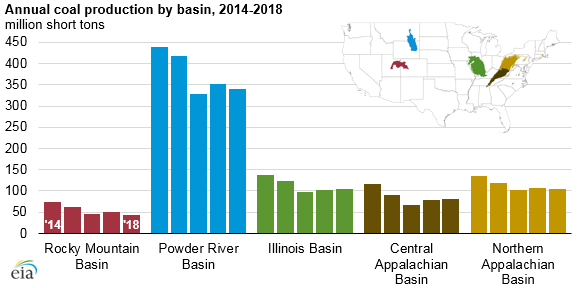
More coal is produced in the Powder River Basin than any other area in the US

Powder River Basin (PRB) coal is classified as "sub-bituminous" and contains an average of approximately 8,500 btu/lb, with low sulfur. Contrast this with eastern, Appalachian bituminous coal containing an average of 12,500 btu/lb and high sulfur. PRB coal was essentially worthless until air pollution emissions from power plants (primarily sulfur dioxide, or "SO_{2}") became a concern. A coal-fired plant designed to burn Appalachian coal must be modified to remove SO_{2} at a cost estimated in 1999 to be around $322 per ton of SO_{2}. If it switched to burning PRB coal, the cost dropped to $113 per ton of SO_{2} removed. Removal is accomplished by installing scrubbers.

The Powder River Basin is the largest coal mining region in the US, but most of the coal is buried too deeply to be economically accessible. The Powder River Basin coal beds are shaped like elongated bowls and as mines expand from east to west in the Powder River Basin, they will be going "down the sides of the bowl". This means that the overburden (rock lying over the coal) will increase as will the stripping ratio (the ratio of rock that needs to be moved).

The United States Geological Survey has conducted a series of studies on the economic accessibility of coal in the major coal-producing regions of the country. The studies typically found that only a small fraction of the coal would be economically accessible at the price then of $10.47/ton. In August 2008, the USGS issued an updated assessment of coal in the Powder River Basin. After considering stripping ratios and production costs, the USGS concluded that at that time, only 6% of the original resource, or 10.1 billion short tons of coal, was economically recoverable. At a price of $60/ton, however, roughly half (48%) of the coal would become economic to produce. Increasing the price paid for coal can increase the amount of economically recoverable coal, but increasing the price of coal also increases its production cost. Because coal is a solid, it cannot be produced from many scattered wells like oil and gas can be. Rather, coal has to be produced from mines that expand slowly by moving massive quantities of overburden.

=== Coal mining ===
Fifteen mines operate in the Powder River Basin, with most of the active mining taking place in drainages of the Cheyenne River. The US uses about 600 million tons of coal a year, with about 40% of the coal coming from the Powder River Basin. The amount of coal coming from the Powder River Basin has been increasing over the last 20 years. In 2019, 43% of the nation's coal was mined in the Powder River basin.

The mines in the Powder River Basin typically have less than 20 years of life remaining. Almost all of the coal in the Powder River Basin is federally-owned, and further mine expansions will require a series of federal and state approvals, as well as large investments in additional mine equipment to begin the excavations.

The majority of the coal mined in the Powder River Basin is part of the Fort Union Formation (Paleocene), with the low sulfur and ash content of the coal in the region making it very desirable. Coal supplies about one-fifth of the United States' electricity supplies. The Powder River Basin mines supply approximately 40% of the coal that fuels those stations (mainly east of the Rocky Mountains) for generating electricity.

The mines work in areas where the stripping ratio is between 1:1 (i.e. one ton of rock for one ton of coal) and 3:1. As the mines expand the stripping ratio will increase. As more rock must be moved (using large electrically powered draglines and diesel and electric mining trucks) the production cost will also increase.

The mines are largely non-union operations with a history of squelching labor activity. According to historian Ryan Driskell Tate, surface mining in remote areas happened to reduce some of the "occupational togetherness" typically associated with coal miners working shoulder-to-shoulder underground in Appalachia. The environmental impact of mining on grass and aquifers has been a concern for surrounding ranchers who organized to resist new mines in the 1970s.

=== Coal mining companies operating in the Powder River Basin ===
Southern Powder River Basin

- Arch Coal (Black Thunder Mine, Coal Creek Mine)
- Black Hills Corporation/Wyodak Resources Development (Wyodak Mine)
- Contura Energy (Belle Ayr Mine, Eagle Butte Mine)
- Navajo Transitional Energy Company (Antelope Mine, Cordero Rojo Mine)
- Kiewit Corporation (Buckskin Mine)
- Peabody Energy (North Antelope Rochelle Mine, Caballo Mine, Rawhide Mine)
- Western Fuels Association (Dry Fork Mine)

Northern Powder River Basin

- Lighthouse Resources (Decker Mine)
- Navajo Transitional Energy Company (Spring Creek)
- Westmoreland Coal Company (Absaloka Mine, Rosebud Mine)

In June 2019, Peabody Energy and Arch Coal announced a joint venture for their combined Powder River Basin assets. In September 2020, Peabody Energy and Arch Coal abandoned their plans for a joint venture following regulatory intervention by the Federal Trade Commission.

=== Power plants fueled from Powder River Basin coal (incomplete list) ===
- James H. Miller Generating Station (Jefferson, Alabama)
- Flint Creek Power Plant – American Electric Power (Arkansas)
- Independence Power Plant - Entergy (Newark, Arkansas)
- White Bluff Power Plant - Entergy (Redfield, Arkansas)
- Plum Point Energy Station, NRG Energy (Osceola, Arkansas)
- Pawnee Station – Xcel Energy (Colorado)
- Comanche Station – Xcel Energy (Colorado)
- Rawhide Energy Station, Wellington, (Colorado)
- Robert W Scherer Power Plant – Georgia Power (Georgia)
- Newton Power Plant – Ameren, Newton, Illinois
- Joppa Generating Station, Vistra Energy - (Joppa, Illinois)
- Warrick Power Plant (Newburgh, Indiana)
- Jeffrey Energy Center (Kansas)
- Big Cajun II – (New Roads, Louisiana)
- Eckert Power Plant – (Lansing, Michigan)
- Erickson Power Plant – (Lansing, Michigan)
- Monroe Power Plant – Detroit Edison (Monroe, Michigan)
- St. Clair Power Plant – Detroit Edison – (East China, Michigan)
- Allen S. King Plant – Xcel Energy (Minnesota)
- Sherburne County (Sherco) Plant – Xcel Energy (Minnesota)
- Sikeston Power Plant (Sikeston, Missouri)
- Gerald Gentleman Station – Nebraska Public Power District (Nebraska)
- Omaha Public Power District – (Omaha, NE) (Nebraska City, Nebraska)
- GREC – Vinita, OK – (Chouteau, Oklahoma)
- J. Robert Welsh Power Plant – American Electric Power (Texas)
- Fayette Power Project – (La Grange, Texas)
- Harrington Station – Xcel Energy (Texas)
- Tolk Station – Xcel Energy (Texas)
- W. A. Parish Station – NRG Energy (Texas)
- Limestone Station – NRG Energy (Texas)
- Centralia Power Plant (Centralia, Washington)
- Edgewater Generating Station, Sheboygan, Wisconsin
- Dry Fork Station - Gillette, Wyoming
- Laramie River Station – (Wheatland, Wyoming)
- Brandon Generating Station – Manitoba Hydro (Brandon, Manitoba)

== Petroleum ==
=== Oil and gas ===
The Powder River Basin also contains major deposits of petroleum, including the giant Salt Creek Oil Field. The oil and gas are produced from rocks ranging from Pennsylvanian to Tertiary, but most comes from sandstones in the thick section of Cretaceous rocks.

There is a recent resurgence in oil and gas production as a result of horizontal drilling and hydraulic fracturing. This resurgence is occurring mainly in the Wyoming portion of the basin, which is historically known as the source of the basin's oil. In 2009, a low of 38,000 barrels of oil per day were produced in the basin. That number has risen dramatically to 78,000 barrels per day in the first quarter of 2014.

The Bell Creek Field is a Lower Cretaceous stratigraphic trap in the Muddy Sandstone. Discovered in 1967 by the Exeter Drilling Co. No. 33-1 Federal-McCarrell well, which found 27 feet of pay at a depth of 4500 ft.

=== Coalbed methane ===
Recent controversy surrounds the extensive coalbed methane extraction in the region. In the last decade, nearly 7000 such wells have been drilled. An extensive network of gas pipelines connecting these wells has been built, along with a series of pressurization plants, as well as power lines to provide electricity to operate the system. In addition, thousands of miles of new access roads have been constructed.

Extracting the gas requires that water be pumped to the surface to release gas trapped in the coal seam. While some of the water is successfully utilized in agriculture production such as livestock water and crop irrigation, some waters are naturally high in salinity and sodium adsorption ratio. There has been controversy on how to best manage these saline waters.

In 2007, Powder River Basin coalbed field produced 442 billion cubic feet of gas, making the field the 3rd largest source of natural gas in the United States.

== Uranium ==
The region also contains major deposits of uranium, contained in sandstones. (See Uranium mining in Wyoming). The Wasatch Formation (Eocene) contains the uranium ore "roll front" type deposits found in the Pumpkin Buttes District. Cameco Corporation subsidiary Power Resources Inc. operates uranium mines in the basin.

== Transportation ==
In Spring 2005, coal extracted from the mines would retail at the mines for around $5 a ton. However, power stations and plants in the eastern United States were paying over $30 a ton – the difference caused by the cost of transportation. (In October 2008, the mine-mouth price of Powder River Basin coal was closer to $15 per ton.) To transport coal from the basin, there is a joint railway line owned by the BNSF Railway and the Union Pacific Railroad running the length of the southern section of the Powder River Basin. A third railroad, the Dakota, Minnesota and Eastern Railroad, faced strong resistance from many parties for its attempts to extend its rail line into the coal mining area, but while the plan was eventually approved by regulating authorities, the project was abandoned after the railroad was purchased by the Canadian Pacific Railway.

In 2013, five coal export terminals were being proposed in the Pacific Northwest to export coal from the Powder River Basin to Asian markets. As of February 2016, some coal terminal proposals had been withdrawn, leaving two with pending applications. The withdrawals were ascribed to loss of demand and consequent lower coal prices.

=== History ===
Originally a single track Burlington Northern Railway line built in stages from 1972 to 1979, the rail line ran south from Donkey Creek Junction in the north 13 miles (21 km) to Caballo, Wyoming; and then for 103 miles (166 km) to Shawnee in Converse County. The Chicago and North Western Railway ran close to the northern section, as did the Union Pacific at Caballo.

In 1982 C&NW and the UP formed Western Railroad Properties, Inc. (WRPI), to acquire half interest in the Burlington Northern coal line from Shawnee Junction to Coal Creek Junction. On December 15, 1986 WPRI purchased 11 miles (18 km) more of BN line from Coal Creek Junction to East Caballo Junction. Beginning June 27, 1983 WPRI constructed six miles (9.7 km) of new railroad from Shawnee Junction. to Shawnee, rebuilt 45 miles (72 km) of C&NW line from Shawnee to Crandall and 56 miles (90 km) of new railroad from Crandall to Joyce, Nebraska. The first commercial train ran on August 16, 1984.

By 1985, the line was single track for almost its entire length, and it was handling 19 million tons of coal. The implementation of the second stage of the Clean Air Act (1990) caused demand for Powder River Basin coal to rise quickly. The C&NW struggled to upgrade capacity to dual track, resulting in numerous failures on the line in 1994, and eventually Union Pacific's purchase of C&NW in 1995. The UP spent $855 million over the next five years expanding capacity over its entire network to handle coal shipments from the PRB. By 2005 the Joint Line capacity had grown to handle an all-time record 325 million tons, and was either dual or three track capacity for its entire length.

Due to various trackage and locomotive failures on the Joint Line in late 2004 and early 2005, the line failed to deliver the amount of contracted coal supplies, and electricity rates increased by 15 percent. Coal customers threatened to evaluate alternate sources of energy and transportation, including the Arkansas Electric Cooperative Corporation. As a result, the 280-mile (450 km) expansion of the Dakota, Minnesota and Eastern Railroad line was approved by the Surface Transportation Board. In 2006 UP and BNSF announced a $100 million investment to provide three track capacity for the entire length of the Joint Line plus a fourth track added over the steepest sections, including Logan Hill. These improvements will enable the Joint Line to handle over 400 million tons of coal.

In 2006, Union Pacific set a record by hauling 194 million tons of coal – an 8% increase compared with 2005 tonnage. The company achieved this by increasing train size, with trains averaging more than 15,000 tons, a 200-ton weight increase compared with fourth-quarter 2005's average. In early 2016 it was reported that 80 to 100 trains of coal were being shipped from the Powder river basin every day. In 2019 train loadings averaged about 50 per day.

== See also ==
- High Plains (United States)
- Thunder Basin National Grassland
