= List of coal mines in the United States =

The following table lists the coal mines in the United States that produced at least 4,000,000 short tons of coal.

According to the U.S. Energy Information Administration (EIA), there were 853 coal mines in the U.S. in 2015, producing a total of 896,941,000 short tons of coal.

Name	Owner	Type	State	Short tons (2017)	Image
North Antelope Rochelle Mine	Peabody Energy Corporation	Surface	Wyoming	101,595,323	
Black Thunder Mine	Arch Coal	Surface	Wyoming	99,450,689	
Antelope Coal Mine	Cloud Peak Energy	Surface	Wyoming	28,503,504	
Eagle Butte Mine	Foundation Coal	Surface	Wyoming	17,264,483	
Cordero Rojo Mine	Cloud Peak Energy	Surface	Wyoming	16,393,569	
Belle Ayr Mine	Foundation Coal	Surface	Wyoming	15,826,344	
Freedom Mine	North American Coal Corporation	Surface	North Dakota	14,716,777	
Buckskin Mine	Kiewit Corporation	Surface	Wyoming	14,517,853	
Mc 1 Mine	M-Class Mining	Underground	Illinois	12,812,197	
Spring Creek Coal Company	Cloud Peak Energy	Surface	Montana	12,725,656	
Bailey Mine	CONSOL Energy	Underground	Pennsylvania	12,123,618	
Marshall County Mine	Marshall County Coal Company	Underground	West Virginia	11,653,535	
Caballo Mine	Peabody Energy Corporation	Surface	Wyoming	11,125,949	
Kosse Strip	Luminant Mining	Surface	Texas	10,997,088	
Rawhide Mine	Peabody Energy Corporation	Surface	Wyoming	10,346,144	
Enlow Fork Mine	CONSOL Energy	Underground	Pennsylvania	9,180,468	
Coal Creek Mine	Arch Coal	Surface	Wyoming	8,963,048	
River View Mine	River View Coal	Underground	Kentucky	8,961,616	
Rosebud Mine	Westmoreland Coal Company	Surface	Montana	8,630,002	
Bear Run Mine	Peabody Bear Run Mining	Surface	Indiana	7,271,178	
Falkirk Mine	North American Coal Corporation	Surface	North Dakota	7,219,086	
Three Oaks Mine	Luminant Mining	Surface	Texas	7,186,478	
Harrison County Mine	CONSOL Energy	Underground	West Virginia	7,131,341	
Tunnel Ridge Mine	Tunnel Ridge	Underground	West Virginia	6,988,112	
Cumberland Mine	Foundation Coal	Underground	Pennsylvania	6,769,916	
Mach 1 Mine	Mach Mining	Underground	Illinois	6,335,835	
Marion County Mine	CONSOL Energy	Underground	West Virginia	6,114,799	
Ohio County Mine	Ohio County Coal	Underground	West Virginia	6,046,582	
Dry Fork Mine	Western Fuels Association	Surface	Wyoming	6,045,618	
Gibson South	Gibson County Coal	Underground	Indiana	5,955,676	
Sufco	Arch Coal	Underground	Utah	5,883,975	
Bull Mountains Mine No 1	Signal Peak Energy	Underground	Montana	5,883,820	
Century Mine	Murray Energy Corporation	Underground	Ohio	5,676,639	
Buchanan Mine 1	Buchanan Minerals	Underground	Virginia	5,352,731	
San Juan Mine 1	San Juan Coal	Underground	New Mexico	5,327,442	
No 7 Mine	Warrior Met Coal Mining	Underground	Alabama	4,864,828	
El Segundo	El Segundo Coal	Surface	New Mexico	4,855,010	
West Elk Mine	Arch Coal	Underground	Colorado	4,821,281	
Harvey Mine	CONSOL Energy	Underground	Pennsylvania	4,805,028	
Skyline Mine 3	Canyon Fuel Company	Underground	Pennsylvania	4,374,500	
Center Mine	Bni Coal	Surface	North Dakota	4,288,404	
Kemmerer Mine	Chevron Corporation	Surface	Wyoming	4,224,426	
Wyodak Mine	Black Hills Corporation	Surface	Wyoming	4,182,800	
Decker Mine	Decker Coal Company	Surface	Montana	4,158,338	

== See also ==
- Coal mining in the United States
- List of coal-fired power stations in the United States
- List of coal mines in Australia
- List of coal mines in Canada
