= Alpha Natural Resources =

American producer of metallurgical coal

Alpha Metallurgical Resources, Inc.
- Type: Private
- Industry: Metals and mining
- Founded: 2002
- Fate: acquired by Contura Energy
- Headquarters: Kingsport, Tennessee, United States
- Key people: Andy Eidson (CEO, Chairman)
- Products: Coking and steam coal
- Revenue: $3,917.156 mil (2010)▲57% 89% coal,8.5% freight
- Net income: $95.551 mil (2010)▲64.7%
- Total assets: US$5.17928 bil (Dec'10)
- Website: www.alphanr.com

Alpha Metallurgical Resources is a large American producer of metallurgical coal ("met coal") for the industrial production of steel and iron and low-sulfur thermal coal ("steam coal") to fuel steam boilers for the production of electrical power. In November, 2018 the company was acquired by Contura Energy. The company also provides industry services relating to equipment repairs, road construction and logistics, with domestic operations and coal reserves within the states of Virginia and West Virginia. Alpha Natural Resources does not produce all of the coal it sells; much of the coal sold by Alpha Natural Resources is purchased from independent mining operations and then resold in the worldwide market.

The 2009 takeover of Foundation Coal provided Alpha Natural Resources with the ability to directly access the Cumberland Mine Railroad and to rail transport coal in Pennsylvania.

In 2014, Alpha Natural Resources settled on a $27.5 million fine and $200 million to reduce illegal toxic discharges into hundreds of waterways across five Appalachian states. According to the EPA it was the largest environmental fine ever made against a coal company: "This is the largest one, period. It's the biggest case for permit violations for numbers of violations and size of the penalty, which reflects the seriousness of violations."

== Corporate history ==
=== Alpha Natural Resources, Inc ===
==== 2002 ====
Alpha Natural Resources was established in 2002 by management (original CEO Michael Quillen played a major role) and First Reserve Stockholders (though it officially incorporated in November 2004). Around the same time it made its first major acquisition, The Brink's Company's Virginian coal business, for $62.9 million (Virginia is currently a significant source of primary production). Immediately after that it took over Coastal Coal Company (January 2003), followed by American Metals and Coal International's coal business (March) and Mears Enterprises, Inc (November).

Alpha Metallurgical Resources exists today primarily as the result of two mergers, one in July 2009 (Foundation Coal and Alpha Natural Resources, Inc.) and another in January 2011 (US$7.1 billion acquisition of Massey Energy).

==== 2004, IPO ====
Alpha Natural Resources filed for an IPO during December 2004 in an attempt to raise US$250 million to repay debt (strong coal prices also affected the timing of this). At the time, coal was selling for about a quarter of the price of natural gas ($1.5 versus $5.0 per million BTU); however, the ratio has since become much smaller (as of 2010, coal has tripled in price to $4.63/mil BTU while gas is still at $5.189). (Natural gas is used as an alternative to thermal coal in electricity production.)

The takeover of Foundation Coal was a reverse takeover, in that Foundation Coal was the company left standing and it was immediately renamed Alpha Natural Resources. Foundation Coal added 7.5 million tons of annual coal shipments to its Eastern Coal operations, and expanded the company's presence in Wyoming. Although acquisitions helped Alpha expand rapidly since its founding in 2002, it also burdened it with debt ($185.6 million in 2004, $754.15 December 31, 2010).

==== 2011, Massey Energy acquisition ====
On January 31, 2011 Alpha acquired coal producer Massey Energy for US$7.1 billion, completed in June 2011, creating the second biggest coal miner by market capitalization. The merged company (54% owned by Alpha Natural Resources) would be the leading producer of metallurgical coal in the US and have the second largest reserves of coal (5.1 billion tons). Merging operations with Massey is estimated to reduce combined operating costs by $150 million. 7,000 of the 14,000 employees are in West Virginia. In 2010, demand for thermal coal rose while metallurgical coal demand was flat; it made up only 14% of coal sales, down from 17% in 2009.

Massey Energy had become a takeover target after suffering large income losses and negative publicity following an explosion at West Virginia's Upper Big Branch mine that killed 29 employees. Direct costs related to the incident amounted to $128.9 million. Federal regulators and the Mine Safety and Health Administration blamed the explosion on Massey's poor practices; however, the company contested the findings, citing a methane leak.

The corporate takeover of Massey Energy was completed in June 2011 after shareholders of both companies voted for the merger. 99% of Massey shareholders voted for the deal (77% of them voted), while 98% of Alpha's shareholders supported it (83% of them voted). Alpha secured $3.3 billion in financing for the takeover from Citigroup and JPMorgan Chase. The combined entity will be the world's number three producer of metallurgical coal, behind BHP and Teck Resources.

Alpha settled Massey's Upper Big Branch Mine disaster liabilities with the U.S. Attorney for $209 million on December 6, 2011. The settlement included $41.5 million to the survivors and families of the deceased. The Mine Safety and Health Administration additionally assessed a $10.8 million fine for 369 citations and orders, the largest fine for a mine accident in US history.

==== 2012 election year layoffs ====
On September 18, 2012, Alpha announced a plan to idle eight coal mines and to lay off 800 employees before the November 2012 federal elections in the United States. The plan would reduce Alpha's yearly coal production by ~16 million tons and reduce costs by $150 million.

==== 2014, settlement with the EPA ====
In 2014, Alpha settled on a $27.5 million fine and $200 million to reduce illegal toxic discharges into hundreds of waterways across five Appalachian states. According to the EPA, it was the largest environmental fine ever made against a coal company: "This is the largest one, period. It's the biggest case for permit violations for numbers of violations and size of the penalty, which reflects the seriousness of violations."

==== 2015, bankruptcy ====
The firm suffered four years of losses, laid off 4,000 workers, and closed all but 50 mines. Due to its "abnormally low" stock price, Alpha was delisted from the NYSE on July 16, 2015. With debts of $3 billion dating from its acquisition of Massey Energy for $7.1 billion in 2011 the firm filed for Chapter 11 bankruptcy on August 3, 2015.

Alpha had used more than $1 billion in "self-bonding" to guarantee it could pay for its mine reclamation obligations under the Surface Mining Control and Reclamation Act of 1977. After the firm declared bankruptcy, the Wyoming Department of Environmental Quality agreed to accept $61 million in place of the firm's $411 million in self-bonding liability to the state. In West Virginia, Alpha's bankruptcy plan is to offer $240 million in collateral for its self-bonding liabilities and to continue holding $100 million in liability without collateral. The plan would commit $209 million to reclamation in Illinois, Kentucky, Tennessee, Virginia, and West Virginia. Bankruptcy negotiations are complicated by large hedge funds, such as Highbridge Capital Management and Davidson Kempner Capital Management, who own both the company's debt and liens on Alpha's operating cash.

On July 26, 2016, the company successfully emerged from bankruptcy as a privately held company.

== Operations ==
Only about 40% of coal is produced directly by the company, and 60% comes from subsidiaries. Three-fourths of the company's 60 mines are underground operations. In 2008 the biggest source of coal production, the Powder River Basin (53% = 49.2mt), was home to only 32% of coal reserves (behind U.S. Northern Appalachia (35% = 800mt) and Central Appalachia (32%, thermal coal). After the merger with Massey, the company controlled 150 coal mines and 40 preparation plants, which was up significantly from the 65 mines under its control at the end of 2007. For 2011, Massey expected to ship 10 to 14 million tons of metallurgical coal, about the same as Alpha (in 2010 this was 11.88 million tons or 14% of total production). In its last annual report (2009) Massey Energy reported coal sales of 38 million tons (ranking sixth in the US), compared to 84.8 million tons sold by Alpha Natural Resources in 2010. In the fourth quarter of 2010 Massey Energy had a coal shipment shortfall of 1.4 million tons, half of which was due to rail problems, and the other half a result of misproduction.

=== Headquarters ===
Alpha's corporate office building in Bristol, Virginia was reportedly sold in February 2015 for $28 million to One Alpha Place LLC, registered in Delaware and owned by the publicly traded Kuwait Petroleum Corporation. The deal will apparently have no impact on the building's sole tenant (Alpha), which at the time had 22 years remaining on a 25-year lease.

=== Mines ===
Before the merger with Massey Energy, Alpha had over 60 active mines in four US states. After the merger the number of mines reached 110-150. Notable ones include Belle Ayr Mine and Eagle Butte Mine (both in Wyoming).

In Coal River East, Kingston Mining, located in Kingston, West Virginia, has some of the world's most sought-after met coal.

Currently, Alpha affiliates operate approximately 60 mines and 22 prep plants.

Black Bear Surface Mines was previously operated, but more recently is one of the company's two land restoration projects. The project was featured on the Discovery Channel.

== Competition ==
- Cliffs Natural Resources, a coal producer of comparable size
- Patriot Coal Corporation, a producer that also mines in Appalachia and West Virginia
