= Foundation Coal =

American coal mining company

Foundation Coal Holdings, Inc. (Data as of 2008 Annual Report)
- Company type: Public
- Traded as: NYSE: FCL
- Industry: Mining
- Headquarters: Linthicum Heights, Maryland, United States
- Products: Coal
- Revenue: $1,690.1 million USD
- Operating income: $316.4 million USD (EBITDA)
- Net income: $11.6 million USD
- Number of employees: 3,300
- Parent: Alpha Natural Resources

Foundation Coal Holdings, Inc. was a large American coal mining company. Until its July 31, 2009 merger with Alpha Natural Resources to form the third largest American coal company, the company was publicly traded on the New York Stock Exchange under the symbol FCL. With corporate offices in Linthicum Heights, Maryland, the former Foundation Coal operates coal mines in Pennsylvania, West Virginia and Wyoming, and was, prior to its merger with Alpha Natural Resources, the fourth-largest American coal producer by tonnage.

Foundation Coal, through subsidiaries, owns and operates several of the largest coal mines in the United States, including:

- Belle Ayr Mine, Wyoming: 26.6 million short tons produced in 2007, ranked 7th
- Eagle Butte Mine, Wyoming: 25.0 million short tons produced in 2007, ranked 9th
- Cumberland Mine, Pennsylvania: 7.3 million short tons produced in 2007, ranked 21st
- Emerald Mine No 1, Pennsylvania: 6.7 million short tons produced in 2007, ranked 34th
