= Cumberland Mine Railroad =

Mine railroad in Pennsylvania, US

Coordinates: 39°47′46″N 80°09′25″W

Overview
- Fleet: 1 EMD SD40; 2 EMD SD38-2
- Parent company: Iron Senergy Holding LLC
- Headquarters: Louisville, KY
- Key people: Justin F. Thompson
- Reporting mark: CMYX
- Locale: Eastern, Pennsylvania, United States
- Dates of operation: 1976–present
- Predecessors: Contura Energy, U.S. Steel

Technical
- Track gauge: 4 ft 8 1/2 in (1,435 mm) standard gauge
- Length: 17 miles (27 km)

Other
- Website: ironsenergy.com/facilities/

The Cumberland Mine Railroad is a private carrier mine railroad serving the Cumberland Coal Resources mine near Waynesburg, Pennsylvania.

Operations on the mine and associated railroad began in November 1976. The line was originally developed by United States Steel as a source of steam coal for export to Canada. Subsequently, the mine and railroad have changed hands several times. As of January 2021 they are owned by Iron Senergy Holding LLC, and this coal is being consumed by domestic power plants.

The tracks extend 17 miles from the preparation plant (located about 2 miles west of Kirby) to the Alicia Dock barge-loading facility on the Monongahela River north of Greensboro. The barges deliver the loads to the Norfolk Southern at East Millsboro.

It is an isolated railroad, not connected to the North American railroad network. Rolling stock was delivered by the Norfolk Southern to a siding in Poland Mines, and then taken by truck and trailer to the railroad's dockside terminus near Masontown.

One EMD SD-40 and two SD38-2 locomotives comprise the power roster. Most trips convey roughly 35 to 38 (38 cars is the max amount capable of fitting in the loading/unloading facilities) leased and owned coal cars, often with two locomotives operating in "push-pull" mode.
