= Eagle Butte Mine =

Open pit coal mine near Gillette, Wyoming

Eagle Butte
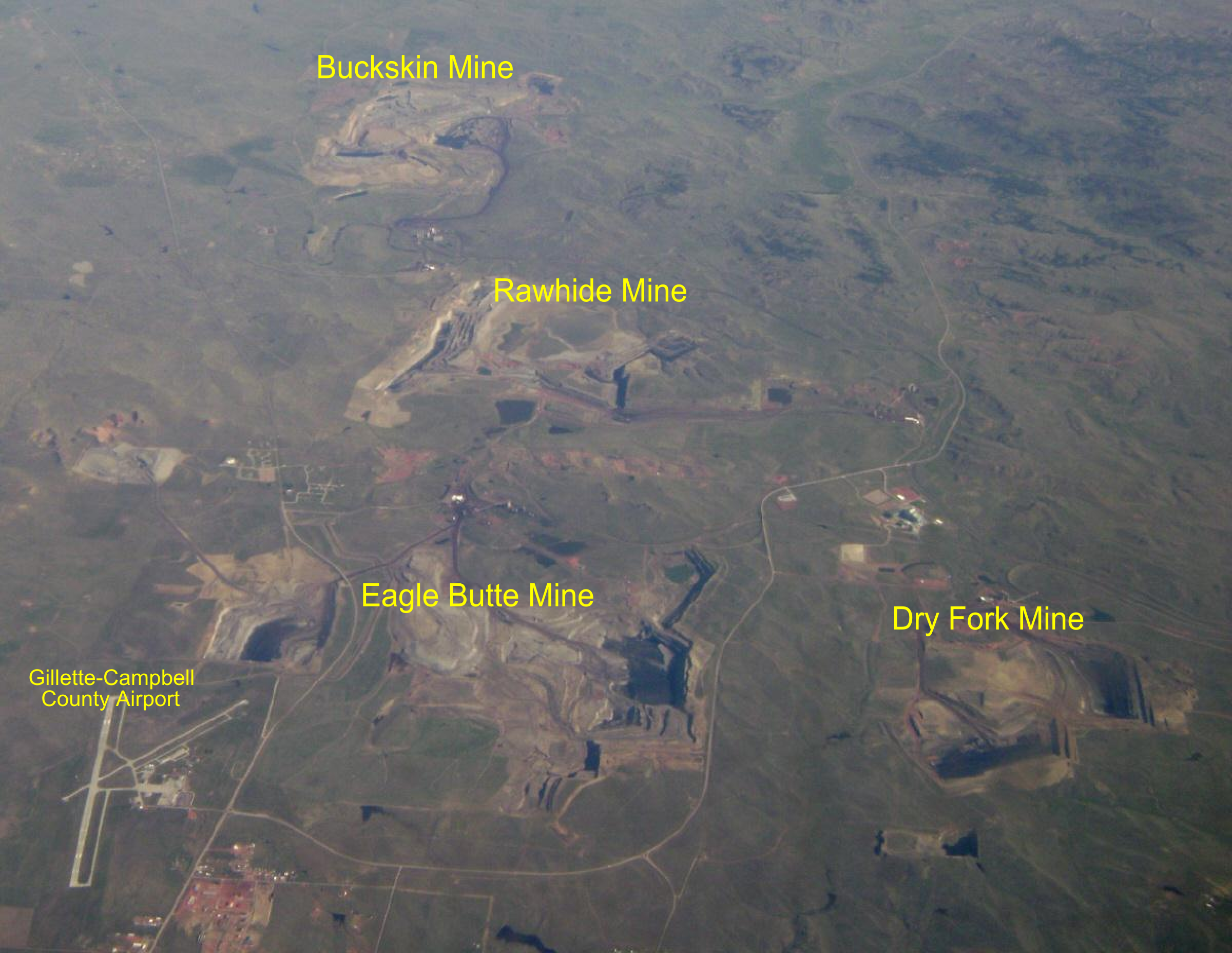
- Coal mines north and east of Gillette–Campbell County Airport, including the Eagle Butte Mine

- Location in Wyoming
- Location: Wyoming, United States; 44°21′20″N 105°29′56″W
- Products: Coal
- Production: 15,062,345 short tons
- Financial year: 2022
- Opened: 1978
- Company: Eagle Specialty Materials LLC
- Website: https://pemining.com/eagle-butte-1
- Acquired: 2019

The Eagle Butte mine is a coal mine located 7 miles (11 km) north of Gillette, Wyoming in the United States in the coal-rich Powder River Basin. The mine is an open pit, "truck and shovel", mine producing a low-sulfur, sub-bituminous coal from the Roland and Smith seams that is used for domestic energy generation. Coal produced by the mine is shipped to its customers via railroad. The mine is owned and operated by Eagle Specialty Materials LLC after being acquired from Blackjewel LLC in 2019.

As of 2009, Eagle Butte had reserves of 471,000,000 short tons (427,000,000 t) of sub-bituminous coal and a maximum permitted production capacity of 35,000,000 short tons (32,000,000 t) per year. Typical annual production has been in 20-25 million ton range for the last several years though. The average quality of the coal shipped from Eagle Butte is 8,400 BTU/lb, 0.34% Sulfur, 4.50% Ash, and 1.90% Sodium (of the ash). Train loading operations at the mine are done with a batch weigh bin system that is coupled to a "weigh-in-motion" track scale system. Silo capacity at the mine's rail loop, which can accommodate up to 5 unit trains, is 48,000 tons. In 2008, the mine produced just over 20,500,000 short tons (18,600,000 t) of coal, making it the 9th-largest producer of coal in the United States. In 2022, this had dropped to just over 15 million short tons of coal. However, this still made it the 5th-largest coal mine in the US.

== History ==
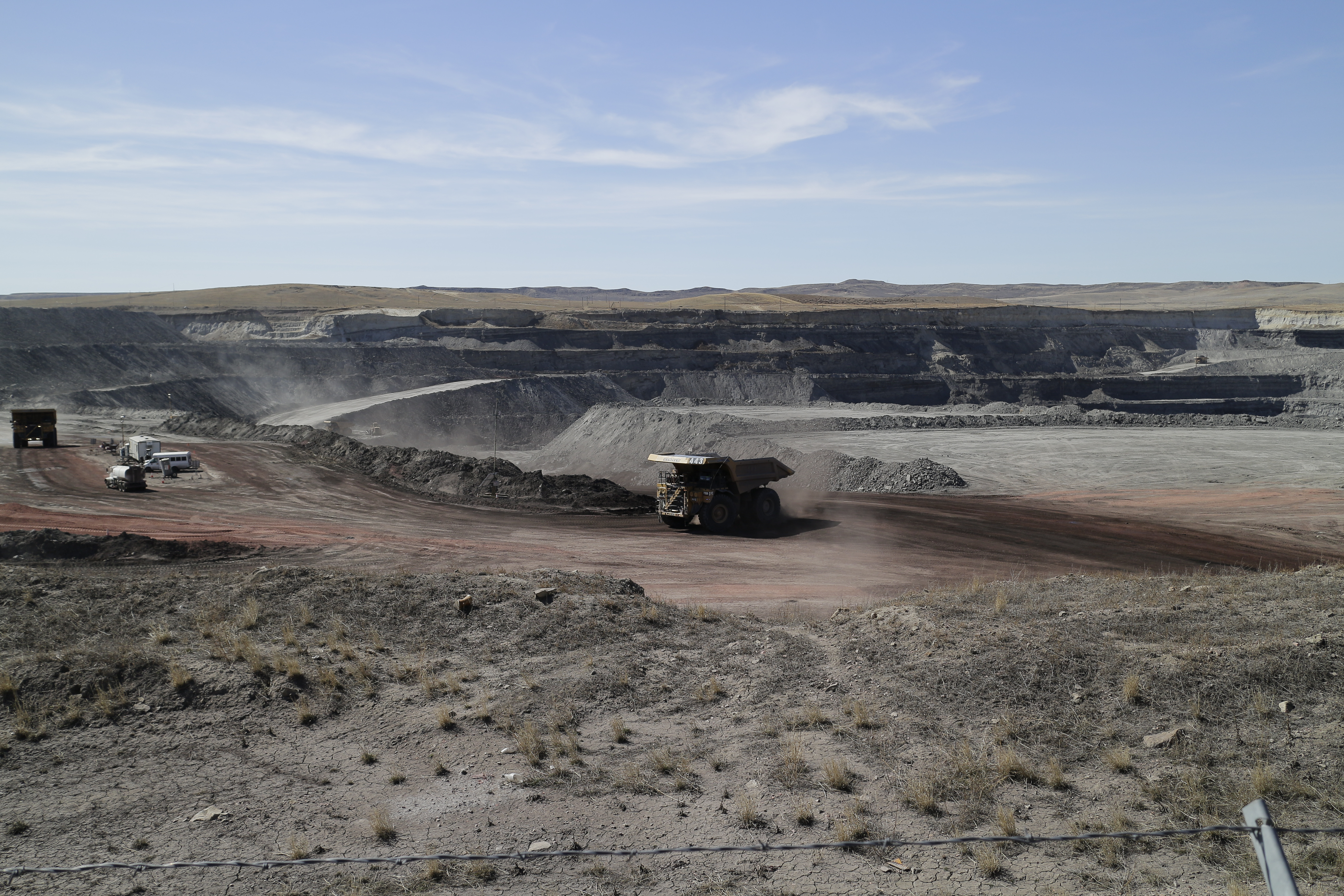
Eagle Butte Mine seen from the visitor overlook platform

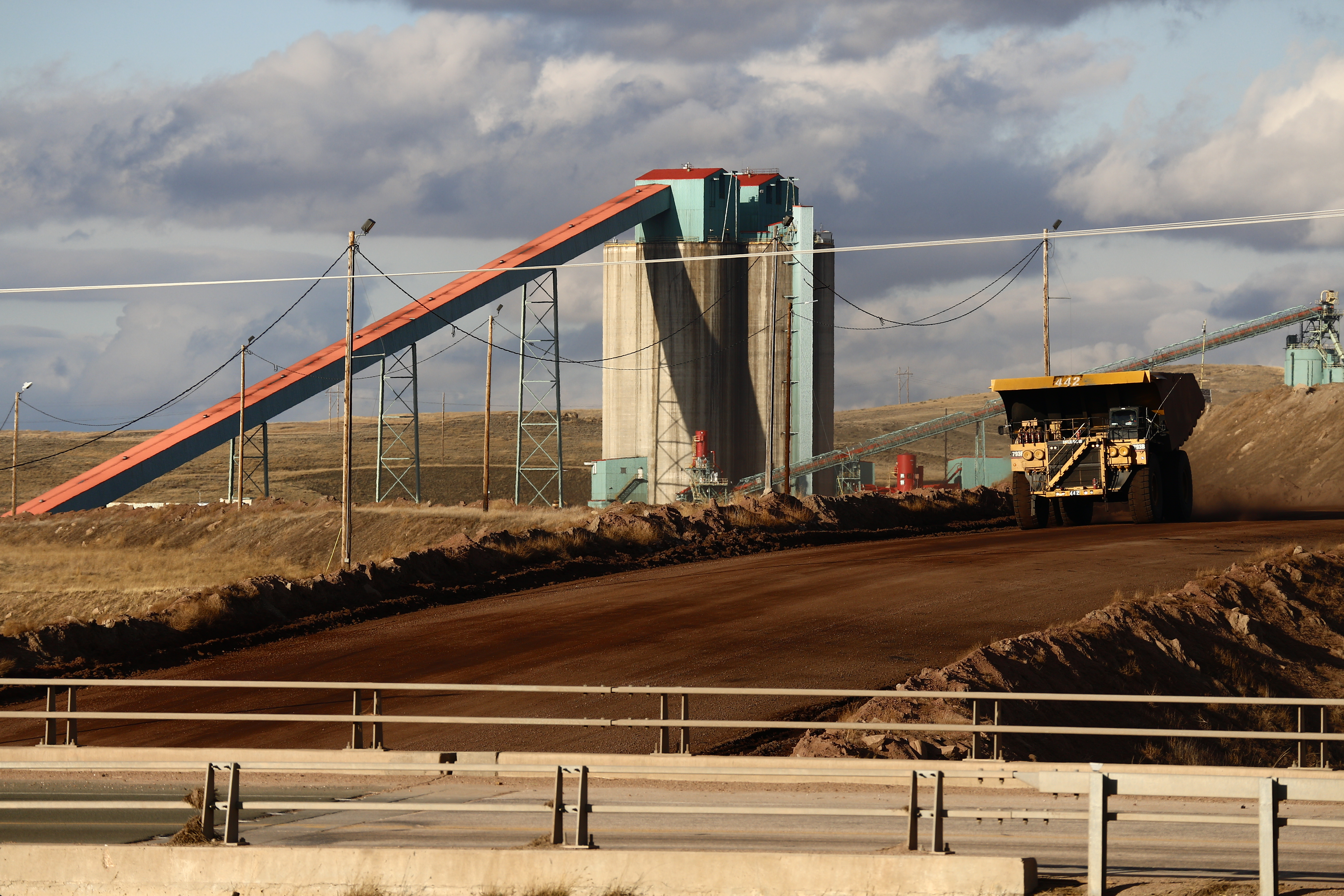
An empty haul truck heading back into the pit passing by coal silos

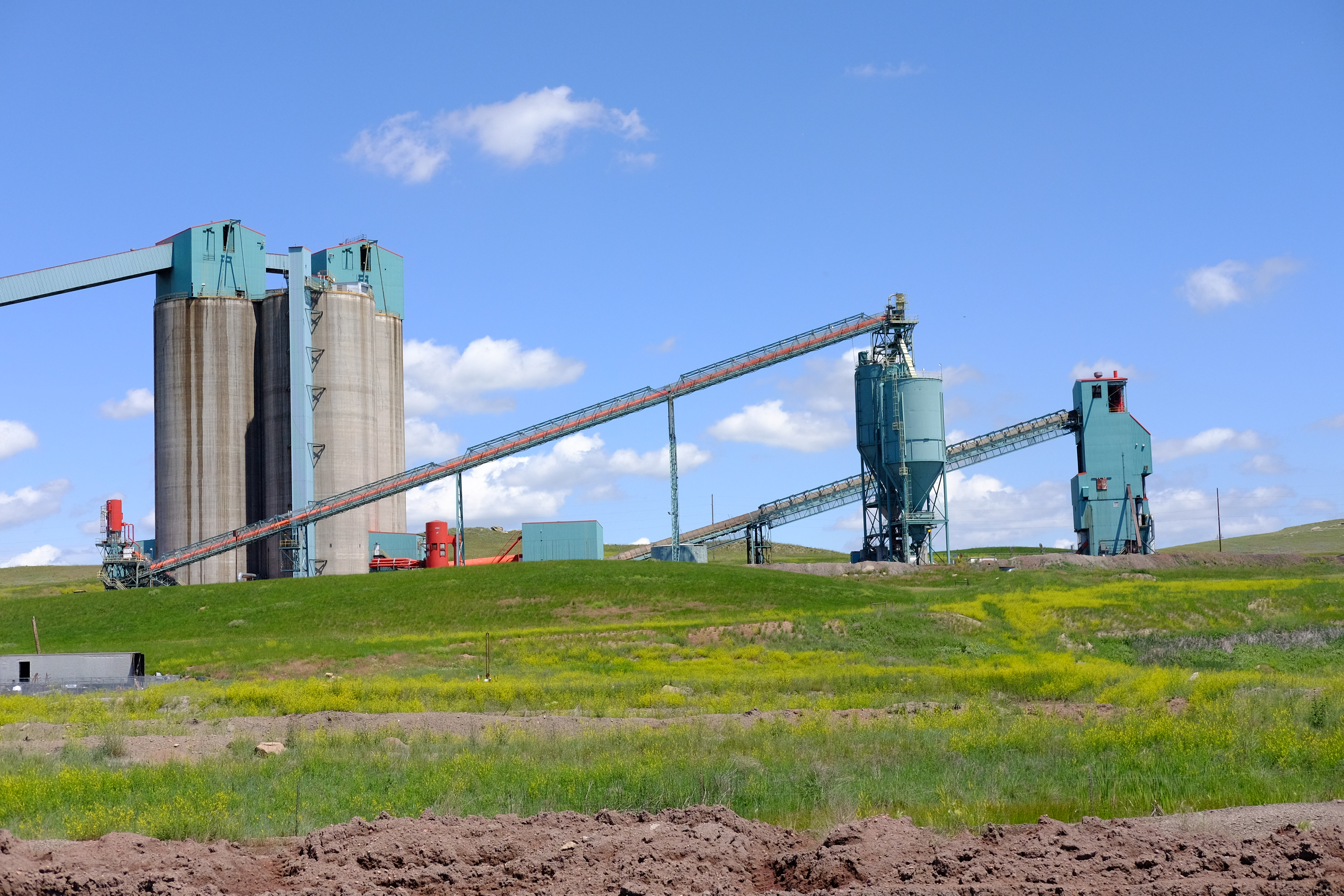
Coal silos in Eagle Butte Mine

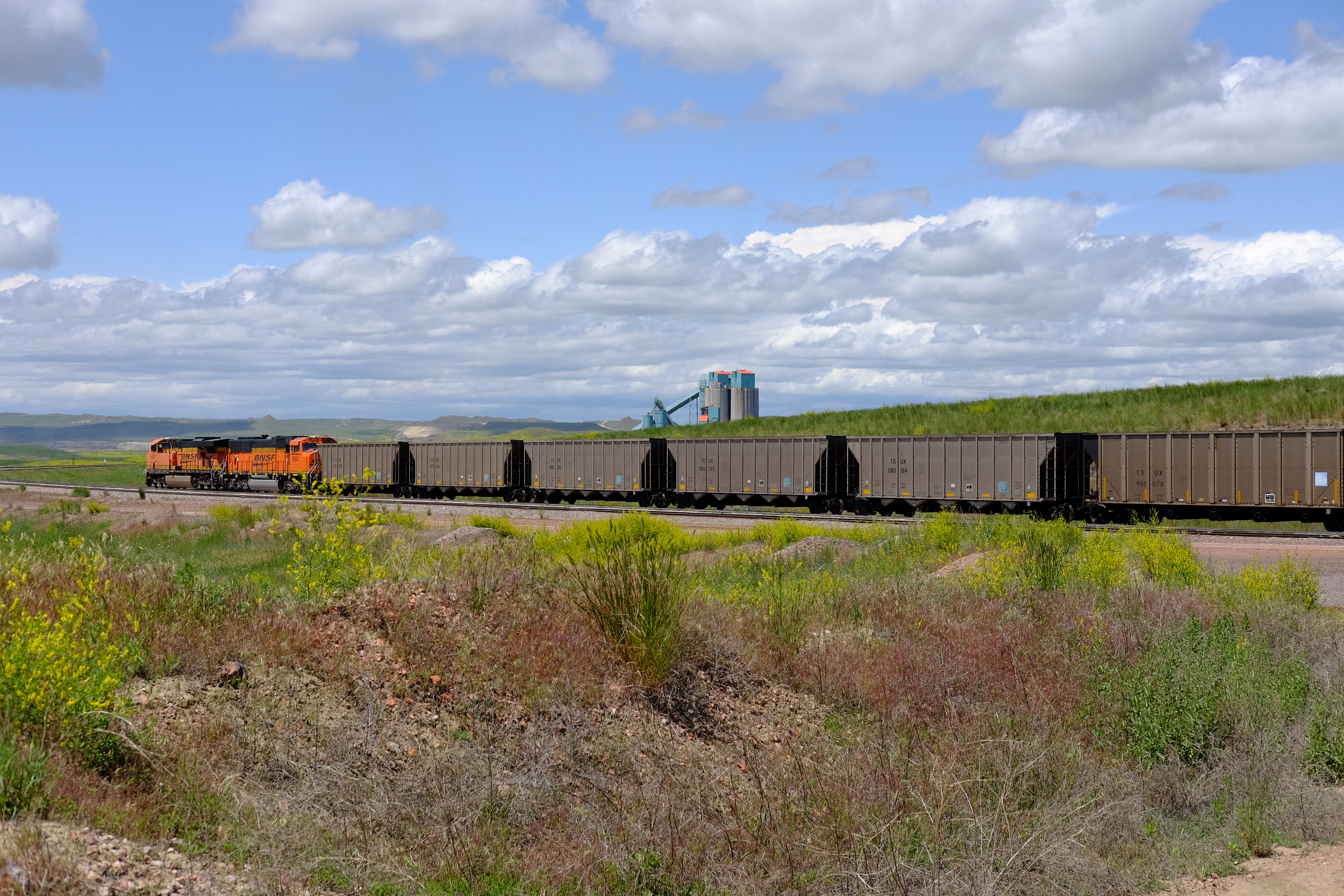
Train heading along a rail spur in Eagle Butte Mine to be loaded with coal

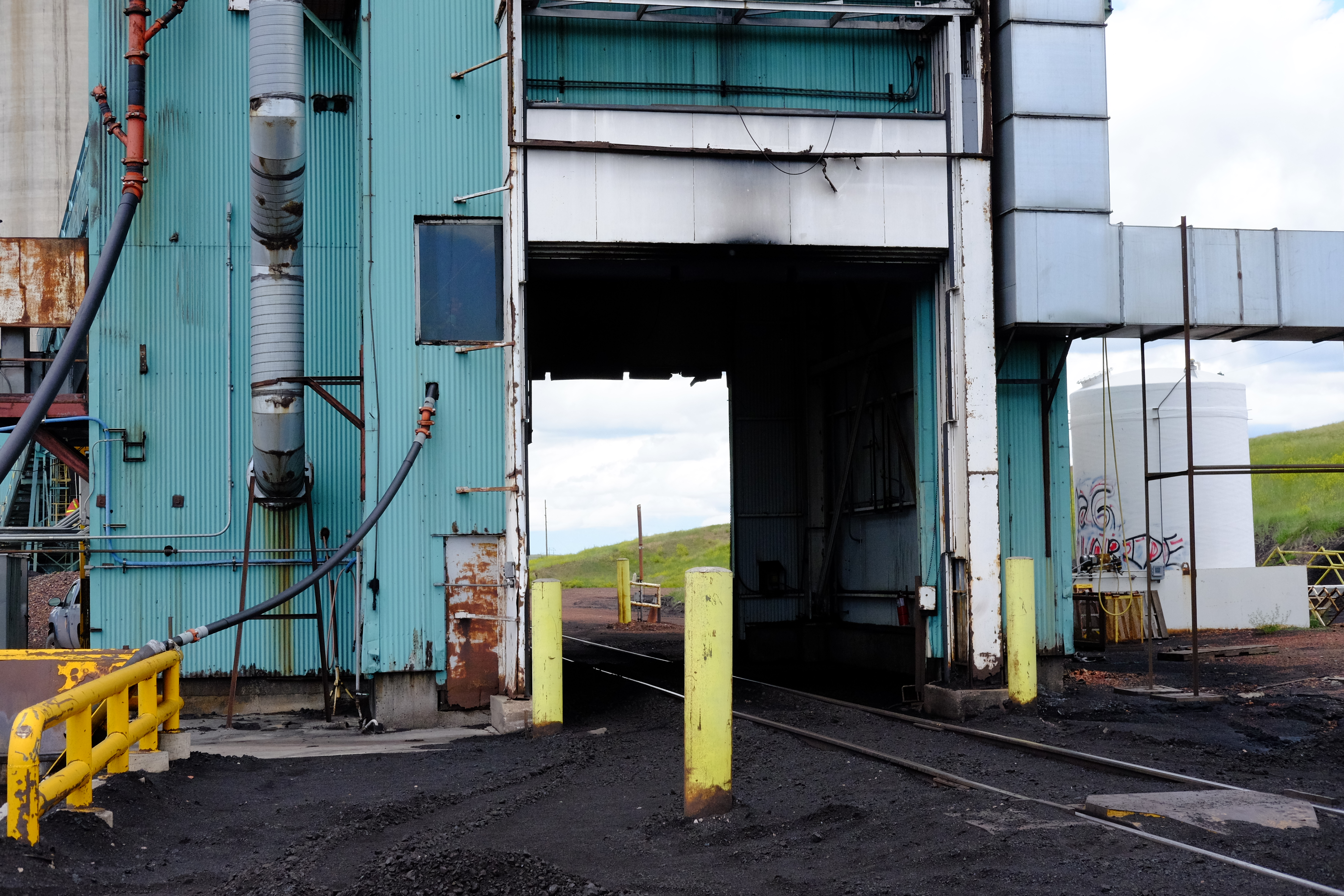
Coal is loaded on freight cars as they pass through the silo

The Eagle Butte Mine shipped its first train of coal in 1978 after beginning pre-production work in 1976. Since mining operations began, the mine has shipped over 521,000,000 short tons (473,000,000 t) of coal to its customers. Eagle Butte mine has changed hands many times through mergers and sales. Previous owners include AMAX, Cyprus AMAX, RAG and Foundation Coal.

In 2005, the Eagle Butte mine was awarded two awards from the Wyoming Department of Environmental Quality for Excellence in Surface Mining Reclamation and Innovation. Eagle Butte was selected to receive these awards because of the superior quality of shrub patches that the mine had established on its reclamation.

On July 1, 2019 CEO Jeffery Hoop announced that Blackjewel LLC, the operator of Eagle Butte had filed for bankruptcy and closed the mine. According to the Casper Star-Tribune, court documents show that Blackjewel owes $500 million in liabilities, including $6 million to employees. This was after Blackjewel was denied $20 million in financing by the United Bank of West Virginia.

On August 4, 2019 Contura Energy Inc. announced that they won the bid to purchase the Eagle Butte and Belle Ayr mines from Blackjewel. However, it was unclear if and when any of the mines would reopen. On October 21, 2019 Eagle Specialty Materials put out an announcement that it had closed its deal to buy the Eagle Butte and Belle Ayr coal mines from Contura, after the latter was unable to come to an agreement with the federal government about unpaid royalties needed to close the previous deal.

== Production ==
Year	Coal production (short tons)	Employees
2022	15,062,345	267
2021	13,549,294	222
2020	12,303,698	229
2019	11,642,248	216
2018	17,055,796	306
2017	17,264,483	303
2016	19,003,005	291
2015	19,649,723	290
2014	20,690,237	286
2013	19,904,433	255
2012	22,466,733	301
2011	25,365,054	310
2010	23,225,757	298
2009	21,496,124	280
2008	20,443,413	274
2007	25,010,089	275
2006	25,355,158	270
2005	24,137,448	242
2004	22,997,687	238
2003	24,549,824	236
2002	24,888,124	236
2001	24,826,910	236
2000	18,622,992	181
1999	24,826,910	186
1998	18,074,546	184
1997	17,921,000	188
1996	15,642,744	184
1995	16,942,000	180
1994	17,161,000	201
1993	16,838,000	227
1992	13,669,000	217
1991	13,922,000	219
1990	15,402,000	246
1989	13,606,000	265
1988	12,915,000	271
1987	12,977,000	299
1986	12,000,000	299
1985	11,808,000	314
1984	13,365,000	310
1983	11,030,000	308
1982	9,100,000	
1981	8,400,000	
1980	8,500,000	
1979	4,500,000	
1978	500,000	
