= Common carrier =

Term in common law legal systems for transporters of goods/people

A common carrier in common law countries (corresponding to a public carrier in some civil law systems, usually called simply a carrier) is a person or company that transports goods or people for any person or company and is responsible for any possible loss of the goods during transport. A common carrier offers its services to the general public under license or authority provided by a regulatory body, which has usually been granted "ministerial authority" by the legislation that created it. The regulatory body may create, interpret, and enforce its regulations upon the common carrier (subject to judicial review) with independence and finality as long as it acts within the bounds of the enabling legislation.

A common carrier (also called a public carrier in British English) is distinguished from a contract carrier, which is a carrier that transports goods for only a certain number of clients and that can refuse to transport goods for anyone else, and from a private carrier. A common carrier holds itself out to provide service to the general public without discrimination (to meet the needs of the regulator's quasi-judicial role of impartiality toward the public's interest) for the "public convenience and necessity." A common carrier must further demonstrate to the regulator that it is "fit, willing, and able" to provide those services for which it is granted authority. Common carriers typically transport persons or goods according to defined and published routes, time schedules, and rate tables upon the approval of regulators. Public airlines, railroads, bus lines, taxicab companies, phone companies, internet service providers, cruise ships, motor carriers (i.e., canal operating companies, trucking companies), and other freight companies generally operate as common carriers. Under US law, an ocean freight forwarder cannot act as a common carrier.

The term common carrier is a common law term and is seldom used in Continental Europe because it has no exact equivalent in civil-law systems. In Continental Europe, the functional equivalent of a common carrier is referred to as a public carrier or simply as a carrier. However, public carrier in Continental Europe is different from public carrier in British English in which it is a synonym for contract carrier.

== General ==
Although common carriers generally transport people or goods, in the United States the term may also refer to telecommunications service providers and public utilities. In certain U.S. states, amusement parks that operate roller coasters and comparable rides have been found to be common carriers; a famous example is Disneyland.

Regulatory bodies may also grant carriers the authority to operate under contract with their customers instead of under common carrier authority, rates, schedules and rules. These regulated carriers, known as contract carriers, must demonstrate that they are "fit, willing and able" to provide service, according to standards enforced by the regulator. However, contract carriers are specifically not required to demonstrate that they will operate for the "public convenience and necessity." A contract carrier may be authorized to provide service over either fixed routes and schedules, i.e., as regular route carrier or on an ad hoc basis as an irregular route carrier.

It should be mentioned that the carrier refers only to the person (legal or physical) that enters into a contract of carriage with the shipper. The carrier does not necessarily have to own or even be in the possession of a means of transport. Unless otherwise agreed upon in the contract, the carrier may use whatever means of transport approved in its operating authority, as long as it is the most favorable from the cargo interests' point of view. The carriers' duty is to get the goods to the agreed destination within the agreed time or within reasonable time.

The person that is physically transporting the goods on a means of transport is referred to as the "actual carrier". When a carrier subcontracts with another provider, such as an independent contractor or a third-party carrier, the common carrier is said to be providing "substituted service". The same person may hold both common carrier and contract carrier authority. In the case of a rail line in the US, the owner of the property is said to retain a "residual common carrier obligation", unless otherwise transferred (such as in the case of a commuter rail system, where the authority operating passenger trains may acquire the property but not this obligation from the former owner), and must operate the line if service is terminated.

In contrast, private carriers are not licensed to offer a service to the public. Private carriers generally provide transport on an irregular or ad hoc basis for their owners.

Carriers were very common in rural areas prior to motorised transport. Regular services by horse-drawn vehicles would ply to local towns, taking goods to market or bringing back purchases for the village. If space permitted, passengers could also travel.

Cases have also established limitations to the common carrier designation. In a case concerning a hot air balloon, Grotheer v. Escape Adventures, Inc., the court affirmed a hot air balloon was not a common carrier, holding the key inquiry in determining whether or not a transporter can be classified as a common carrier is whether passengers expect the transportation to be safe because the operator is reasonably capable of controlling the risk of injury.

== Telecommunications ==
In the United States, telecommunications carriers are regulated by the Federal Communications Commission under title II of the Communications Act of 1934.

The Telecommunications Act of 1996 made extensive revisions to the "Title II" provisions regarding common carriers and repealed the judicial 1982 AT&T consent decree (often referred to as the Modification of Final Judgment) that effectuated the breakup of AT&T's Bell System. Further, the Act gives telephone companies the option of providing video programming on a common carrier basis or as a conventional cable television operator. If it chooses the former, the telephone company will face less regulation but will also have to comply with FCC regulations requiring what the Act refers to as "open video systems". The Act generally bars, with certain exceptions including most rural areas, acquisitions by telephone companies of more than a 10 percent interest in cable operators (and vice versa) and joint ventures between telephone companies and cable systems serving the same areas.

== Internet service providers ==
Using provisions of the Communications Act of 1934, the FCC classified Internet service providers as common carriers, effective June 12, 2015, for the purpose of enforcing net neutrality. Led by the Trump administration's appointed commissioner Ajit Pai, on December 14, 2017 the FCC reversed its rules on net neutrality, effectively revoking common carrier status as a requirement for Internet service providers. Following this, in 2018 the U.S. Senate narrowly passed a non-binding resolution aiming to reverse the FCC's decision and restore FCC's net neutrality rules. On 25 April 2024, the FCC voted 3–2 to reinstate net neutrality in the United States by reclassifying the Internet under Title II. However, legal challenges filed by ISPs resulted in an appeals court order that stays the net neutrality rules until the court makes a final ruling, with the court opining that the ISPs are likely to prevail over the FCC on the merits.

== Pipelines ==
In the United States, many oil, gas and CO_{2} pipelines are common carriers. The Federal Energy Regulatory Commission (FERC) regulates rates charged and other tariff terms imposed by interstate common carrier pipelines. Intrastate common carrier pipeline tariffs are often regulated by state agencies. The US and many states have delegated the power of eminent domain to common carrier gas pipelines.

== Legal implications ==
Common carriers are subject to special laws and regulations that differ depending on the means of transport used, e.g. sea carriers are often governed by quite different rules from road carriers or railway carriers. In common law jurisdictions as well as under international law, a common carrier is absolutely liable for goods carried by it, with four exceptions:

- An act of nature
- An act of the public enemies
- Fault or fraud by the shipper
- An inherent defect in the goods

A sea carrier may also, according to the Hague-Visby Rules, escape liability on other grounds than the above-mentioned, e.g. a sea carrier is not liable for damages to the goods if the damage is the result of a fire on board the ship or the result of a navigational error committed by the ship's master or other crewmember.

Carriers typically incorporate further exceptions into a contract of carriage, often specifically claiming not to be a common carrier.

An important legal requirement for common carrier as public provider is that it cannot discriminate, that is refuse the service unless there is some compelling reason. As of 2007, the status of Internet service providers as common carriers and their rights and responsibilities is widely debated (network neutrality).

The term common carrier does not exist in continental Europe but is distinctive to common law systems, particularly law systems in the US.

In Ludditt v Ginger Coote Airways the Privy Council (Lord Macmillan, Lord Wright, Lord Porter and Lord Simonds) held the liability of a public or common carrier of passengers is only to carry with due care. This is more limited than that of a common carrier of goods. The complete freedom of a carrier of passengers at common law to make such contracts as he thinks fit was not curtailed by the Railway and Canal Traffic Act 1854, and a specific contract that enlarges, diminishes or excludes his duty to take care (e.g., by a condition that the passenger travels "at his own risk against all casualties") cannot be pronounced to be unreasonable if the law authorises it. There was nothing in the provisions of the Canadian Transport Act 1938 section 25 that would invalidate a provision excluding liability. Grand Trunk Railway Co of Canada v Robinson [1915] A.C. 740 was followed and Peek v North Staffordshire Railway 11 E.R. 1109 was distinguished.

== See also ==
- Federal Communications Commission
- Interstate Commerce Act
- Interstate Commerce Commission
- Motor Carrier Act of 1980
- Multimodal transport
- Network neutrality
- Private carrier
