= Wyodak Mine =

Coal mine in Wyoming, United States

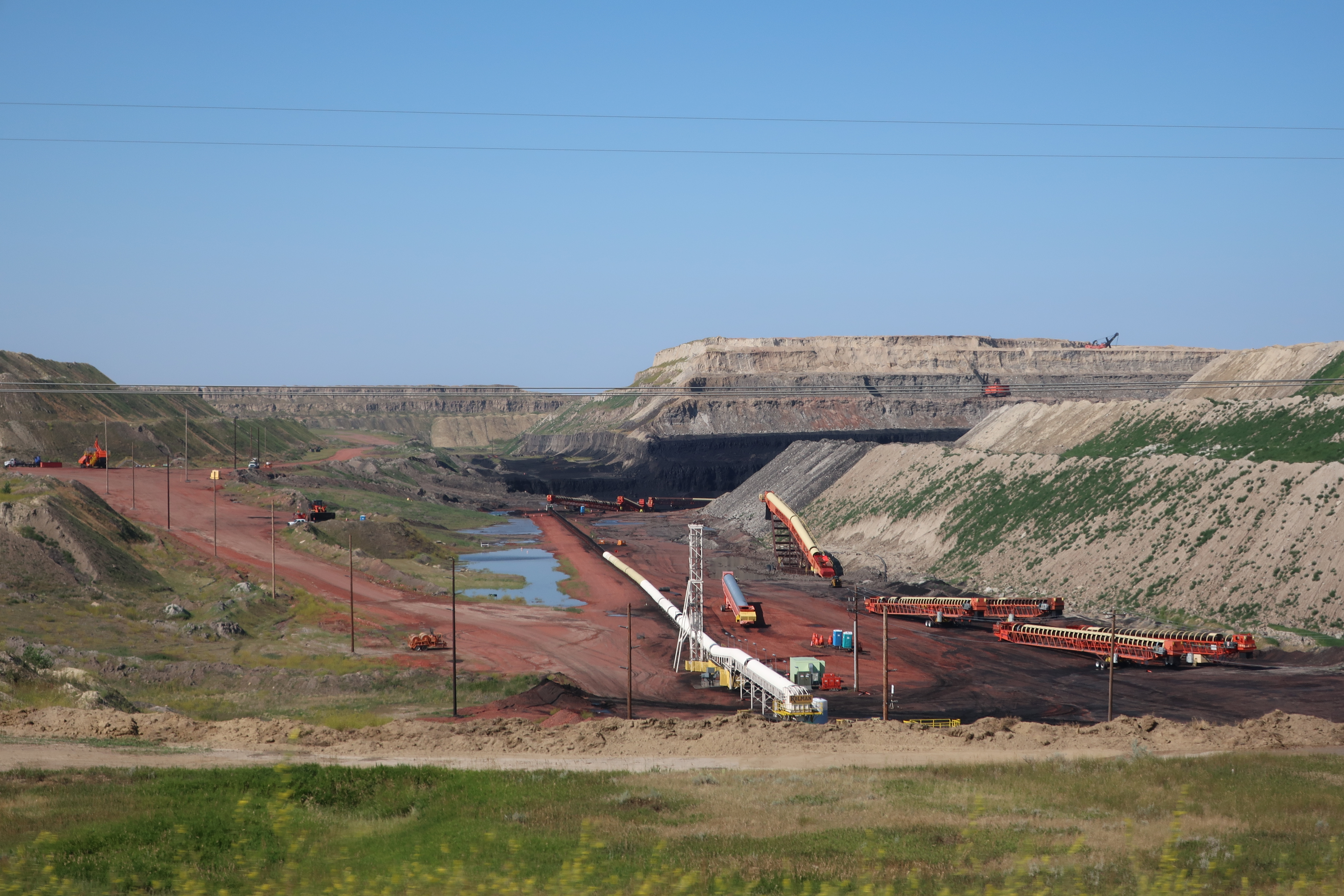
- The Wyodak Mine, as seen from Interstate 90, July 2018

- Location within Wyoming
- Location: Wyoming, United States; 44°18′25″N 105°23′13″W
- Products: Coal
- Opened: 1923
- Company: Black Hills Corporation
- Website: www.blackhillscorp.com
- Acquired: 1956

The Wyodak mine is a coal mine in Wyodak, Wyoming, United States, located about 6 miles (9.7 km) east of Gillette in the coal-rich Powder River Basin.

== Description ==
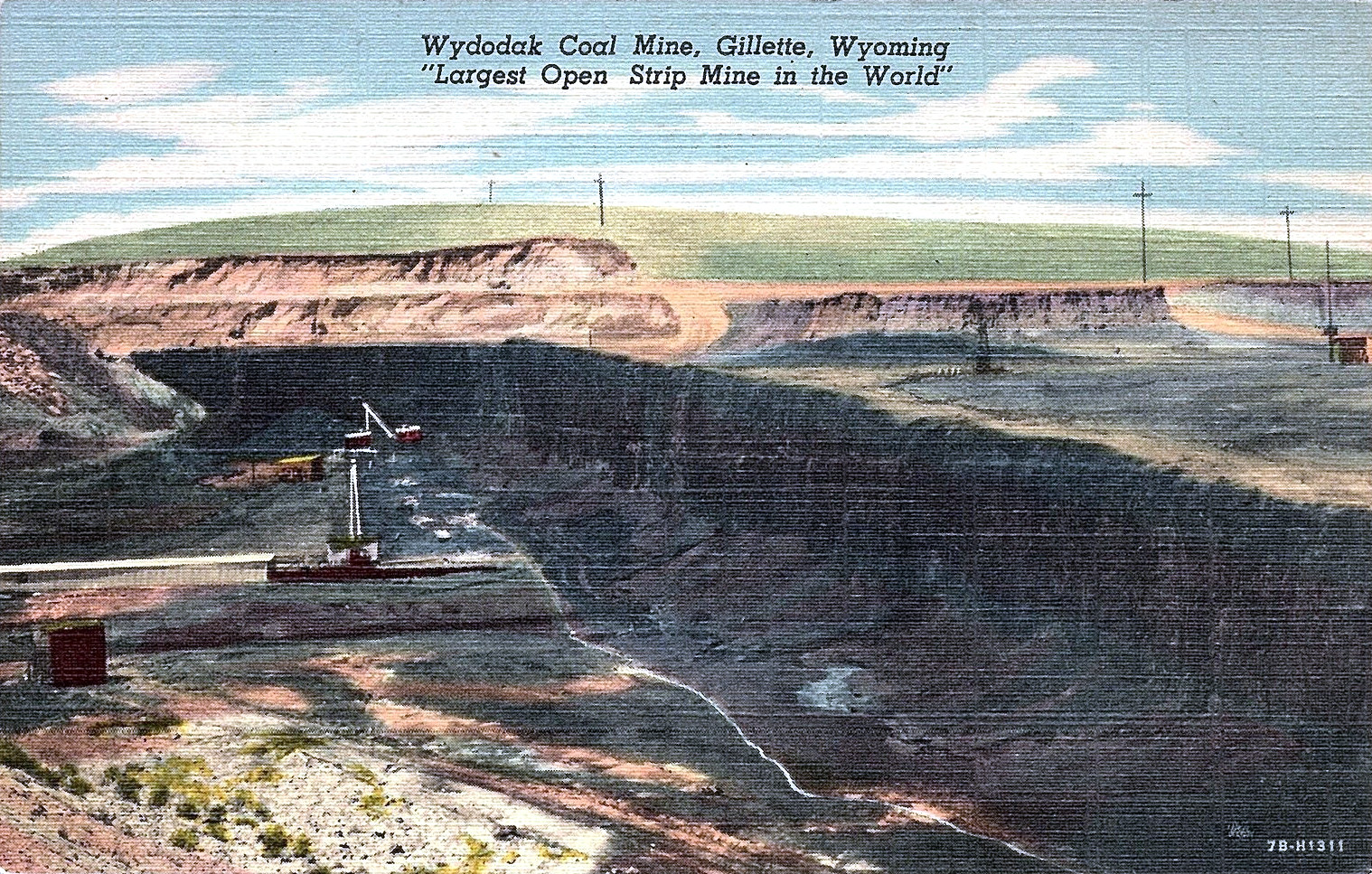
A postcard of the Wyodak Mine, circa 1930-1945

The operation is an open pit mine that utilizes a truck and shovel mining method to produce a low-sulfur, sub-bituminous coal that is used for domestic energy generation. The mine ships its coal to the adjacent Wyodak power plant and to other customers via railroad. The mine is operated by Wyodak Resources Development, a subsidiary of the Black Hills Corporation.

As of 2009, Wyodak had reserves of 294mm tons of sub-bituminous coal and a maximum permitted production capacity of 10mm tons per year. Typical annual production has been in the 5-6mm ton range for the last several years though. In 2008, the mine produced just over 6.0 million short tons of coal, making it the 30th-largest producer of coal in the United States.

The average quality of the coal produced from the Wyodak Mine is 8,050 BTU/lb, 0.40% Sulfur, 6.0% Ash, and 0.94% Sodium (of the ash). Train loading operations at the mine are done by a flood loading system that is coupled to a "weigh-in-motion" track scale system. Silo capacity at the mine's rail loop, which can accommodate a single unit train, is 24,000 tons.

== History ==
Mining operations at the mine site first began around 1918 with the establishment of the Peerless Mine. The Peerless Mine was an underground room and pillar operation that mined coal near the outcrop of the Wyodak seam. Though the operation went out of business in 1925, it left behind underground workings which were uncovered and mined through by the Wyodak mine in the 1950s.

The modern Wyodak mine was established in 1923 to provide coal for power plants that supplied energy to the Homestake Mine (South Dakota) for its mining and milling operations. In 1956, the Black Hills Corporation purchased the mine from the Homestake Mining Company by exercising an option that was negotiated during its purchase of the Wyodak power plant in 1954.

It is believed that Wyodak is the oldest, continually operated surface coal mine in the United States.

== Production ==
Year	Coal Production	Employees
2018	4,085,044	66
2017	4,182,800	63
2016	3,717,414	67
2015	4,140,386	68
2014	4,317,023	66
2013	4,285,445	65
2012	4,245,981	80
2011	5,691,756	120
2010	5,930,614	116
2009	6,016,063	121
2008	6,017,311	116
2007	5,049,232	109
2006	4,698,473	66
2005	4,701,625	68
2004	4,780,104	59
2003	4,812,346	56
2002	4,052,374	55
2001	3,518,162	53
2000	3,050,325	43
1999	3,179,585	43
1998	3,280,157	43
1997	3,250,969	46
1996	3,198,544	47
1995	2,984,000	51
1994	2,795,942	52
1993	3,027,356	57
1992	2,257,551	58
1991	2,741,809	57
1990	2,907,639	63
1989	2,349,135	70
1988	2,709,494	71
1987	2,976,398	76
1986	2,584,856	77
1985	2,898,482	72
1984	2,443,831	69

== See also ==
- List of coal mines in the United States
