= 2019 Harlan County coal miners' protest =

Labor dispute in Kentucky, United States

The 2019 Harlan County coal miners' protest was a labor protest held by dozens of coal miners in Cumberland, Kentucky, United States. The causes of the protest stemmed from the 2019 bankruptcy of Blackjewel Coal, a coal mining company that operated a mine in the county. Following the company's bankruptcy, former coal miners did not receive payment for several weeks of work, leading to many miners protesting by blocking a coal train on tracks in the county. The protest lasted from July 29 to September 26, with litigation continuing in bankruptcy courts.

== Background ==
In 2019, Blackjewel, LLC, a subsidiary of Revelation Energy, was one of the largest coal operators in the country. On July 1, 2019, Blackjewel Coal filed for bankruptcy, leading to the abrupt firing of about 1,700 miners in Kentucky, Virginia, West Virginia, and Wyoming. 200 miners in Harlan County were affected. Following this, many of the affected workers reported bounced paychecks and being unable to access their 401(k) accounts. Shortly thereafter, a miner in Wyoming filed a class-action lawsuit against Blackjewel, arguing that they violated workers' rights under the WARN Act.

On July 5, 2019, Andy Beshear, Attorney General of Kentucky, issued a statement-

"My job is to protect Kentucky families and ensure our workers are treated fairly and with the dignity they deserve. In the last several days, my office has received numerous troubling complaints related to the Blackjewel mining company ranging from clawed back paychecks to child support issues. I have therefore instructed my office to use all of its powers and resources to seek answers for those who have been harmed. No Kentuckian should put in an honest day's work only to have their paycheck taken away and their livelihood disrupted."

On July 8, 2019, Kentucky Governor Matt Bevin announced that the Kentucky Labor Cabinet would begin an investigation regarding Blackjewel's actions. Affected miners were encouraged to reach out to the Cabinet.

On July 16, Beshear, as well as Virginia Attorney General Mark Herring, reached out to enlist the help of the Office of the United States Trustee which was overseeing Blackjewel's bankruptcy case. They asked for "the immediate payment of all wages owed to Blackjewel employees."

On July 25, Beshear met with Judge Executive Dan Mosley, furloughed Blackjewel miners, and their families at the Harlan County Courthouse. Beshear asked the miners to submit detailed information regarding wages owed as well as regular paycheck deductions such as child support and retirement funds.

Blackjewel miners in central Appalachia were owed close to $11.8 million in wages and nearly $1.2 million in retirement benefits. Miners were unable to make house payments, car payments, buy groceries and prescription medications. According to attorneys who later represented the miners, each miner was owed an average of $4,202.91 for earned pay and benefits.

== Organization ==
On Monday, July 29, a local resident living nearby the closed Blackjewel Cloverlick Mine No. 3 in Cumberland noticed some activity at the prep plant. She observed a train being loaded with coal. She alerted a few of the furloughed Blackjewel miners who went to the mine seeking answers from management as to when they would be paid for the coal they had mined. The train continued to move forward as cars were loaded. Five miners (Dalton Lewis, Chris Sexton, Dakota Shepherd, Blake Watts, and Jeff Willig) blocked the coal train by standing on the railroad tracks. The train contained $1.4 million worth of coal that had been sold by Blackjewel.

Kentucky State Police were called to the scene by Blackjewel security guards. Trooper Danny Caudill reported, "We received a call that several individuals came up here and were blocking the tracks and wouldn't allow a train to pass. When I arrived on scene, that number had been grossly overstated. There was not near the number of individuals that was reported. I made contact with the group and they were very understanding when I explained what the law was and they cooperated."

The five miners were escorted off of Blackjewel property by KSP officers. The miners repositioned themselves on a different section of track, approximately a mile from the mine at Sand Hill Bottom. Soon, the miners were joined by dozens of others, forming human chains to block the coal train from leaving the area. The group continued to block the tracks throughout the night. By the next day, supporters supplied food and water and tents were set up on the site.

The protest remained peaceful. Willig stated, "This is what we're trying to do, we're trying to let people know 'hey, we're not here to hurt anybody, cause no trouble. We've been peaceful and we just want our money, that's all we want, we just want the money that we worked for. We're not expecting our jobs back. We're not gonna try and sit here and fool nobody."

== Railroad occupation ==
The next day, miners and their families blocking the railroad tracks were joined by over a hundred protesters including retired UMWA miners, government officials, politicians, religious leaders, and activists. Stanley Sturgill, a local retired miner, stated, "If the trains get out that's more money for the company and nothing for the coal miners and they have shafted these coal miners. It's terrible they left them high and dry. They can't go to doctors, they can't eat — that's why we're trying to help them."

Protesters entertained themselves by playing cornhole and listening to music. Protesters received meals of pizza and sandwiches as well as monetary donations to help with mortgage payments and utility bills. Homemade signs written on everything from old pizza boxes to bed sheets declared the motto of the protest, "No pay, we stay."

On July 31, CSX Transportation requested that protestors allow for the safe passage of two train engines. According to a CSX statement, "Following productive discussions with local stakeholders, the demonstrators agreed to briefly withdraw allowing a CSX crew to safely retrieve two locomotives from the blocked coal train so that we could continue serving other customers. We continue to monitor the situation and are hopeful that a quick resolution can be reached."

On August 2, former Kentucky Attorney General Greg Stumbo visited the protestors, criticizing Blackjewel and the Kentucky Labor Department for failing to hold the company accountable for workers rights violations. On August 3, Governor Bevin surprised the protesters when he arrived to commend the miners and the community for representing themselves "with pride, with class, with dignity and what you're asking for is justice." On August 5, the Richard and Leslie Gilliam Foundation donated $1 million to miners affected by the layoffs in the region. $492,000 was reserved for the Harlan County Community Action Agency (CAA) to aid Blackjewel miners. On August 16, 2020 Democratic Party Presidential candidate Bernie Sanders voiced his support for the protestors and sent pizzas to the protestors. Senate candidate Amy McGrath voiced her support for the protestors, along with Senate Majority Leader Mitch McConnell of Kentucky.

As the blockade continued through September, performers from The STAY Project, Appalachian youth for social change, provided live music. Transgender activists arrived from neighboring counties to help organize the camp and build solidarity by installing a solar powered shower and an outdoor kitchen.

On September 26, the protest ended when the last two participants, Chris and Stacy Rowe, left the site. Rowe found work elsewhere as did some of his fellow protesters. Others returned to school for vocational retraining. Furloughed miners still had not received the wages they were owed although settlement talks were underway with the company and fired workers.

== Aftermath ==
In October, as part of the company's bankruptcy settlement, $5.47 million was awarded to fired miners, including those in Harlan County.

A similar train blockade occurred in January 2020 in Pike County, Kentucky. On January 13, miners for Quest Energy occupied a railroad track near Kemper, Kentucky and blocked a 120-car coal train from leaving, claiming that the company failed to pay them wages for three weeks. The protest ended on January 15, with the protesting miners receiving pay.

== Historical Context ==
While the Blackjewel protest was entirely peaceful, Harlan County has been the site of labor protests for nearly a century. In the 1930s, coal miners attempted to unionize earning the area the nickname "Bloody Harlan." Coal operators used deadly violence as a means to break the strike and miners fought back with equal violence. In the 1970s, violence once again erupted in Harlan County. Miners at the Duke Energy mine engaged in a prolonged strike regarding fringe benefits and working conditions. By the end, miners had endured 90 arrests and 40 acts of violence.

== See also ==
- Harlan County War
- Harlan County, USA
