= Black Hills Corporation =

Energy company

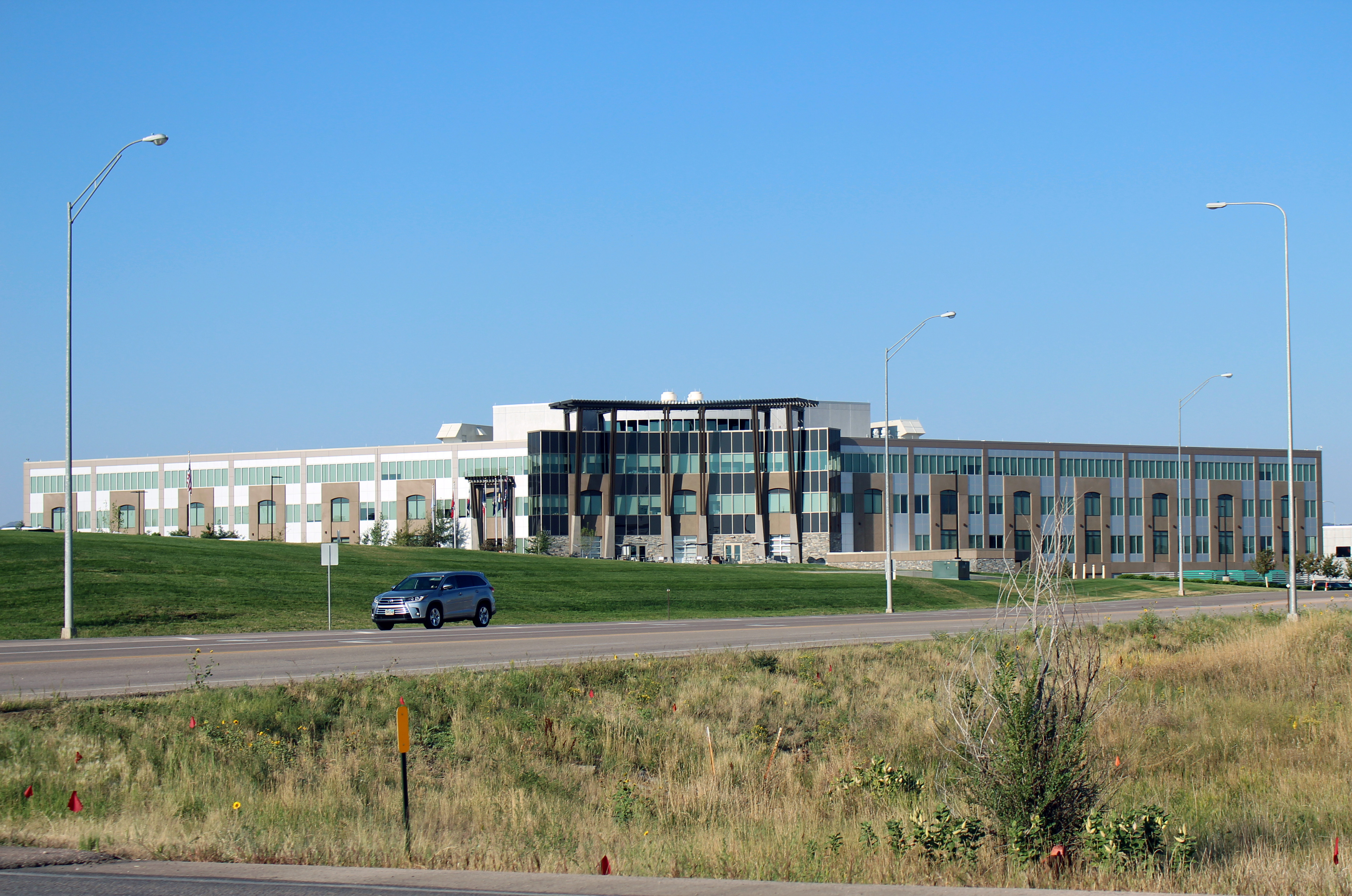
- Black Hills headquarters in Rapid City
- Company type: Public
- Traded as: NYSE: BKH; S&P 400 component
- Genre: Energy Company
- Founded: 1941; 85 years ago
- Founder: J. B. French
- Headquarters: Rapid City, South Dakota, United States
- Key people: Linden Evans (president, CEO)
- Revenue: ▼US$1.696 Billion (Fiscal Year Ended 31 December 2020)
- Operating income: ▲US$428.303 Million (Fiscal Year Ended 31 December 2020)
- Net income: ▲US$242.763 Million (Fiscal Year Ended 31 December 2020)
- Total assets: ▲US$8.088 Billion (Fiscal Year Ended 31 December 2020)
- Total equity: ▲US$2.662 Billion (Fiscal Year Ended 31 December 2020)
- Subsidiaries: Black Hills Power; Cheyenne Light, Fuel & Power; Black Hills Non-Regulated Holdings; Black Hills Electric Parent Holdings; Black Hills Utility Holdings; Black Hills Service Company
- Website: ir.blackhillscorp.com

Black Hills Corporation is an American diversified energy company that is an electric and gas utility in South Dakota, Montana, Wyoming, Colorado, Arkansas, Kansas, Nebraska, and Iowa. The company sells power throughout the American West. The company is based in Rapid City, South Dakota. It derives its name from its home in the Black Hills of South Dakota.

== History ==
The company traces its roots to 1883 and the organization of the Black Hills Electric Light Company of Deadwood. Merged with the Belt Light and Power Company of Lead in 1905, the company became Consolidated Power and Light Company of South Dakota. Meanwhile, to the south, the Dakota Power Company began serving Rapid City in 1910. Both of these companies were purchased by holding companies in the 1920s. With Roosevelt-era legislation to break up big national utility holding companies, Black Hills Power & Light Company was formed in 1941 by combining the assets of General Public Utilities, Inc. and Dakota Power Company which provided power for most of western South Dakota.

In 1956, the company completed its acquisition of the Wyodak Coal Company (now Wyodak Resources Development Corporation), from the Homestake Mining Company, setting the stage for the company's significant investments in mining, oil and gas.

In July 2002, Black Hills Corporation announced that a settlement was reached with the U.S. Commodity Futures Trading Commission (CFTC) relating to its marketing subsidiary, Enserco Energy, Inc. Based in Golden, Colorado, Enserco engages in natural gas marketing on the wholesale market and on behalf of independent producers. On November 25, 2002, Black Hills Corporation announced that its new independent public accountants, Deloitte & Touche LLP, had completed the audit of Black Hills Corporation's 2001, 2000 and 1999 financial statements that were originally audited by Arthur Andersen LLP.

In 2004, Black Hills acquired Cheyenne Light from Xcel Energy. Cheyenne Light continues to operate as a separate subsidiary.

In 2007, it announced an agreement to buy the natural gas utility in Colorado, Kansas, Nebraska and Iowa and its Colorado electric utility from Aquila, Inc. Completed in July 2008, the deal increased the company's customer base from 137,000 to 753,000 and increased its employee base from 916 to 2,000.

In July 2015, Black Hills announced it was purchasing SourceGas for $1.89 billion. The deal covers approximately 425,000 customers in Arkansas, Colorado, Nebraska and Wyoming and a 512-mile regulated intrastate natural gas transmission pipeline in Colorado.

In late 2016, Black Hills announced plans to invest $700 million to build a 1 million square foot drilling and pipe production plant in Norfolk, Nebraska. The facility was expected to employ 400 people. Black Hills said it would use 500,000 tons of steel per year from Nucor Steel.

In March 2018, Black Hills received, and turned down, an unsolicited $1.1 billion purchase offer from the San Isabel Electric Association in Colorado; it responded to the offer with a full-page newspaper ad in the Pueblo Chieftain.

In August 2025, Black Hills and NorthWestern Energy agreed to a merger in an all-stock deal valuing the combined entity at $15.4 billion. On completion, Black Hills shareholders will own about 54% of the combined company and will be run by NorthWestern's CEO, Brian Bird.

== Pueblo, Colorado pushback ==
Since 2008, Black Hills Energy's operation in Pueblo has been challenged by various constituencies on numerous policies, most notably the four rate hikes between 2010 and 2018, in some cases amounting to 50% rate increases. Voters in 2010 approved a 20-year franchise agreement with the company.

Describing the company's vision for the future, Julie Rodriguez, program manager for community affairs and economic development for Black Hills Energy's Colorado electric operations, said, "Our primary goals are to identify an energy resource that is cost effective for our customers, while also generating sufficient renewable energy to comply with the Colorado… requirements." To achieve its goals, in June 2017, the company issued a request for proposals for up to 60 megawatts of renewable energy, including wind energy and other sources, along with those that are greenhouse gas-neutral or recycled energy. The Colorado Public Utilities Commission approved the request as part of the company's 2016 Electric Resource Plan and 2018-2021 Renewable Energy Standard Compliance Plan.

As of June 2017, Black Hills Energy in Colorado obtains 19 percent of its electricity from renewable resources, with the rest coming from natural gas. In attempts to meet customer demand and requirements set by the state, Black Hills Energy has established new natural gas facilities, wind farms, and solar energy systems. By 2020, in order to comply with Colorado state laws, the company must generate at least 30 percent of its electricity from renewable resources. Rodriguez, asserting her company's dedication to meeting this goal, said, "Developing renewable energy at a reasonable cost is important to the communities we serve and allows us to continue providing customers with the safe, reliable energy they've come to expect."

In August 2018, Pueblo city council unanimously voted to spend $122,000 on a consulting firm, selected by the Electric Utility Commission from eight proposals, to explore its options to prematurely exit the Black Hills franchise agreement by 2020, perhaps forming its own municipal energy operation. While study results are due in nine months, a draft could be delivered in November, and a final study as early as January.

== Components ==
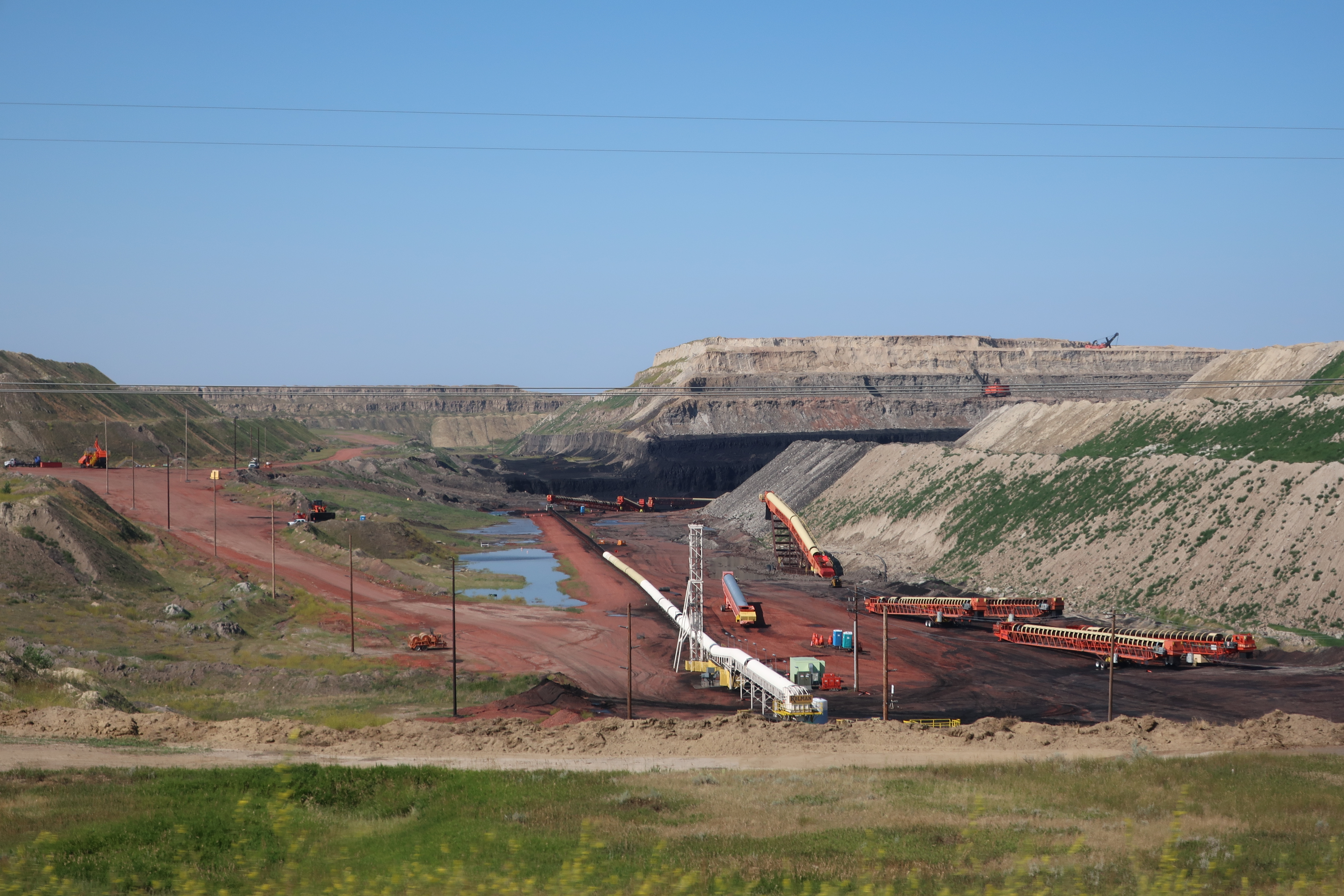
Wyodak Mine east of Gillette, Wyoming

As of June 2026, the top-level, wholly owned subsidiaries of Black Hills Corp. are: Black Hills Power; Cheyenne Light, Fuel & Power; Black Hills Non-Regulated Holdings; Black Hills Electric Parent Holdings; Black Hills Utility Holdings; and Black Hills Service Company. Most of these subsidiaries (and their subsidiaries' subsidiaries) do business under the common name of Black Hills Energy.

The company is the electric utility for 64,200 customers between Rapid City, South Dakota and Newcastle, Wyoming as well as southeastern Montana via its Black Hills Power subsidiary. Its Cheyenne Light, Fuel & Power Company subsidiary serves another 80,000 in Cheyenne, Wyoming and southeastern Wyoming. Via its Black Hills Energy component it has 1,000 Megawatts of generating capacity in Colorado, Nevada, Wyoming and California including two plants serving Las Vegas, Nevada. The company's bigger component is its wholesale energy wing.

The centerpiece of the operation is the Wyodak Mine near Gillette, Wyoming in the Powder River Basin, which is the oldest operating surface mine for coal in the United States. The mine has permitted reserves of 286 million tons. In addition it claims 169 billion cubic feet (4.8×10^{9} m^{3}) in oil and gas reserves (76% of which is natural gas) principally in New Mexico, Colorado and Wyoming.

== See also ==
- List of S&P 400 companies
