= Blackjewel =

American energy company

Blackjewel LLC is an American energy company which held a significant portion of the coal mines in the United States. The company became of national importance after its 2019 bankruptcy filling and liquidation. In 2021, a federal bankruptcy judge ruled that the company was allowed to abandon assets without cleaning up the environmental damage of mines in its holdings. These holdings included mountaintop removal, surface mines and coal refuse many of which had significant potential environmental and public health impacts. For example, of 187 mining permits in Kentucky, 150 had 587 outstanding environmental violations, many of which did not have a bond to pay for cleanup.

In part the large environmental legacy of the company was caused by the practice of former CEO Jeff Hoops in buying coal assets from companies that were not finding them economically viable. Many of these were acquired from bankruptcies in 2014/2015. At the time of the 2019 filing, the company had 1700 employees in Wyoming, Virginia, West Virginia and Kentucky coal countries. These employees were left without any financial relief at their termination, spawning protests in Cumberland, Kentucky and Harlan County.

== Protests ==
The 2019 Harlan County coal miners' protest was a labor protest held by dozens of coal miners in Cumberland, Kentucky. The causes of the protest stemmed from the 2019 bankruptcy of Blackjewel Coal, a coal mining company that operated a mine in the county. Following the company's bankruptcy, former coal miners did not receive payment for several weeks of work, leading to many miners protesting by blocking a coal train on tracks in the county. The protest lasted from July 29 to September 26, with litigation continuing in bankruptcy courts.

== Mines ==
Mines controlled by Blackjewel included:

- Eagle Butte mine Wyoming
- Belle Ayr Mine, Wyoming
