= Eagle Materials =

American producer of materials

Eagle Materials Inc.
- Type: Public company
- Traded as: NYSE: EXP; S&P 400 component
- Industry: Building materials
- Founded: 1963; 63 years ago
- Headquarters: Dallas, Texas,
- Key people: David B. Powers, President & CEO; D. Craig Kesler, CFO
- Products: Cement; Concrete; Construction aggregate Gypsum; Wallboard; Paperboard; Sand for hydraulic fracturing
- Revenue: ▲$2.1 billion (2023)
- Net income: ▲$461.5 million (2023)
- Total assets: ▲$2.781 billion (2023)
- Total equity: ▲$1.185 billion (2023)
- Number of employees: 2,400 (2023)
- Website: www.eaglematerials.com

Eagle Materials Inc. is an American producer of building materials based in Dallas, Texas. The company produces cement, concrete, construction aggregate, gypsum, wallboard, paperboard, and sand for hydraulic fracturing.

As of 2023, the company operates 7 cement plants, 1 slag grinding facility, 17 cement distribution terminals, five gypsum wallboard plants, 3 frac sand wet processing facilities, 3 frac sand drying facilities, and 6 frac sand trans-load locations.

== History ==
The company was founded in 1963 as a division of Centex Construction Company. Between April 1994 and January 30, 2004, the company was known as Centex Construction Products, Inc.

On January 30, 2004, Centex distributed its shares in the company to its shareholders and the company was renamed Eagle Materials Inc.

In May 2005, the company announced a $65 million expansion of its plant in LaSalle, Illinois.

In September 2012, the company acquired plants in Sugar Creek, Missouri and Tulsa, Oklahoma from Lafarge for $446 million.

In October 2014, the company acquired CRS Proppants LLC, a frac sand supplier, for $225 million.

In February 2017, the company acquired a cement plant in Fairborn, Ohio from Cemex for $400 million.

In May 2024, the company began expanding its cement plant in Laramie, Wyoming.
