= Alpha Metallurgical Resources =

American coal supplier

Alpha Metallurgical Resources, Inc.
- Formerly: Contura Energy, LLC.
- Type: Public company
- Traded as: NYSE: AMR; S&P 600 component
- Industry: Metals and mining
- Predecessor: Alpha Natural Resources
- Founded: July 26, 2016
- Headquarters: Bristol, Tennessee, U.S.
- Key people: Andy Eidson (CEO, Chairman)
- Products: Coking and steam coal
- Number of employees: 3,960
- Divisions: Dominion Terminal Associates (41%); Alpha Holdings; ANR Inc.
- Website: alphametresources.com

Alpha Metallurgical Resources, formerly Contura Energy (January 2021), is a leading coal supplier with underground and surface coal mining complexes across Northern and Central Appalachia. Contura owns large coal basins in Pennsylvania, Virginia and West Virginia which supply both metallurgical coal to produce steel and thermal coal to generate power.

The volatile nature of the coal mining sector in the US bankrupted predecessor Alpha Natural Resources in 2015, seven years removed from Alpha's $7.1 billion takeover of Massey Energy. The majority of its workers are non-unionized.

In 2011 Alpha was America's third largest and world's fifth largest coal producer. In the 2012 Forbes Global 2000, Alpha Natural Resources was ranked as the 1847th -largest public company in the world.

== History ==
=== Contura Energy ===
Contura Energy began operations on July 26, 2016, through the purchase of Alpha assets by a consortium lenders. It held nine underground and four surface mines in Virginia, West Virginia, Pennsylvania and Wyoming's Powder River Basin. 1.4 billion tons of reserves, 80% thermal coal.

=== Alpha Natural Resources emergence from bankruptcy ===
In November 2018, Contura merged with Alpha Natural Resources to become America's biggest supplier of metallurgical coal. Even though the combination let Alpha Natural Resources emerge from bankruptcy, the first year was a difficult one; lower coal prices, and higher production costs at mines where it makes the type of coal burned at power plants. The company's valuation fell nearly 90% from the time of the merger until the end of 2019. Even before the COVID-19 crisis broke, on February 10, 2020, reported lower revenues, lower shipment guidance, and much lower margins for met coal (70% of revenue).

Alpha reorganized under federal Chapter 11 bankruptcy in July 2017 by splitting into private firms after selling off many assets. Collectively, they produced a combined 50-60 million tons of coal in 2017 — much less than the once publicly traded firm produced (over 5 billion).

ANR CEO Stetson stated that the takeover offer by Contura gave Alpha international market expertise, access to Virginia ports, and improved financial liquidity.

=== 2011, Massey Energy acquisition ===
On January 31, 2011, Alpha Natural Resources acquired coal producer Massey Energy for US$7.1 billion, completed in June 2011, creating the second biggest coal miner by market capitalization. The merged company (54% owned by Alpha Natural Resources) would be the leading producer of metallurgical coal in the US and have the second largest reserves of coal (5.1 billion tons). Merging operations with Massey is estimated to reduce combined operating costs by $150 million. 7,000 of the 14,000 employees are in West Virginia. In 2010, demand for thermal coal rose while metallurgical coal demand was flat; it made up only 14% of coal sales, down from 17% in 2009.

Massey Energy had become a takeover target after suffering large income losses and negative publicity following an explosion at West Virginia's Upper Big Branch mine that killed 29 employees. Direct costs related to the incident amounted to $128.9 million. Federal regulators and the Mine Safety and Health Administration blamed the explosion on Massey's poor practices; however, the company contested the findings, citing a methane leak.
