= Belle Ayr Mine =

Open pit coal mine near Gillette, Wyoming

Belle Ayr
- Location in Wyoming

Location
- Location: Wyoming, United States; 44°06′09″N 105°25′07″W

Production
- Products: Coal
- Production: 14,257,882 short tons
- Financial year: 2022

History
- Opened: 1972

Owner
- Company: Eagle Specialty Materials LLC
- Website: https://pemining.com/belle-ayr
- Acquired: 2019

The Belle Ayr mine is a coal mine located 18 miles southeast of Gillette, Wyoming in the United States in the coal-rich Powder River Basin. The mine is an open pit, "truck and shovel", mine producing a low-sulfur, sub-bituminous coal from the Wyodak-Anderson seam that is used for domestic energy generation. Coal produced by the mine is shipped to its customers via railroad. The mine is owned and operated by Eagle Specialty Materials LLC after being acquired from Blackjewel LLC in 2019.

As of 2009, Belle Ayr had reserves of 406 mm tons of sub-bituminous coal and a maximum permitted production capacity of 45mm tons per year. Typical annual production has been in 26-28mm ton range for the last several years though. The average quality of the coal shipped from Belle Ayr is 8,550 BTU/lb, 0.33% Sulfur, 4.50% Ash, and 1.90% Sodium (of the ash). Train loading operations at the mine are done with a batch weigh bin system that is coupled to a "weigh-in-motion" track scale system. Silo capacity at the mine's rail loop, which can accommodate up to 5 unit trains, is 46,000 tons. In 2008, the mine produced just over 28.7 million short tons of coal, making it the 7th-most productive coal mine in the United States. In 2022, this had halved to just over 14.2 million short tons. However, this still made it the 6th-most productive coal mine in the US that year.

== History ==
The Belle Ayr Mine began operations in 1972 and is the oldest, non-captive mine in the Powder River Basin. Since mining operations began, the mine has shipped over 574 million tons of coal to its customers. The Belle Ayr mine has changed hands many times through mergers and sales. Previous owners include AMAX, Cyprus AMAX, RAG, and Foundation Coal.

In 2007, Belle Ayr was awarded a Director's Award from the Office of Surface Mining for its restoration work on Caballo Creek, which winds its way through the Belle Ayr Mine property.

On July 1, 2019, CEO Jeffery Hoop announced that Blackjewel LLC, the operator of Belle Ayr had filed for bankruptcy and closed the mine. According to the Casper Star-Tribune, court documents show that Blackjewel owes $500 million in liabilities, including $6 million to employees. This was after Blackjewel was denied $20 million in financing by the United Bank of West Virginia.

== Production ==
Year	Coal Production (short tons)	Employees
2022	14,257,882	255
2021	14,449,608	256
2020	11,174,953	252
2019	10,219,206	207
2018	18,467,405	252
2017	15,826,344	244
2016	14,883,227	241
2015	18,318,629	286
2014	15,796,556	263
2013	18,258,922	301
2012	24,227,846	350
2011	24,582,007	351
2010	25,766,025	353
2009	28,655,953	352
2008	28,707,982	328
2007	26,608,765	280
2006	24,593,035	256
2005	19,469,814	259
2004	18,688,358	259
2003	17,853,928	260
2002	17,452,455	235
2001	11,750,497	219
2000	11,750,497	249
1999	15,016,000	253
1998	17,885,338	280
1997	22,800,736	280
1996	19,970,300	261
1995	18,771,977	224
1994	18,361,866	239
1993	15,585,828	230
1992	13,007,761	233
1991	14,748,327	240
1990	15,524,782	241
1989	13,662,836	244
1988	13,295,487	275
1987	13,329,591	347
1986	12,145,894	361
1985	12,829,379	371
1984	13,379,844	381
1983	13,825,242	404
1982	14,800,000	
1981	15,100,000	
1980	15,900,000	
1979	15,000,000	
1978	17,800,000	
1977	13,100,000	
1976	7,100,000	
1975	2,500,000	
1974	2,700,000	
1973	400,000	
1972	100,000	
